= List of Cambrian arthropods =

This list contains many extinct arthropod genera from the Cambrian Period of the Paleozoic Era. Some trilobites, bradoriids and phosphatocopines may not be included due to the lack of literature on these clades and inaccessibility of many papers describing their genera. This list also provides references for any Wikipedia users who intend to create pages for more obscure taxa.

== Miscellaneous Dinocaridida ==
Genus	Year of discovery	Location of fossils
Anomalocaris	1892	Emu Bay Shale; Maotianshan Shales; Burgess Shale; Pioche Shale; Eager Formation; Kinzers Formation
Cucumericrus	1995	Maotianshan Shales
Paranomalocaris	2013	Wulongqing Formation
Ramskoeldia	2018	Maotianshan Shales
Cambroraster	2019	Burgess Shale; Maotianshan Shales
Hurdia	1912	Burgess Shale; Spence Shale; Pioche Shale; Jince Formation; Qingjiang biota? Shujingtuo Formation?
Peytoia	1911	Burgess Shale; Zawiszyn Formation
Ursulinacaris	2019	Mount Cap Formation; Carrara Formation; Kaili Formation
Titanokorys	2018	Burgess Shale
Cordaticaris	2020	Zhangxia Formation
Pahvantia	1981	Wheeler Shale; Marjum Formation
Amplectobelua	1995	Maotianshan Shales; Burgess Shale; Kinzers Formation
Houcaris	2021	Maotianshan Shales; Pioche Shale; Pyramid Shale
Lyrarapax	2014	Maotianshan Shales
Caryosyntrips	2010	Burgess Shale; Wheeler Shale; Marjum Formation; Valdemiedes Formation; Xiaoshiba Biota; Spence Shale
Tamisiocaris	2010	Sirius Passet; Kinzers Formation
Opabinia	1912	Burgess Shale
Utaurora	2022	Wheeler Formation
Kerygmachela	1993	Sirius Passet
Laminacaris	2018	Maotianshan Shales; Kinzers Formation?
Pambdelurion	1997	Sirius Passet
Mobulavermis	2023	Pioche Shale
Echidnacaris	2023	Emu Bay Shale; Kinzers Formation
Utahnax	2022	Wheeler Shale?
Buccaspinea	2021	Marjum Formation
Guanshancaris	2023	Guanshan biota
Omnidens	2006	Maotianshan Shales; Xiaoshiba Lagerstatte
Innovatiocaris	2022	Maotianshan Shales
Shucaris	2024	Maotianshan Shales
Stanleycaris	2018	Burgess Shale; Qingjiang biota
Lenisicaris	2021	Maotianshan Shales; Kinzers Formation
Youti	2024	Maotianshan Shales
Siberion	2011	Sinsk Formation
Jianshanopodia	2006	Maotianshan Shales
Megadictyon	1999	Maotianshan Shales
Parvibellus (dubious)	2022	Maotianshan Shales
Hadranax	1998	Sirius Passet
Mosura	2025	Burgess Shale

== Miscellaneous Deuteropoda ==
Genus	Year of discovery	Location of fossils
Liangshanella	1997	Maotianshan Shales; Burgess Shale
Kunmingella	1912	Maotianshan Shales
Comptaluta	1968	Maotianshan Shales
Jiucunella	1991	Maotianshan Shales; Wirrapowie Limestone
Kunyangella	1965	Maotianshan Shales
Acutobalteus	2017	South Australia
Alutella	1951	Scania; Sirius Passet
Albrunnicola	1979	Borgholm Formation; Bastion Formation; Wirrapowie Limestone
Amphikeropsis	2007	South Australia
Anabarochilina	1960	Weeks Formation; Marjum Formation; Monastery Creek Phosphorite; Mancetter Shale Formation
Beyrichona	1886	Hanford Brook Formation; Maclean Brook Formation
Annge	2014	Giles Creek Dolostone
Aluta	1896	Niutitang Formation; Chamberlains Brook Formation
Bradoria	1899	Dugald Formation; Hanford Brook Formation
Cambria	1956	Pardailhan Formation
Cordubiella	2008	Pedroche Formation
Dictyocharion	2009	Thorntonia Limestone
Emeiella	1975	Jince Formation
Escasona	1902	Dugald Formation
Eozhexiella	2017	South Australia
Euzepaera	1990	Wirrapowie Limestone
Flumenoglacies	2015	Stephen Formation; Ekspedition Brae Formation
Haoia	1990	Mernmerna Formation
Hipponicharion	1886	Hanford Brook Formation
Indiana	1902	Comley Limestone; Bright Angel Shale; Hanford Brook Formation; Dugald Formation; Kinzers Formation?
Indianites	1931	Saint-Jean-de-la-Riviere Formation
Indota	1968	Murray Shale
Jinxinlingella	1975	Wirrapowie Limestone
Konicekion	1975	Jince Formation
Manawarra	2017	South Australia
Matthoria	1997	Pardailhan Formation
Monceretia	2005	Pardailhan Formation
Mononotella	1931	Hanford Brook Formation
Navarana	2017	Henson Gletscher Formation
Neokunmingella	1974	Wirrapowie Limestone
Parahoulongdongella	1990	Wirrapowie Limestone
Petrianna	1975	Buen Formation
Pseudobeyrichona	1990	Tannenknock Formation
Quadricona	2011	Wirrapowie Limestone
Sanlangella	2008	Yanwangbian Formation
Sinskolutella	1998	Sinsk Formation
Spinospitella	2006	Mernmerna Formation
Tscholponaella	1997	Beshtash Formation
Uskutchiella	1997	Tandoshka Formation
Walcottella	1931	Bright Angel Shale; Riley Formation?
Wimanicharion	1993	Valdemiedes Formation
Zepaera	1973	Ajax Limestone
Cambroarchilocus	2020	Puerto Blanco Formation
Fuxianhuia	1987	Maotianshan Shales
Alacaris	2018	Xiaoshiba Lagerstatte
Chengjiangocaris	1991	Maotianshan Shales
Guangweicaris	2007	Guanshan biota
Isoxys	1890	Burgess Shale; Maotianshan Shales; Sirius Passet; Balang Formation; Spence Shale; Sinsk Formation; Emu Bay Shale; Shujintuo Formation; Rockslide Formation; Kaili Biota; Mantou Formation; Pedrouche Formation
Surusicaris	2015	Burgess Shale
Kylinxia	2020	Maotianshan Shales
Erratus	2022	Maotianshan Shales
Fengzhengia	2022	Maotianshan Shales
Xiaocaris	2020	Maotianshan Shales
Shankouia	2005	Maotianshan Shales
Liangwangshania	2005	Maotianshan Shales
Oura	2025	Maotianshan Shales

== Chelicerata ==
Genus	Year of discovery	Locations of fossils
Sanctacaris	1988	Burgess Shale
Habelia	1912	Burgess Shale; Duchesnay Formation?
Mollisonia	1912	Maotianshan Shales; Burgess Shale; Langston Formation; Wheeler Shale
Thelxiope	1975	Burgess Shale; Wheeler Shale; Fezouata Formation; Linyi Lagerstätte
Cambropycnogon	2002	Orsten Fauna
Wisangocaris	2016	Emu Bay Shale
Utahcaris	1988	Spence Shale
Actaeus	1970	Burgess Shale
Alalcomenaeus	1970	Burgess Shale; Chengjiang Biota; Wheeler Shale
Leanchoilia	1912	Burgess Shale; Chengjiang Biota; Spence Shale
Fortiforceps	1997	Maotianshan Shales
Yawunik	2015	Burgess Shale
Parapeytoia	1995	Maotianshan Shales
Jianfengia	1987	Maotianshan Shales
Haikoucaris	2004	Maotianshan Shales
Kanoshoia	2020	Wheeler Formation
Sklerolibyon	2020	Maotianshan Shales
Tanglangia	1999	Maotianshan Shales; Emu Bay Shale
Oestokerkus	2011	Emu Bay Shale
Yohoia	1912	Burgess Shale

== Mandibulata ==
Genus	Year of discovery	Locations of fossils
Branchiocaris	1929	Wheeler Shale; Burgess Shale
Tokummia	2017	Burgess Shale
Canadaspis	1960	Burgess Shale; Pioche Shale; Maotianshan Shales; Duchesnay Formation?
Waptia	1912	Burgess Shale
Pectocaris	1999	Maotianshan Shales; Xiaoshiba Biota
Clypecaris	1999	Maotianshan Shales
Pauloterminus	2002	Sirius Passet
Perspicaris	1977	Burgess Shale; Rockslide Formation?
Nereocaris	2012	Burgess Shale
Plenocaris	1974	Burgess Shale; Maotianshan Shales
Fibulacaris	2019	Burgess Shale
Synophalos	2009	Maotianshan Shales
Odaraia	1912	Burgess Shale
Protocaris	1884	Parker Slate
Hymenocaris	1853	Burgess Shale
Loricicaris	2014	Burgess Shale
Jugatacaris	2011	Maotianshan Shales
Erjiecaris	2014	Maotianshan Shales
Balhuticaris	2022	Burgess Shale
Xiazhuangocaris	2021	Maotianshan Shales
Vermontcaris	2022	Parker Slate
Pseudoarctolepis	1956	Wheeler Shale
Pakucaris	2021	Burgess Shale
Duplapex	2021	Qingjiang biota
Tuzoia	1912	Burgess Shale; Emu Bay Shale; Kaili Biota; Spence Shale; Wheeler Formation; Marjum Formation; Kinzers Formation; Sinsk Formation; Parker Slate; Wulongqing Formation; Tangshih Formation; Eager Formation; Tsinghsutung Formation; Balang Formation
Wujicaris	2010	Maotianshan Shales
Ercaia	2001	Maotianshan Shales
Mosineia	2010	Blackberry Hill
Cambrocaris	1991	Orsten
Bredocaris	1983	Orsten
Heymonsicambria	1994	Orsten
Skara	1983	Orsten
Dala	1983	Orsten
Cambropachycope	1990	Orsten
Goticaris	1990	Orsten
Sandtorpia	2009	Orsten
Walossekia	1983	Orsten
Rehbachiella	1983	Orsten
Martinssonia	1986	Orsten
Musacaris	2010	Orsten
Henningsmoenicaris	1990	Orsten
Oelandocaris	1983	Orsten
Aengapentastomum	2005	Orsten
Boeckelericambria	1994	Orsten
Haffnericambria	1994	Orsten
Paulinecaris	2014	Orsten
Klausmuelleria	2003	Comley Limestone
Mictomerus	2010	Potsdam Group
Apankura	2004	Santa Rosita Formation
Arenosicaris	2010	Blackberry Hill
Dietericambria	2022	Henson Gletscher Formation
Ercaicunia	1999	Maotianshan Shales
Yicaris	2007	Maotianshan Shales
Hesslandona	1964	Orsten; Bitiao Formation; Strenuella Limestone
Cyclotron	1969	Whiteleaved Oak Shale; Słowińska Formation
Trapezilites	1993	Alum Shale
Waldoria	1981	Orsten
Falites	1964	Orsten

== Artiopoda ==
=== Trilobita ===
Genus	Year of Discovery	Location of Fossils
Fritzaspis	2007	Campito Formation
Bathyuriscus	1873	Burgess Shale; Lead Bell Shale; Pioche Shale; Spence Shale; Gordon Shale; Kinzers Formation; Wolsey Formation; Cadiz Formation; El Gavilán Formation; Blacksmith Formation; Shallow Bay Formation; Kap Stanton Formation; Wheeler Shale; Marjum Formation; Hillard Limestone; Hess River Formation; Henson Gletscher Formation; Meagher Formation; Parker Slate; Duchesnay Formation; Aktas Formation; El Mogallón Formation
Gigoutella	1953	Tatelt Formation
Skehanos	2002	Braintree Slate Asbill Pond Formation
Olenoides	1877	Burgess Shale Marjum Formation Usa Formation Shady Formation Lead Bell Shale Schodack Formation Harkless Formation Kaili Formation Spence Shale Pioche Shale Kinzers Formation Swasey Limestone Wheeler Shale Shallow Bay Formation Athei Formation Pleasant Hill Limestone Kap Stanton Formation Pulgon Formation Chibit Formation Henson Gletscher Formation Duchesnay Formation Aktas Formation Marjum Formation Chingiz Formation Holm Dal Formation Vermilion Formation Mount Spann Formation Mount Simon Sandstone
Hanburia	1916	Burgess Shale Stephen Formation
Xiuqiella	1974	Yingzuiyan Formation
Chengkouaspis	1980	Yingzuiyan Formation
Acontheus	1851	Menevia Formation Spurs Formation
Hemirhodon	1937	Marjum Formation Hillard Limestone Duchesnay Formation Holm Dal Formation Skeels Corner Slate Grosses-Roches Formation Vermilion Formation
Thoracocare	1974	Spence Shale Formation
Abakania	1973	Sanashtykgol Formation Usa Formation
Zacanthoides	1888	Burgess Shale Alojamiento Formation Stissing Formation Cadiz Formation Carrara Formation Swasey Limestone Trailer Formation Lead Bell Shale Spence Shale Pioche Shale Pole Canyon Formation Cathedral Formation Arrojos Formation Blacksmith Formation Shallow Bay Formation Wheeler Shale Lakeview Formation Parker Slate Henson Gletscher Formation Hess River Formation Emigrant Formation Marjum Formation Ute Formation
Changaspis	1961	Fengjia'ao Formation Dachenling Formation Balang Formation Tsinghsutung Formation Aoxi Formation
Protopeltura	1882	Alum Shale Wiśniówka Formation Ogon'or Formation Kistedal Formation Lampazar Formation Klonowka Shale Kurchavinskaya Formation Rupasca Formation Santa Rosita Formation
Ogygopsis	1889	Burgess Shale Harkless Formation Lead Bell Shale Henson Gletscher Formation Carrara Formation Pioche Shale Kinzers Formation Spence Shale Swasey Limestone Mount Whyte Formation Shallow Bay Formation Aktas Formation Spurs Formation El Mogallón Formation
Oryctocephalus	1886	Burgess Shale Sekwi Formation Kaili Formation El Gavilán Formation Monola Formation Kinzers Formation Carrara Formation Emigrant Formation Pioche Shale Spence Shale Kuonamka Formation Hess River Formation Sandover Formation
Chancia	1924	Burgess Shale Kinzers Formation Carrara Formation Lead Bell Shale Mount Whyte Formation Parker Slate Wheeler Shale Emigrant Formation
Ehmaniella	1951	Burgess Shale Alojamiento Formation Kaili Formation Spence Shale Lead Bell Shale Pole Canyon Formation Pioche Shale El Gavilán Formation Telt Bugt Formation Ute Limestone Canada Head Formation Bonanza King Formation Aktas Formation March Point Formation Wheeler Shale Jialao Formation
Elrathia	1924	Wheeler Shale Burgess Shale Lead Bell Shale Ognensk Formation Kuonamka Formation Shallow Bay Formation Pleasant Hill Limestone Hillard Limestone Rennie Shale Lakeview Formation Canada Head Formation Henson Gletscher Formation Bloomington Formation Comley Sandstone Kunzam La Formation Duchesnay Formation Marjum Formation Holm Dal Formation Conasauga Formation March Point Formation St Albans Shale Bright Angel Formation
Ellipsocephalus	1823	Słowiec Sandstone Formation Jince Formation
Phantaspis	2020	Mantou Formation
Lisania	1911	Changshia Formation Kunzam La Formation Huaqiao Formation Baguamiao Formation Paotaishan Formation Zhumabai Formation Aktas Formation
Bailiaspis	1936	Whitesands Bay Formation Jbel Lmgaysmat Formation Manuels River Formation Maentwrog Formation Mansilla Formation
Solenoparia	1935	Warburton Basin Fengjia'ao Formation Gaotai Formation Hsuchuang Formation Laoyingshan Formation Zhangxia Formation Maochuang Formation Mantou Formation Changshia Formation Samposan Formation Parahio Formation Xijiadian Formation Aktas Formation
Westergaardites	1937	Huaqiao Formation Hales Limestone Bestogai Formation
Yunnanocephalus	1936	Maotianshan Shales
Asaphiscus	1873	Wheeler Shale
Olenus	1827	Alum Shale
Quitacetra	1967	Quita Creek
Ejinaspis	1986	
Asthenopsis	1939	Christmas Hills, Tasmania
Agraulos	1847	Menevia Formation Jince Formation Manuels River Formation
Coosella	1936	Bonneterre Dolomite
Norwoodia	1916	Weeks Formation
Tricrepicephalus	1935	Chefu Formation Deadwood Formation Little Elk Creek Bonneterre Dolomite Warrior Formation
Meniscopsia	2011	Weeks Formation
Acrocephalella	1963	
Cambroproteus	2015	Jbel Wawrmast Formation
Cedaria	1924	Weeks Formation
Conocoryphe	1847	
Galeaspis	1983	
Genevievella	1936	Mungerbar Formation
Meteoraspis	1935	Limestone Formation Deadwood Formation
Validaspis	1977	
Palaeolenus	1912	Wulongqing Formation
Ptychoparia	1847	
Kootenia	1954	Burgess Shale Emu Bay Shale
Estaingia	1964	Emu Bay Shale
Bathynotus	1860	Parker Quarry Pioche Shale
Bajanaspis	1978	Edreisk Formation
Kleptothule	1995	Sirius Passet
Acadoparadoxides	1957	Słowiec Sandstone Usarzów Sandstone Tannenknock Formation Jince Formation
Paradoxides	1822	Duda Formation
Eoredlichia	1950	Maotianshan Shales
Profallotaspis	1965	Tyusser Formation Pestrotsvet Formation
Lochmanolenellus	1998	Poleta Formation Puerto Blanco Formation
Fritzolenellus	1998	Mural Formation
Olenellus	1861	Pioche Shale Carrara Formation Kinzers Formation
Archaeaspis	1965	Campito Formation
Parapaokannia	1980	
Plutonides	1985	Purley Shale Formation
Redlichia	1902	Emu Bay Shale
Repinaella	1965	Pestrotsvet Formation Campito Formation
Ushbaspis	1965	Shabakty Formation
Balcoracania	1970	Balcoracana Creek
Emuella	1970	Emu Bay Shale
Megapharanaspis	2006	Emu Bay Shale
Wutingaspis	1944	Mernmerna Formation
Mesolenellus	1993	Sofiekammen Formation Buen Formation
Olenelloides	1894	Fucoid Beds
Biceratops	1971	Pioche Shale
Bradyfallotaspis	1972	
Eopeachella	2009	Delamar Mountains
Laudonia	1956	Mural Formation
Mummaspis	1992	Mural Formation
Nephrolenellus	1993	Pyramid Shale Member Carrara Formation
Nevadella	1936	Poleta Formation Sekwi Formation Tyusser Formation
Paranephrolenellus	2007	
Wanneria	1910	Kinzers Formation
Bristolia	1956	Carrara Formation
Emigrantia (nomen nudum)	1910	Carrara Formation
Bolbolenellus	1993	
Buenellus	1988	Sirius Passet Chilhowee Group
Callavia	1890	Brigus Formation Vila Boim Formation
Chengjiangaspis	1980	Xiaoshiba Lagerstätte
Cirquella	1993	
Daguinaspis	1950	Amouslek Formation
Fallotaspis	1953	Amouslek Formation Idoudine Formation Puerto Blanco Formation Pestrotsvet Formation Erkhelnur Formation Campito Formation
Holmia	1890	Sparagmite Formation
Hydrocephalus	1846	
Fritzolenellus	1998	
Mesonacis	1859	Forteau Formation
Xystridura	1936	Jigaimara Formation
Peachella	1910	
Perrector	1940	Amouslek Formation Alanís Formation
Marsaisia	1953	Amouslek Formation Issafen Formation
Pseudoresserops	1965	Petrotsvet Formation Erkhelnur Formation
Despujolsia	1950	Amouslek Formation
Eops	1940	Alanís Formation
Dolerolichia	1962	Zwethau Formation
Clariondia	1953	Issafen Formation
Realaspis	1958	Los Cortijos Formation
Pararedlichia	1953	Amouslek Formation
Rawops	1953	Amouslek Formation
Boethiusia	2020	Matoppa Formation
Epicurella	2020	Amouslek Formation
Birmanites	1934	
Kendallina	1953	Bison Creek Formation
Dikelocephalus	1852	
Orygmaspis	1938	Morgan Creek Member
Schmalenseeia	1903	
Burlingia	1908	
Entomaspis	1931	
Neodrepanura	2006	Maotianshan Shales
Bigotina	1935	Saint-Jean-de-la-Riviere Formation Pedroche Formation Idoudine Formation Amouslek Formation El'gyan Formation Petrotsvet Formation
Bigotinella	1960	Petrotsvet Formation
Bigotinops	1953	Amouslek Formation Tolbachan Formation
Ouijjania	1953	Amouslek Formation
Demuma	2009	Amouslek Formation
Issendalenia	2019	Igoudine Formation
Tioutella	2019	Igoudine Formation
Pseudobigotina	2019	Amouslek Formation
Hupetina	1975	Igoudine Formation
Eladiolinania	2019	Igoudine Formation Alconera Formation?
Suvorovaella	2019	Petrotsvet Formation El'gyan Formation
Minusinella	1960	Bazaikha Formation
Eofallotaspis	1978	Igoudine Formation Campito Formation
Debrenella	2019	Igoudine Formation
Kingaspis	1935	Burj Formation Tannenknock Formation Chamberlain's Brook Formation Jbel Wawrmast Formation
Kingaspidoides	1953	Jbel Wawrmast Formation Tannenknock Formation Láncara Formation
Cambrosaurura	2022	Tannenknock Formation Jbel Wawrmast Formation
Latikingaspis	1990	Tannenknock Formation
Ornamentaspis	1990	Tannenknock Formation
Ellipsostrenua	1945	Tannenknock Formation Grammajukku Formation
Germaropyge	1957	Skryje Shale Tannenknock Formation
Protolenus	1892	Tannenknock Formation Hanford Brook Formation
Latoucheia	1953	Tannenknock Formation Comley Limestone
Enixus	2009	Tannenknock Formation
Eccaparadoxides	1957	Jince Formation Tannenknock Formation
Cambrophatictor	1998	Jbel Wawrmast Formation Tannenknock Formation
Cambrodaimona	2024	Tannenknock Formation

=== Misc. Artiopoda ===
Genus	Year of Discovery	Location of Fossils
Misszhouia	1985	Maotianshan Shales
Naraoia	1912	Burgess Shale Stephen Formation Maotianshan Shales Bertie Group Balang Formation Emu Bay Shale Duchesnay Formation?
Buenaspis	1999	Sirius Passet
Emucaris	2010	Emu Bay Shale
Kangacaris	2010	Emu Bay Shale Maotianshan Shales
Liwia	1988	Zawiszyn Formation
Helmetia	1912	Burgess Shale Jince Formation
Tegopelte	1975	Burgess Shale Kicking Horse Shale
Retifacies	1989	Maotianshan Shales
Emeraldella	1912	Burgess Shale Wheeler Shale
Molaria	1912	Burgess Shale Sirius Passet
Sidneyia	1911	Burgess Shale Maotianshan Shales
Bailongia	2021	Maotianshan Shales
Luohuilinella	2012	Maotianshan Shales
Panlongia	2006	Guanshan fauna
Pygmaclypeatus	2000	Maotianshan Shales
Sinoburius	1991	Maotianshan Shales
Kodymirus	1965	Paseky Shale
Glypharthrus	1939	McKay Group Clay Creek Guole Formation
Aaveqaspis	2009	Sirius Passet
Thulaspis	2023	Sirius Passet
Saperion	1991	Maotianshan Shales
Squamacula	1997	Maotianshan Shales Emu Bay Shale
Falcatamacaris	2014	Weeks Formation
Zhiwenia	2019	Xiaoshiba Lagerstatte
Australimicola	2012	Emu Bay Shale
Tonglaiia	2023	Maotianshan Shales
Arthroaspis	2013	Sirius Passet
Kwanyinaspis	2005	Maotianshan Shales
Campanamuta	2011	Sirius Passet
Haifengella	2014	Maotianshan Shales
Rhombicalvaria	1987	Maotianshan Shales
Skioldia	1997	Maotianshan Shales
Kuamaia	1987	Maotianshan Shales
Cindarella	1996	Maotianshan Shales
Xandarella	1991	Maotianshan Shales
Zhugeia	2023	Maotianshan Shales
Eozetetes	2016	Emu Bay Shale
Archaeagnostus	1939	Henson Gletscher Formation Kaili Formation Danzhai Formation Zhaojiagou Formation
Eoagnostus	1938	Hatch Hill
Diplorrhina	1847	Buchava Formation Jince Formation Wheeler Shale Kap Stanton Formation
Agnostus	1822	Marjum Biota Linyi Lagerstätte Orsten Fauna Deadwood Formation Kinzers Formation Spence Shale Jince Formation Huaqiao Formation Kap Stanton Formation Empozada Formation Wheeler Shale Holm Dal Formation Rabbitkettle Formation Weeks Formation Marjum Formation Zhumabai Formation Longha Formation Baguamiao Formation Spurs Formation Zhangxia Formation Alum Shale Kulyumbe Formation Dunderburg Formation Klonowka Shale Outwoods Shale
Quadragnostus		Abbey Shale
Gratagnostus	1975	Abbey Shale
Itagnostus	1979	Sandover Beds Hsuchuang Formation Geddes Formation Wheeler Shale Cow Head Group Pentagon Shale
Peronopsis	1847	Mapan Formation Tannenknock Formation Duliujiang Formation Kaili Formation Kensay Formation Quita Formation Abbey Shale Kap Stenton Formation Henson Gletscher Formation Holm Dal Formation Burgess Shale Cow Head Group Jince Formation Valdemiedes Formation Menevia Formation Carrara Formation Cathedral Formation Wheeler Shale El Gavilán Formation Kinzers Formation Jbel Wawrmast Formation Kuonamka Formation Kharatas Formation Mayaktakh Formation Blacksmith Formation Coonigan Formation Shallow Bay Formation Fengjia'ao Formation Tangshi Formation Huaqiao Formation Oville Formation Gory Pieprzowe Shale Campo Pisano Formation Sosink Formation Lincoln Peak Formation Andrarum Limestone Sagdere Formation Stephen Formation Parker Slate Meagher Formation Hess River Formation Zhangxia Formation Koruk Formation Elcho Island Formation Aktas Formation Chingiz Formation Olenek Formation Labaz Formation Alum Shale Asbill Pond Formation Conasauga Formation Xijiadian Formation Yangliugang Formation Quita Creek Formation Zhumabai Formation Valtorres Formation Baguamiao Formation Nelson Limestone Mila Formation
Acmarhachis	1938	Weeks Formation Huayansi Formation Huaqiao Formation Zhumabai Formation Machari Formation Ogon'or Formation Nopah Formation Shallow Bay Formation Rabbitkettle Formation Raiff Limestone Frederick Limestone Chatsworth Formation
Acadagnostus	1939	Currant Bush Limestone Sandover Beds Mapan Formation Changhia Formation Inka Formation Kap Stenton Formation St. John Formation Wheeler Shale
Hypagnostus	1909	Inka Formation Skryje Formation Huaqiao Formation Shallow Bay Formation Forest Hills Formation Wheeler Shale Karsha Formation Jince Formation Empozada Formation Duchesnay Formation Comley Sandstone Baguamiao Formation Zhangxia Formation Marjum Formation Currant Bush Formation Spurs Formation Chingiz Formation Alum Shale Ust-Maya Formation Weeks Formation Asbill Pond Formation Milpillas Formation Yangliugang Formation Paotaishan Formation Xijiadian Formation V-Creek Limestone Aktas Formation Devoncourt Limestone Kul'bich Formation Zhumabai Formation Hillard Limestone St. Albans Shale
Redeagnostus	2012	Quita Formation Henson Gletscher Formation Sosink Formation
Ammagnostus	1967	Mapan Formation Changhia Formation Holm Dal Formation Sosink Formation
Agnostotes	1963	
Lejopyge	1828	
Glyptagnostus	1936	
Baltagnostus		Taitzu Formation Changhia Formation Mapan Formation Corner-of-the-beach Formation
Egyngolia	1980	
Jinghediscus	1985	
Pagetia	1916	Burgess Shale
Acimetopus	1966	
Pentagnostus	1940	Henson Gletscher Formation Carrara Formation Lead Bell Shale Twin Nobs Formation Cow Head Group El Gavilán Formation
Calodiscus	1935	Zwetau Formation Shuangyingshan Formation Brigus Formation Strenuella Limestone Weymouth Formation Kuonamka Formation Akdurug Formation Shabakty Formation Stissing Formation Forteau Formation Bastion Formation Browns Pond Formation Kap Troedsson Formation Gislov Formation Ringstrand Formation Berikul Formation Campo Pisano Formation Sofiekammen Formation
Mallagnostus	1935	Stissing Formation
Tchernyshevioides	1975	Jbel Wawrmast Formation
Runcinodiscus	1976	Comley Limestone
Serrodiscus	1941	Brigus Formation Buen Formation Hell's Mouth Grits Shuangyingshan Formation
Weymouthia	1913	
Analox	1966	
Litometopus	1966	
Meniscuchus	1975	
Ninadiscus	1980	Egyngolskaya Suite
Oodiscus	1966	
Semadiscus	1978	
Stigmadiscus	1966	
Parapagetia	1964	
Tannudiscus	1959	Purley Shale Formation
Chelediscus	1966	
Bathydiscus	1966	
Cobboldites	1943	
Acidiscus	1966	
Condylopyge	1847	Tannenknock Formation
Delgadella	1908	Tyuser Formation
Dicerodiscus	1954	
Pleuroctenium	1847	
Ptychagnostus	1909	
Bolboparia	1966	
Tchernyshevioides	1975	Tannenknock Formation Jbel Wawrmast Formation
Toragnostus	1988	
Tsunyidiscus	1966	
Toledodiscus	2025	Soleras Formation
Dawsonia	1868	Chamberlain's Brook Formation Tannenknock Formation Newgale Formation
Urokodia	1989	Maotianshan Shales
Acanthomeridion	1989	Maotianshan Shales
Beckwithia	1931	Weeks Formation
Tremaglaspis	2003	Weeks Formation
Australaglaspis	2010	Stony Point
Aglaspella	1939	Sandu Formation St. Lawrence Formation
Hesselbonia	2013	Trempealeau Formation
Aglaspis	1862	Potsdam Sandstone
Aglaspoides	1939	St. Lawrence Formation
Chraspedops	1939	St. Lawrence Formation
Cyclopites	1939	St. Lawrence Formation
Flobertia	1992	St. Lawrence Formation
Setaspis	1939	St. Lawrence Formation
Tuboculops	1992	St. Lawrence Formation

== Incertae sedis ==
Genus	Year of Discovery	Location of Fossils
Marrella	1912	Burgess Shale Kaili Formation Balang Formation
Skania	1931	Maotianshan Shales Burgess Shale
Primicaris	2003	Maotianshan Shales
Austromarrella	2012	Monastery Creek Phosphorite
Kiisortoqia	2010	Sirius Passet
Carnarvonia	1912	Burgess Shale
Vladicaris	1995	Paseky Shale
Burgessia	1912	Burgess Shale
Notchia	2015	Weeks Formation
Khankaspis	1969	Snegurovka Formation
Strabops	1901	Potosi Dolomite
Paleomerus	1956	Ociesęki Sandstone Formation Mickwitzia Sandstone
Parapaleomerus	1999	Maotianshan Shales
Worthenella	1911	Burgess Shale
Chuandianella	1975	Maotianshan Shales
Bushizheia	2020	Maotianshan Shales
Combinivalvula	1987	Maotianshan Shales
Diplopyge	1999	Maotianshan Shales
Dongshanocaris	1999	Maotianshan Shales
Jianshania	1999	Maotianshan Shales
Pseudoiulia	1998	Maotianshan Shales
Dongshania	1998	Maotianshan Shales
Pisinnocaris	1998	Maotianshan Shales
Priscansermarinus	1981	Burgess Shale
Kootenichela	2013	Burgess Shale
Forfexicaris	1999	Maotianshan Shales
Yunnanocaris	1999	Maotianshan Shales
Kockurus	1995	Paseky Shale
Occacaris	1999	Maotianshan Shales
Sarotrocercus	1981	Burgess Shale
Messorocaris	2017	Wheeler Shale
Dicranocaris	2008	Wheeler Shale
Nettapezoura	2008	Wheeler Shale
Siriocaris	2009	Sirius Passet
Cambropodus	1990	Wheeler Shale
Xanthomyria	2001	Ust-Majan Formation
Serracaris	1978	Kinzers Formation
Dytikosicula	2015	Marjum Formation
Dicerocaris	1981	Wheeler Shale
Dioxycaris	1929	Spence Shale
Meristosoma	1995	Spence Shale Marjum Formation
Longquania	2008	Wulongqing Formation
Gdowia	1950	Estonia
Cambrolongispinus	2014	Huaqiao Formation
Eolimulus	1968	Ekerums hamm, Öland
Mengdongella	2017	Wangcun Lagerstätte
Sunella	1965	Maotianshan Shales
Caudicaella	2021	Shujingtuo Formation
Astutuscaris	2022	Wulongqing Formation
Masticaris	2022	Mount Clark Formation
Silesicaris	1929	Bober-Katzbach Mountains
Mafangia	2002	Maotianshan Shales
Emeiella	1975	Maotianshan Shales
Cyathocephalus	1999	Maotianshan Shales
Wudingella	1974	Maotianshan Shales
Syrrhaptis	1999	Maotianshan Shales
Mafangocaris	2002	Maotianshan Shales
Ovalicephalus	2002	Maotianshan Shales
Pterotrum	2002	Maotianshan Shales
Tauricornicaris	2017	Maotianshan Shales

== Notes ==
1. (here taken to mean all members of a monophyletised Dinocaridida and everything closer to it than any other extant phylum)
2. Myriapod affinity dubious, may be a lobopodian.
3. Date obtained from supplementary material.
