= Geology of New Brunswick =

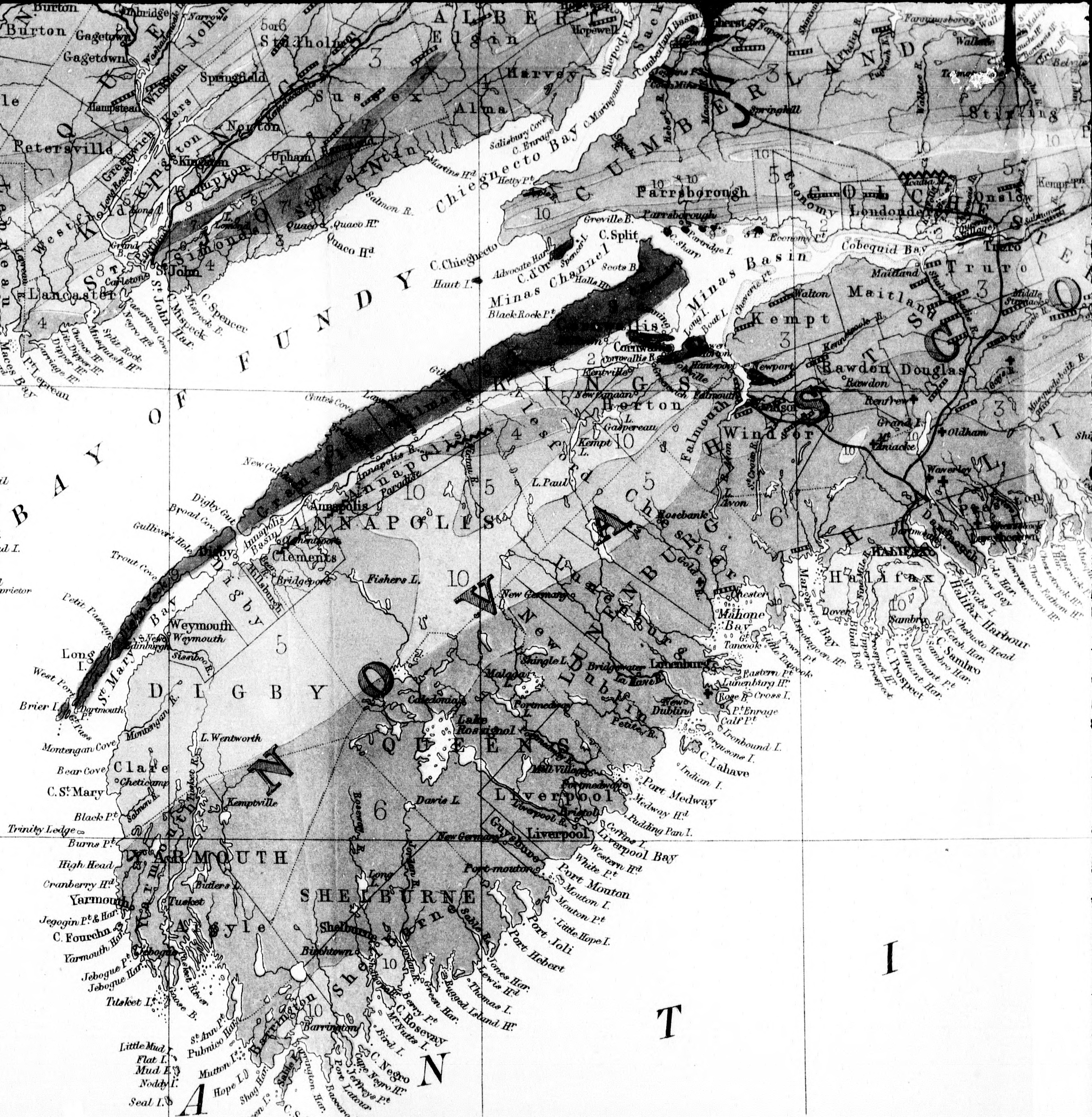
Geological map of area surrounding the Bay of Fundy (1868 vintage).

== Paleozoic New Brunswick ==
- Forest Hills Formation
- Hanford Brook Formation
- St. John Group
- Wades Lane Formation
- Avalonia
- Northern Appalachians seismic zone
- Bathurst Mining Camp
- Mount Carleton Provincial Park
- Coastal Volcanic Belt
- Fundy Basin
- Chignecto Basin
- Mount Pleasant Caldera
- Sugarloaf Mountain
- Back Bay Formation
- Limestone Point Formation
- Petit Rocher Formation
- Campbellton Formation
- Dalhousie Group
- La Garde Formation
- Leda Clay Formation
- Maritime Plain

== Mesozoic New Brunswick ==
- stub
