= Asbil =

Asbil or Asbill is a surname. Notable people with this name include:

- Walter Asbil (1932–2023), Canadian Anglican bishop
- Vernon Asbill (born 1945), American politician
- Andrew Asbil (born 1961), Canadian Anglican bishop

== See also ==
- Asbill Massacre
- Asbill Pond Formation
