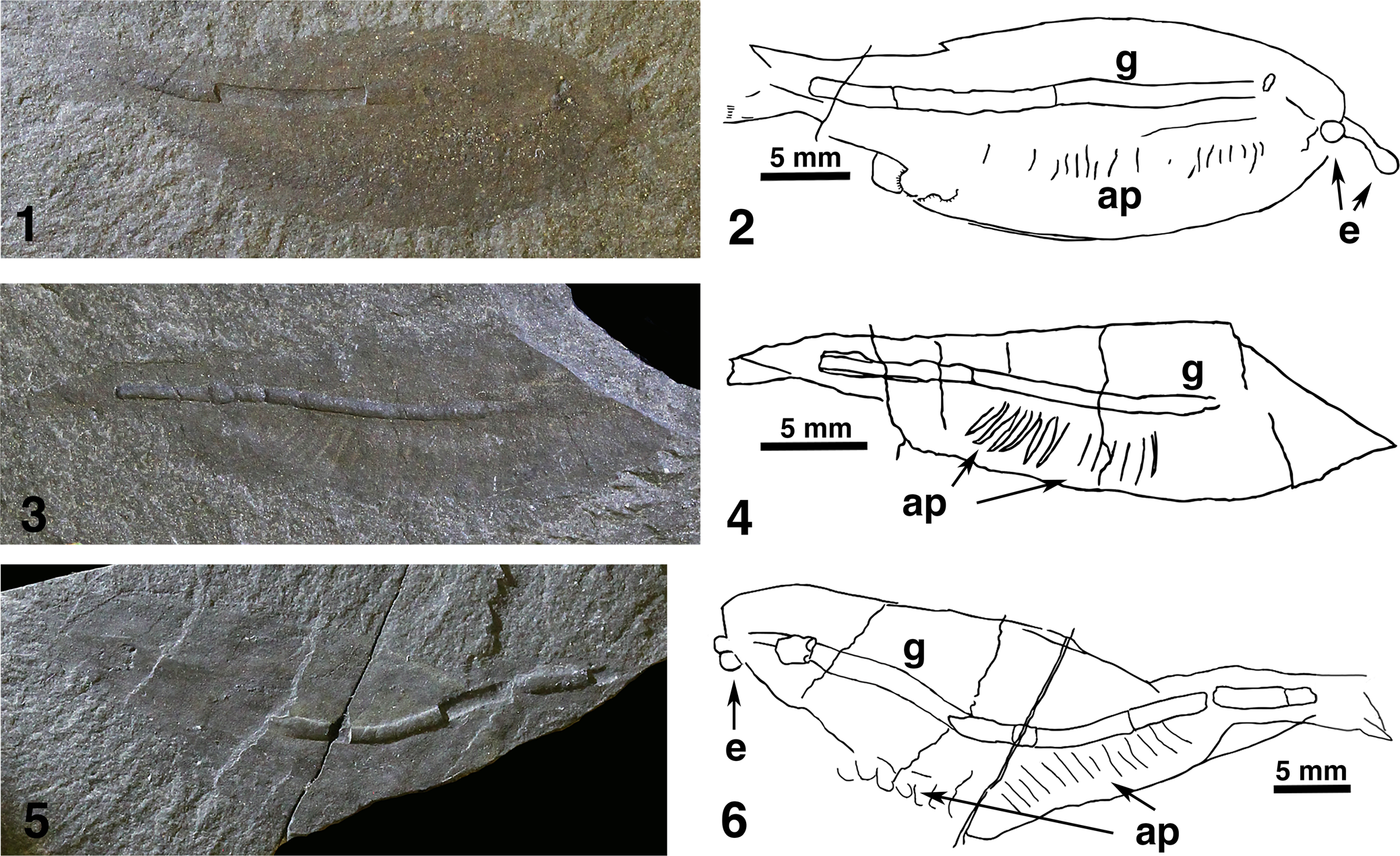

Scientific classification
- Kingdom: Animalia
- Phylum: Arthropoda
- Family: Odaraiidae (?)
- Genus: Vermontcaris Pari, Briggs & Gaines, 2022
- Species: V. montcalmi

Binomial name
- Vermontcaris montcalmi Pari, Briggs & Gaines, 2022

= Vermontcaris =

Vermontcaris Temporal range: Cambrian Stage 4

Extinct genus of arthropods

Vermontcaris is a genus of extinct bivalved arthropod, possibly an odaraiid. Its fossils have been discovered in the Parker Slate lagerstätte.

== Discovery and naming ==
Vermontcaris was discovered in the Parker Slate lagerstätte of Vermont. The genus name refers to the state in which it was found, while the species name refers to the Montcalm family, who owned the land on which the specimens of this species were discovered.

== Description ==
Vermontcaris had a cephalon with a pair of eyes located on stalks and a large, bivalved carapace. It had a thorax with an estimated over 30 to over 37 segments, each with at least one pair of biramous limbs. The abdomen had 4–5 segments without limbs. The abdomen terminated in a telson with a leaf-shaped structure on either side.

== Taxonomy ==
The genus contains one species, V. montcalmi. Vermontcaris may be an odaraiid.

== Paleoecology ==
Other organisms from the Parker Slate lagerstätte include Fuxianospira gyrata, Leptomitus zitteli, ?Protospongia hicksi, ?Ottoia sp., Amplectobeluidae indet., Tuzoia polleni, Protocaris marshi, ?Herpetogastor sp. and Emmonsaspis cambrensis.
