= Sinsk Event =

The Sinsk Event is the first mass extinction of the Phanerozoic eon, occurring approximately 513.5 million years ago during early Stage 4 of the Cambrian period. It is named after the Sinsk Formation on the Siberian Platform, where the extinction is most clearly expressed in the rock record. The event marks the end of the evolutionary radiation started by the Cambrian explosion and wiped out more than 60% of metazoan species globally; biodiversity did not return to pre-extinction levels until the early Ordovician.

== Magnitude and distribution ==
Extinction rates during the Sinsk Event are comparable to those of later events such as the Late Ordovician and Late Devonian extinctions, but it has historically been excluded from the "Big Five" mass extinctions because the absolute number of genera in the early Cambrian period was low relative to the rest of the Phanerozoic.

Diversity losses associated with the Sinsk Event are documented on multiple paleocontinents, including the Siberian Platform, Mongolia, Laurentia, Morocco, Spain, Sardinia, Australia, and South China.

== Causes and mechanisms ==
The proximate kill mechanism is widely interpreted as widespread marine anoxia. Globally, the interval is characterized by an increase in unbioturbated black shales and a shift from coupled to uncoupled carbon and sulfur isotopic records on the Siberian Platform, both consistent with a sharp decline in ocean oxygen. The event coincided with a major marine transgression, and upwelling of deeper anoxic waters onto shallow shelf settings is considered the primary driver.

The extinction is approximately synchronous with the emplacement of the Kalkarindji Large Igneous Province in Australia (≈514–513 Ma), which probably released large volumes of volcanic CO₂ and triggered a hyperthermal interval, promoting ocean warming and deoxygenation. An additional tectonic trigger has been proposed: synchronous pulses of supracrustal contraction along the margin of Gondwana, recorded in trilobite distributions from the Ross Orogen (Antarctica) and the Delamerian Orogen (Australia), may have driven the loss of shallow marine carbonate habitats and the extrusion of the Kalkarindji basalts.

== Ecological impact and aftermath ==
=== Extinction patterns ===
The Sinsk Event devastated reef-associated faunas, particularly the archaeocyatha sponges, which had dominated Cambrian reefs, along with corallimorphs, halkieriids, stenothecoida, and much of the small shelly fossil assemblage.

A 2025 functional-diversity study by Murphy et al. reconstructed metazoan trait dynamics on the Siberian Platform from approximately 529 to 508 Ma and found that the initial extinction pulse was largely non-selective with respect to functional traits: the perturbation appears to have been severe enough that no particular ecological strategy conferred preferential survival.

=== Recovery and refugia ===
Recovery was strongly selective. Motile, unattached taxa with broad depth tolerances and diversified feeding modes (notably trilobites, helcionelloida molluscs, hyolitha, protoconodonts, and brachiopods) diversified rapidly in the aftermath, while sessile, heavily calcified, shallow-water filter-feeders either failed to recover or went extinct in the following few million years. Siliceous sponges also diversified post-extinction, consistent with the tolerance of modern siliceous demosponges to low oxygen levels.

The same study identified a decoupling of taxonomic and functional diversity after the extinction: species richness rebounded within roughly 2.5–5 million years, but functional richness continued to decline until about 508 Ma, by which point the surviving communities occupied a substantially different region of functional space than their pre-Sinsk predecessors.

Because the Sinsk Event preferentially affected shallow-shelf ecosystems, deeper-water environments may have served as refugia. Support for this comes from the 2026 description of the Huayuan biota in southern China, an exceptionally preserved deep-water Lagerstätte of 8,681 specimens of 153 species (more than half previously unknown) that postdates the extinction. Many Huayuan taxa closely resemble those of the Burgess Shale, suggesting that deep-water Cambrian faunas were globally connected and that they survived the event with much of their ecological structure intact.
