= Horton Group =

Geologic group in New Brunswick, Canada

- Stratigraphic range: Carboniferous
- Type: Group

Location
- Region: New Brunswick
- Country: Canada

The Horton Group is a geologic group in New Brunswick. It preserves fossils dating back to the Carboniferous period.

== See also ==
- List of fossiliferous stratigraphic units in New Brunswick
