= List of fossiliferous stratigraphic units in New Brunswick =

This is a list of fossiliferous stratigraphic units in New Brunswick, Canada.

Group or Formation	Period	Notes
Back Bay Formation	Silurian	
Cambellton Formation	Devonian	
Campbellton Formation	Devonian	
Canso Formation	Carboniferous	
Chamberlain's Brook Formation	Cambrian	
Champlain Clay Formation	Canada	
Dalhouse Formation	Devonian	
Dalhousie Shale Formation	Devonian	
Dalhousie Group/La Garde Formation	Devonian	
Gaspe Sandstone Group/Cambellton Formation	Devonian	
Hanford Brook Formation	Cambrian	
Horton Group/Albert Formation	Carboniferous	
Horton Group/Kennebecasis Formation	Carboniferous	
Horton Group/Memramcook Formation	Carboniferous	
La Garde Formation	Devonian	
La Vieille Formation	Silurian	
Lancaster Formation	Carboniferous	
Leda Clay Formation	Lower	
Limestone Point Formation	Silurian	
Petit Rocher Formation	Silurian	
Pictou Formation	Carboniferous	
St. John Group/Forest Hills Formation	Cambrian	
St. John Group/Hanford Brook Formation	Cambrian	
Wades Lane Formation	Cambrian	
