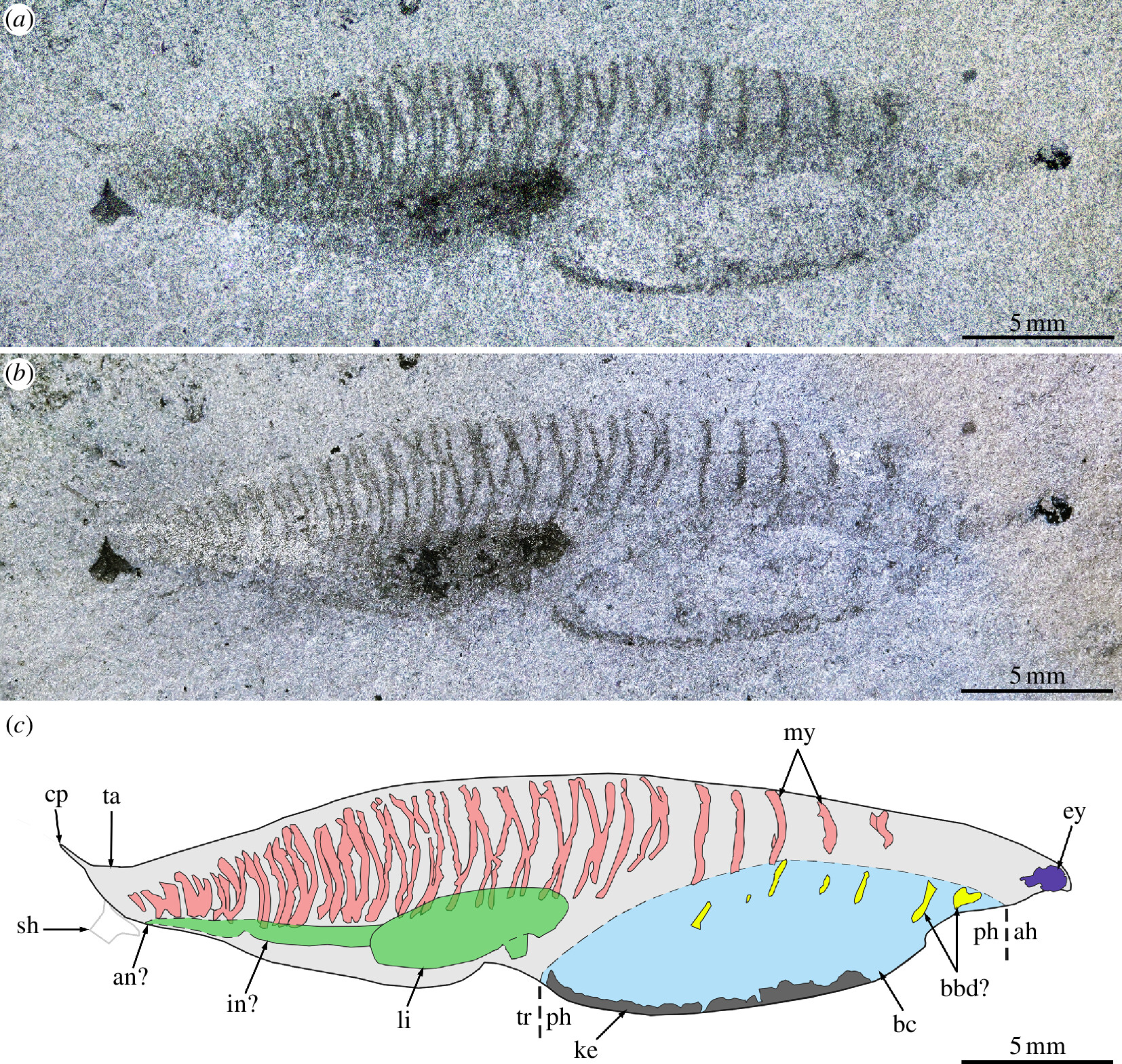
- Holotype specimen

Scientific classification
- Kingdom: Animalia
- Phylum: Chordata
- Infraphylum: Agnatha
- Genus: †Nuucichthys; Lerosey-Aubril & Ortega-Hernández, 2024

Type species
- Nuucichthys rhynchocephalus Lerosey-Aubril & Ortega-Hernández, 2024

= Nuucichthys =

Nuucichthys Temporal range: Cambrian, Drumian

Genus of early vertebrates

Nuucichthys (meaning "Núu-ci fish") is an extinct genus of stem-group vertebrates known from the Cambrian (Miaolingian series) Marjum Formation of Utah, United States. The genus contains a single species, N. rhynchocephalus, known from a single individual, representing the first Cambrian vertebrate from the Great Basin region of North America. Nuucichthys provides insights into the diversity of Cambrian vertebrates, which are more rare in Laurentian deposits. Taxonomic studies recover this genus as closely related to other Laurentian stem-vertebrates such as Metaspriggina and Emmonaspis (possible early vertebrate).

== History and Research ==
The Nuucichthys holotype, UMNH.IP.6084, was discovered in sediments belonging to the House Range of Utah and sent to the Natural History Museum of Utah. The specimen consists of a well preserved individual that is flattened laterally. Although the exact origin of this fossil is uncertain, it most likely comes from the Ptychagnostus punctuosus biozone, located in the middle of the Marjum Formation.

The genus name, Nuucichthys, combines "Núu-ci", the name of the Ute tribe meaning "the people", with the Greek word ichthys, meaning "fish". The name refers to the type locality on lands once inhabited by the Ute people. The species name, rhynchocephalus, is derived from the Greek words rhynchos, meaning "beak" or "snout" and kephale, meaning "head", which refers to the projecting region of the front of the head observed in this species.

== Description ==
Size of Nuucichthys (navy blue) and other Cambrian chordates compared to a human hand

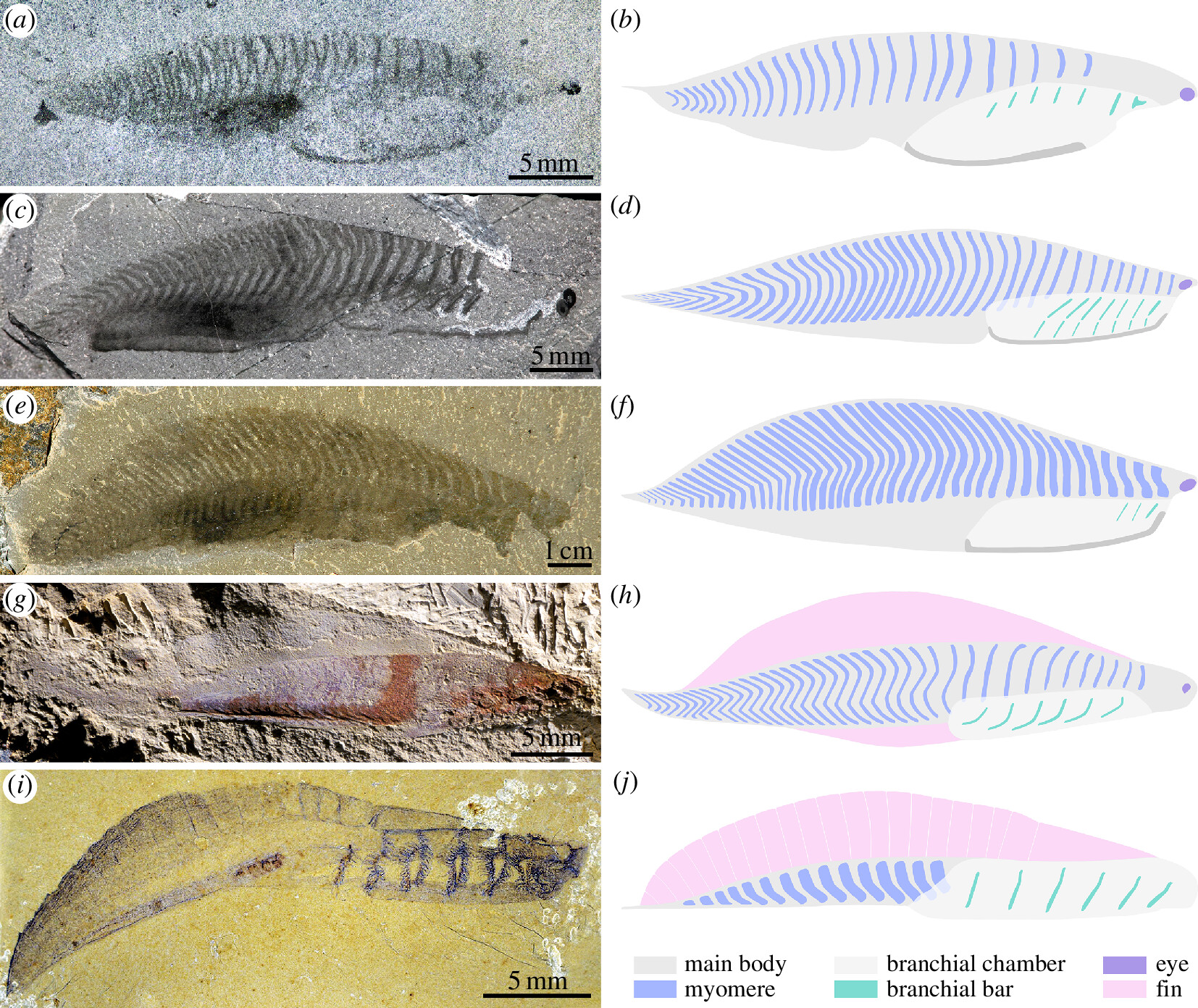
Comparison of fossil and diagrammatic reconstructions (a,b) of Nuucichthys with other Cambrian chordates, including (c,d) Metaspriggina, (e,f) Emmonsaspis, (g,h) Myllokunmingia, and (i,j) Yunnanozoon

The holotype specimen of Nuucichthys is around 32.4 millimeters (1.28 inches) long (excluding the eyes and caudal region), and is 7.9 millimeters (0.31 inches) tall. The body of this genus is fusiform in shape, and possess a caudal region lacking any evidence for a fin. The body contained around 40 myomeres that ran along its length, and seem to have shrunk in size after death. The ventral plane of this genus contains a large branchial chamber, and a set of organs which have been interpreted as the liver, and a possible intestine and anus. The caudal region of the body possesses a spiniform structure, which has also been found in animals like Yunnanozoon. By far the most distinguishing feature of this genus is its elongated cephalic region, which helps differentiate it from other Cambrian chordates. This region differentiates from the rest of the body due to the lack of noticeable myomeres, and a sudden change in elevation. This region also possesses a set of paired eyes that are distinct from the various branchial elements. The eyes themselves were well developed camera-type lenses similar to those seen in modern lampreys and Metaspriggina. Like the other known Laurentian stem-vertebrates, this genus seems to lack any sort of fins, and swam in a very different matter to other chordates at the time. This genus also lacks any form of feeding apparatus (or at least ones that would survive fossilization).

== Classification ==
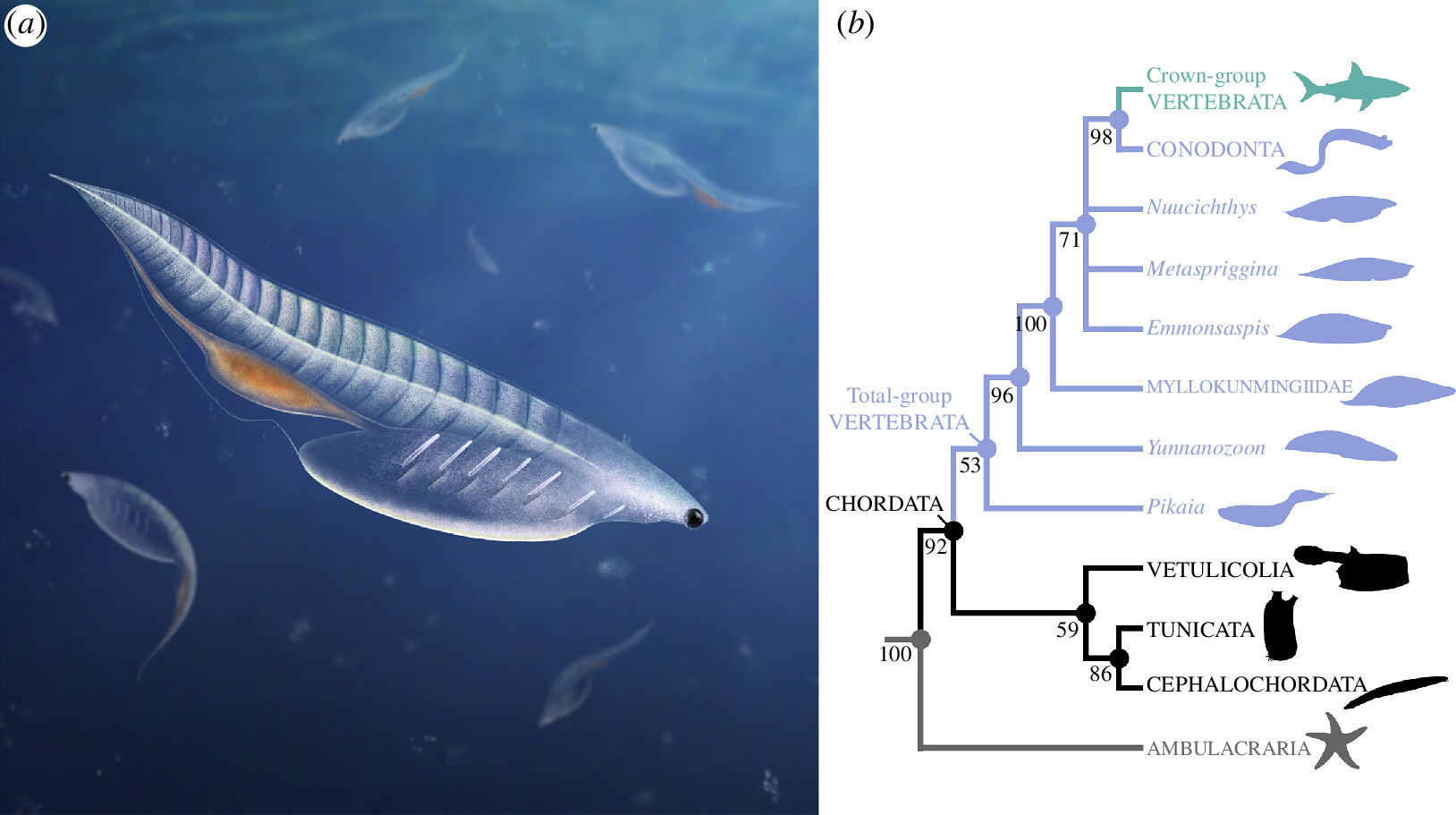
Life restoration of Nuucichthys in a nektonic environment, and its classification.

In Lerosey-Aubril & Ortega-Hernández, 2024, Nuucichthys was classified as a stem-group vertebrate within the total group vertebrata. More specifically, it was found to form a polytomy with the other Laurentian stem-vertebrates, Metaspriggina and Emmonsaspis, and was found to be closely related to the myllokunmingiids. The classification also found that the conodonts, a grouping of jawless vertebrates, formed a sister clade to the crown group vertebrates. It also found that the vetulicolians, a phylum of deuterostome animals, to be basal chordates related to tunicates and cephalochordates.

Cladogram following Lerosey-Aubril and Ortega-Hernández 2024 (note that the finding of a closer relationship between cephalochordates and tunicates than either is to vertebrates is contradicted by genetic evidence)

- Chordata
  - - †Vetulicolia
    - - Cephalochordata
      - Tunicata
  - Vertebrata total group
    - †Pikaia
    - - †Yunnanozoon
      - - †Myllokunmingiidae
        - - †Nuucichthys
          - †Metaspriggina
          - †Emmonsaspis
          - - †Conodonta
            - Crown group Vertebrata

== Paleoecology ==
Due to fins of any kind being absent in this genus, it was hypothesized by the 2024 description that Nuucichthys was not an active swimmer, and that its eyes were facing laterally to the rest of the body. This set of features suggests that it occupied a planktonektonic niche (living in the water column without swimming much). Because no feeding structures are known, and the presumed nektonic lifestyle, it is likely that this animal was likely microphagous, most likely a suspension feeder. This niche has also been suggested for its close relatives as well based on similarities in their body plans.
