= Lancaster Formation =

Geologic formation in New Brunswick

- Stratigraphic range: Carboniferous
- Type: Formation

Location
- Region: New Brunswick
- Country: Canada

The Lancaster Formation is a geologic formation in New Brunswick, Canada. It preserves fossils dating back to the Carboniferous period.

== See also ==
- List of fossiliferous stratigraphic units in New Brunswick
