= Sinsk Formation =

Geologic formation in Russia

- Stratigraphic range: Botomian
- Type: Formation
- Underlies: Kutorgina Formation
- Overlies: Perekhod Formation
- Thickness: ~60 m

Location
- Region: Siberian Platform
- Country: Russia

The Sinsk Formation is a geologic formation in Central Siberia, Russia, exposed along the Lena River. It preserves fossils dating back to the Botomian stage of the Cambrian (corresponding to Cambrian Series 2). It notably contained the Sinsk Algal Lens, a Lagerstätte which preserved some soft-bodied animals that would not typically be preserved as fossils. However, the Sinsk Algal Lens has largely been destroyed by commercial fossil collectors.

== Paleobiota ==
After Ivantsov et al., 2005 and others

=== Paleobiota ===
Paleobiota
Genus	Species	Notes
Siberion	S. lenaicus	Namesake genus of Siberiida.
Phytophilaspis	P. pergamena	Xandarellid artiopod
Jakutus	J. primigenius	Corynexochid trilobite
Eldonia	E. ?ludwigi	Cambroernid, global distribution
Lenica	L. unica, L. rigbyi	Hexactinellid sponge
Archiasterella	A. sp	Chancellorid
Wapkia	W. petila	Protomonaxonid sponge
Cambrorhytium	C. minor	Indeterminate cnidarian?
Corallioscolex	C. labyrinthus	Palaeoscolecid worm
Palaeoscolex	P. spinosus, P. lubovae	Palaeoscolecid worm
Sahascolex	S. labyrinthus	Palaeoscolecid worm
Microdictyon	M. ?ovalum	Eoconchariid lobopodian
Delgadella	D. lenaica	Agnostid
Edelsteinaspis	E. ornata, E. granulata	Corynexochid trilobite
Bergeroniaspis	B. lenaica, B. divergens	Redlichiid trilobite
Bergeroniellus	B. spinosus	Redlichiid trilobite
Binodaspis	B. secunda	Ptychopariid trilobite
Sinskolutella	S. ordinata	Bradoriid
Yakutingella	Y. intricata	Bradoriid
Eoobolus	E. sp	Lingulate brachiopod
Linnarssonia	L. sp	Lingulate brachiopod
Botsfordia	L. sp	Lingulate brachiopod
Nisusia	N. sp?	Rhynchonellate brachiopod
Wiwaxia	W. sp	Wiwaxiid mollusc
Tanchaiella	T. sp	Hexactinellid sponge
Ivantsovia	I. andreyi	Protomonaxonid sponge
Dodecaactinella	D. sp	Calcarean sponge
Nabaviella	N. sp	Indeterminate sponge
Cjulanciella	C. asimmetrica	Indeterminate sponge
Neomenispongia	N. diazoma, N. plexa	Early demosponge
Keithospongos	K. loricatus	Stem-demosponge?
Wronascolex	W. lubovae, W. spinosus	Palaeoscolecid worm
Piloscolex	P. platum	Palaeoscolecid worm
Vladipriapulus	V. malakhovi	Priapulid worm
Judomia	J. rossea	Redlichiid trilobite
Bathyuriscellus	B. sinensis	Corynexochid trilobite
Aldonaia	A. ornata	Ptychopariid trilobite
Duibianella	D. sp	Bradoriid
Tubuterium	T. ivantsovi	Bradoriid
Tuzoia	T. sp	Tuzoiid hymenocarine

== See also ==
- List of fossiliferous stratigraphic units in Russia
- Sinsk Event
