= Huayuan biota =

Cambrian fossil site in Hunan, China

The Huayuan biota is a diverse collection of fossils dominated by arthropods, sponges and cnidarians and including soft-bodied forms preserved with cellular tissues from a Cambrian Stage 4 Burgess Shale-type Lagerstätte from the Yangtze Block (Hunan, China). Dating to approximately 512 million years ago, the biota was deposited shortly after the Sinsk event, the first mass extinction of the Phanerozoic eon, and fills a critical gap in the Cambrian fossil record between older deposits such as the Chengjiang biota and younger ones like the Burgess Shale.

== Discovery and age ==
The Huayuan biota was identified by a research team from the Nanjing Institute of Geology and Palaeontology (NIGPAS) of the Chinese Academy of Sciences, led by paleontologist Han Zeng and senior author Maoyan Zhu. The fossil deposit is located in Huayuan County, Xiangxi Tujia and Miao Autonomous Prefecture, Hunan Province, in southern China. Fieldwork was conducted at a single quarry between 2021 and 2024, yielding more than 50,000 fossil specimens, of which 8,681 were formally examined and classified. The findings were published on 28 January 2026 in the journal Nature.

== Geologic setting ==
The Huayuan biota is preserved in fine-grained mudstone deposited in an outer continental shelf, deep-water environment on the Yangtze Block, a Precambrian craton forming the core of the South China Block.

== Fossil description ==
From the 8,681 formally classified specimens, researchers documented 153 animal species belonging to 16 phylum-level clades. Of these, 91 species (approximately 59%) were previously unknown to science. Arthropods, poriferans (sponges), and cnidarians are the most abundant groups, but the biota also includes priapulids, lobopodians, ctenophores, and pelagic tunicates, among others.

== Similar biota ==
The Huayuan biota belongs to a small group of Cambrian Burgess Shale-type Lagerstätten that preserve soft-bodied organisms in exceptional detail. The most closely comparable deposits are the Chengjiang biota (~518 Ma, Yunnan, China), the Qingjiang biota (~518 Ma, Hubei, China), and the Burgess Shale (~508 Ma, British Columbia, Canada). The site has been independently praised by researchers not involved in the discovery. Geologist Robert Gaines of Pomona College described the deposit as a world-class fossil site that fills a critical gap in Earth's history, with diversity and preservation quality rivaling those of the Chengjiang and Burgess Shale sites.

== See also ==
- Burgess Shale
- Lagerstätten
- Maotianshan Shales
- Qingjiang biota
