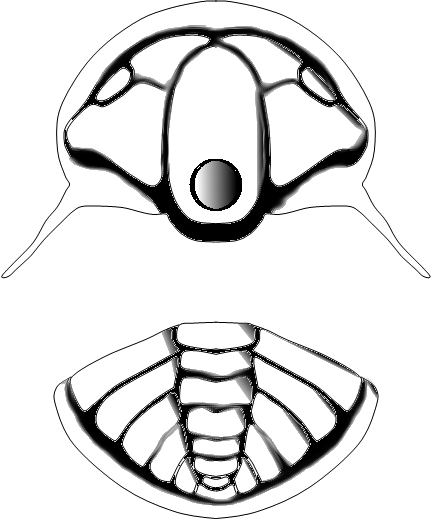
- Tchernyshevioides ninae

Scientific classification
- Domain: Eukaryota
- Kingdom: Animalia
- Phylum: Arthropoda
- Class: †Trilobita (?)
- Order: †Agnostida
- Suborder: †Eodiscina
- Superfamily: †Eodiscoidea
- Family: †Hebediscidae; Kobayashi, 1944

Genera
- Delgadella; Dicerodiscus; Hebediscus; Luvsanodiscus; Limbadiscus; Neopagetina; Parapagetia; Tchernyshevioides

Synonyms
- Delgadoiinae; Pagetiellinae; Dicerodiscinae

= Hebediscidae =

Hebediscidae Temporal range: Lower Cambrian

Hebediscidae is a family of trilobites belonging to the order Agnostida that lived during the Lower Cambrian (Atdabanian to Toyonian). They are small or very small, and have a thorax of two or three segments. The Hebediscidae include five genera (see box).

== Taxonomy ==
The Hebediscidae probably descended from the Tsunyidiscidae and gave rise to the Weymouthiidae.

== Description ==
Like all Agnostida, the Hebediscidae are diminutive and the headshield (or cephalon) and tailshield (or pygidium) are of approximately the same size (or isopygous) and outline. In the Hebediscidae, the central raised area of the cephalon (or glabella) is wide at its rear end, has parallel sides or tapers forward, and without transverse glabellar furrows, although the lobes may be apparent if they are expanded. A three segment thorax is known in Hebediscus, Delgadella and Tchernyshevioides. The pygidium has a wide, tapering axis of more than four segments.
