= Notchia =

Notchia Temporal range: Guzhangian
- Diagram of Notchia

Scientific classification
- Domain: Eukaryota
- Kingdom: Animalia
- Phylum: Arthropoda
- Class: incertae sedis
- Genus: †Notchia; Lerosey-Aubril, 2015
- Species: †N. weugi

Binomial name
- †Notchia weugi Lerosey-Aubril, 2015

Extinct genus of enigmatic arthropod

Notchia weugi is a species of enigmatic arthropod from the Weeks Formation of Utah. It is the only species in the genus Notchia.

== Description ==
Notchia has a wide, featureless head shield with rounded genal angles and no eyes (whether the eyes are absent or just ventrally located is unclear). The trunk consists of 12 tergites with the third being widest and the body width decreasing posterior of this point. The first tergite is mostly concealed under the head shield, with the rest seemingly overlapping each other. The rest of the tergites also appear quite similar, although the lattermost are somewhat longer. The telson is rectangular, with four spines on its posterior end. Unusually, Notchia preserves digestive glands, these being represented by dark "blobs" on the fossil. Seven pairs are preserved, decreasing in length and complexity posteriorly. The two cephalic glands and the first trunk gland consist of two long branches, the first gland being thinner than the second and in turn the third. The anterior branch of each seems to further branch at its end, with the posterior being shorter and unbranched. The second to fourth trunk glands are rather similar in shape, being large and club-like. The fifth pair is only preserved via a "halo" on the fossil where the left gland would be, although this suggests it was similar to the rest.

== Classification ==
Notchia shares many similarities with various disparate clades, although none match it exactly. Strabopids seem similar, with their non-styliform telson and short cephalons, however Notchia differs in multiple aspects, including a lack of eyes, the shape of the body, and an unusual telson shape. Sidneyia also appears similar, but it too does not resemble Notchia exactly, with the former having a tail fan and differing body shape. Interestingly, Notchia share similarities with some chelicerates, such as a reduced first tergite, although no chelicerate so far has such a short cephalon or similar amounts of trunk segments. The digestive glands are also unusual, due to possessing two pairs of them alongside more simple structures like those of trilobites.

== Etymology ==
Notchia derives from Notch Peak, one of the highest mountains in the House Range where the fossil was found. The species name weugi honours Andries Weug, who donated the holotype for study.
