= Shallow Bay Formation =

Geologic formation in Canada

- Stratigraphic range: Cambrian - Ordovician
- Type: Formation

Location
- Region: Newfoundland and Labrador
- Country: Canada

The Shallow Bay Formation is a geologic formation in Newfoundland and Labrador. It preserves fossils dating back to the Cambrian and Ordovician periods.

== See also ==
- List of fossiliferous stratigraphic units in Newfoundland and Labrador
