= Kockurus =

Scientific classification
- Kingdom: Animalia
- Phylum: Arthropoda
- Subphylum: ?Artiopoda
- Order: ?Aglaspidida
- Family: incertae sedis
- Genus: Kockurus Chlupáč, 1995
- Species: K. grandis

Binomial name
- Kockurus grandis Chlupáč, 1995

Genus of Cambrian arthropod

Kockurus is a problematic genus of Cambrian arthropod, known from the Czech Republic, which bears some resemblance to the eurypterids, aglaspidids and chelicerates. It is diagnostic of a small and low-diversity fauna endemic to the area, which dwelt in brackish waters.

Along with the very closely related Kodymirus, it is an enigmatic Cambrian arthropod whose precise taxonomic affinity is uncertain, but is best considered to be a stem-group or ally of the aglaspidids.
