= Hillard Limestone =

Geologic formation in Alaska, United States

- Stratigraphic range: Cambrian
- Type: Formation

Lithology
- Primary: Limestone
- Other: Chert, chalcedony

Location
- Region: Alaska
- Country: United States

Type section
- Named for: Hillard Peak

The Hillard Limestone is a geologic formation in Alaska. It preserves fossils dating back to the Cambrian period.

== See also ==
- List of fossiliferous stratigraphic units in Alaska
- Paleontology in Alaska
