= Parker Slate =

Cambrian geological formation in Vermont known for exceptional fossil preservation

- Stratigraphic range: Cambrian Stage 4
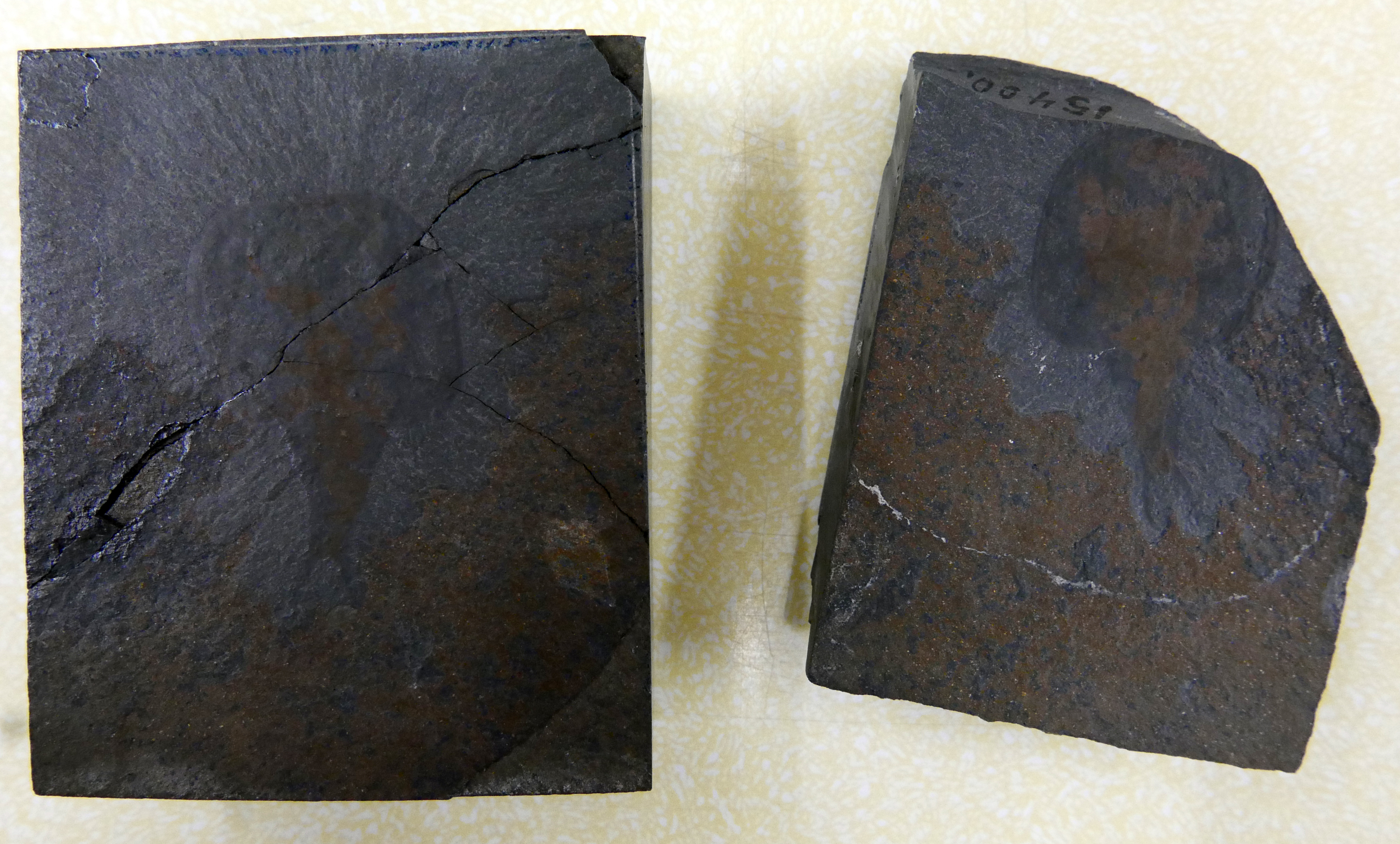
- Holotype of Protocaris a bivalved arthropod known from the Parker Slate
- Type: Formation

Location
- Region: Vermont
- Country: United States

The Parker Slate is a geologic formation in northwestern Vermont near St. Albans. It preserves fossils dating back to the Cambrian period. This formation preserves the first known lagerstätte from the Cambrian, 25 years before the Burgess Shale. However, the site was lost from the 1880s (with the few people who found it afterwards never recording soft-bodied fossils) until 2021 when new exceptional material was recovered from this formation. The rarity of fossils seems to be genuine, since the exceptional preservation recorded shows decay was not a large factor. Chordates like Emmonsaspis and hymenocarines like Vermontcaris are preserved, alongside amplectobeluid radiodonts and large quantities of complete trilobites.

== See also ==
- Emmonsaspis
- List of fossiliferous stratigraphic units in Vermont
- Paleontology in Vermont
