= Balang Formation =

Geological formation in China

- Stratigraphic range: Cambrian Stage 4
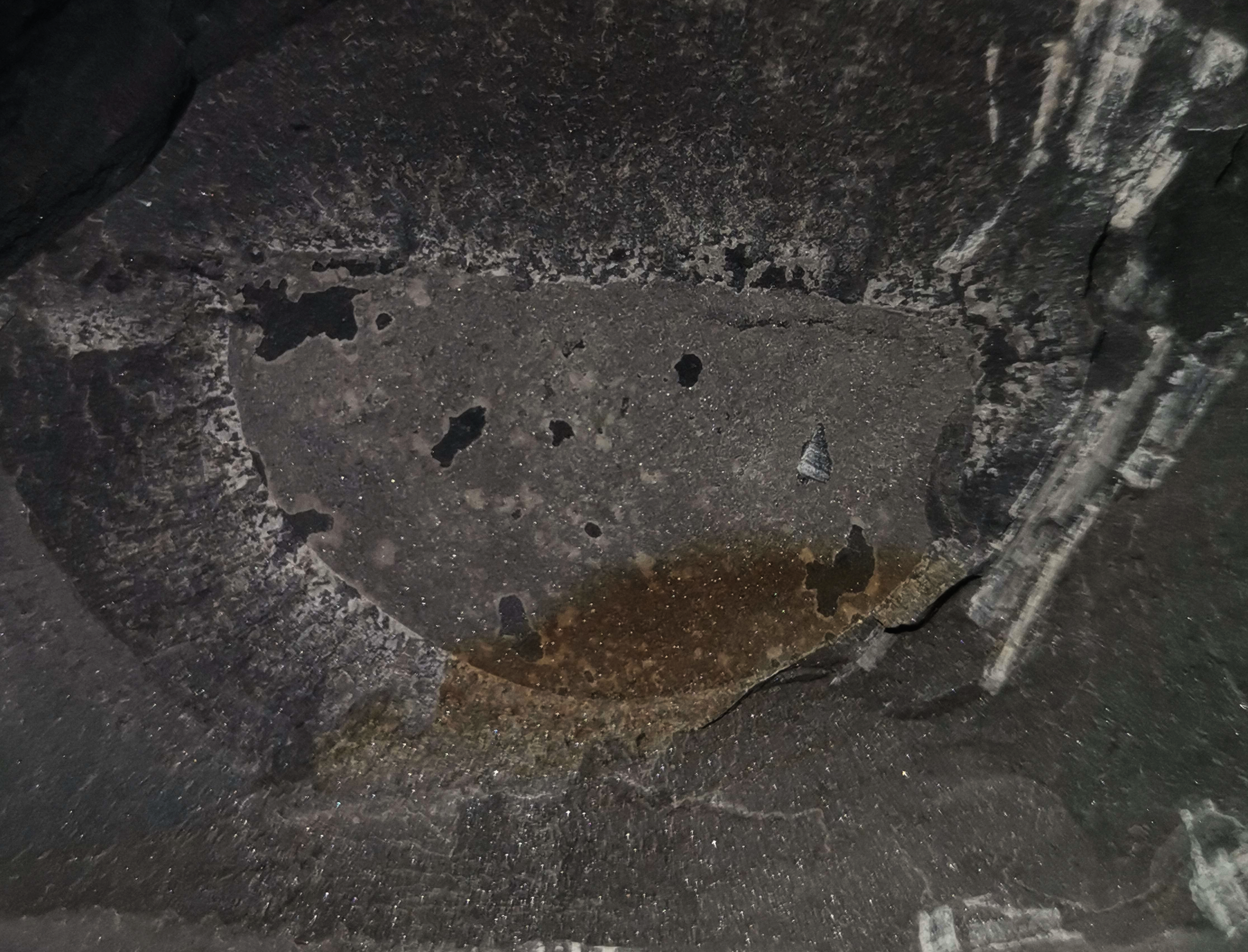
- An Isoxys specimen from the Balang Formation.
- Type: Geological formation
- Thickness: 100 m (330 ft) to 658 m (2,159 ft)

Lithology
- Primary: Shale, Calcareous mudstone
- Other: Limestone, Siltstone

Location
- Country: China

The Balang formation, is a Cambrian Period geological formation, which outcrops in western Hunan and eastern Guizhou in southern China. It contains Burgess Shale-type soft-bodied fossils. It is intermediate in age between the Chengjiang and Kaili lagerstatten. It contains a low diversity of trilobites.
