= Clariondia =

Clariondia Temporal range: Late Atdabanian

Scientific classification
- Kingdom: Animalia
- Phylum: Arthropoda
- Clade: †Artiopoda
- Class: †Trilobita
- Order: †Redlichiida
- Family: †Saukiandidae
- Genus: †Clariondia; Hupé, 1953

Extinct genus of trilobites

Clariondia is an extinct genus from a well-known class of fossil marine arthropods, the trilobites. It lived during the late Atdabanian stage, which lasted from 530 to 524 million years ago during the early part of the Cambrian Period.
