= Vermilion Formation =

Geological formation in BC, Canada

- Stratigraphic range: Cambrian
- Type: Formation

Location
- Region: British Columbia
- Country: Canada

The Vermilion Formation is a geologic formation in British Columbia. It preserves fossils dating back to the Cambrian period.

== See also ==
- List of fossiliferous stratigraphic units in British Columbia
