= Pleasant Hill Limestone =

Geologic formation in Pennsylvania

- Stratigraphic range: Cambrian
- Type: Formation
- Underlies: Warrior Limestone
- Overlies: Waynesboro Formation

Location
- Region: Pennsylvania
- Country: United States

The Pleasant Hill Limestone is a geologic formation in Pennsylvania. It preserves fossils dating back to the Cambrian period.

== See also ==
- List of fossiliferous stratigraphic units in Pennsylvania
- Paleontology in Pennsylvania
