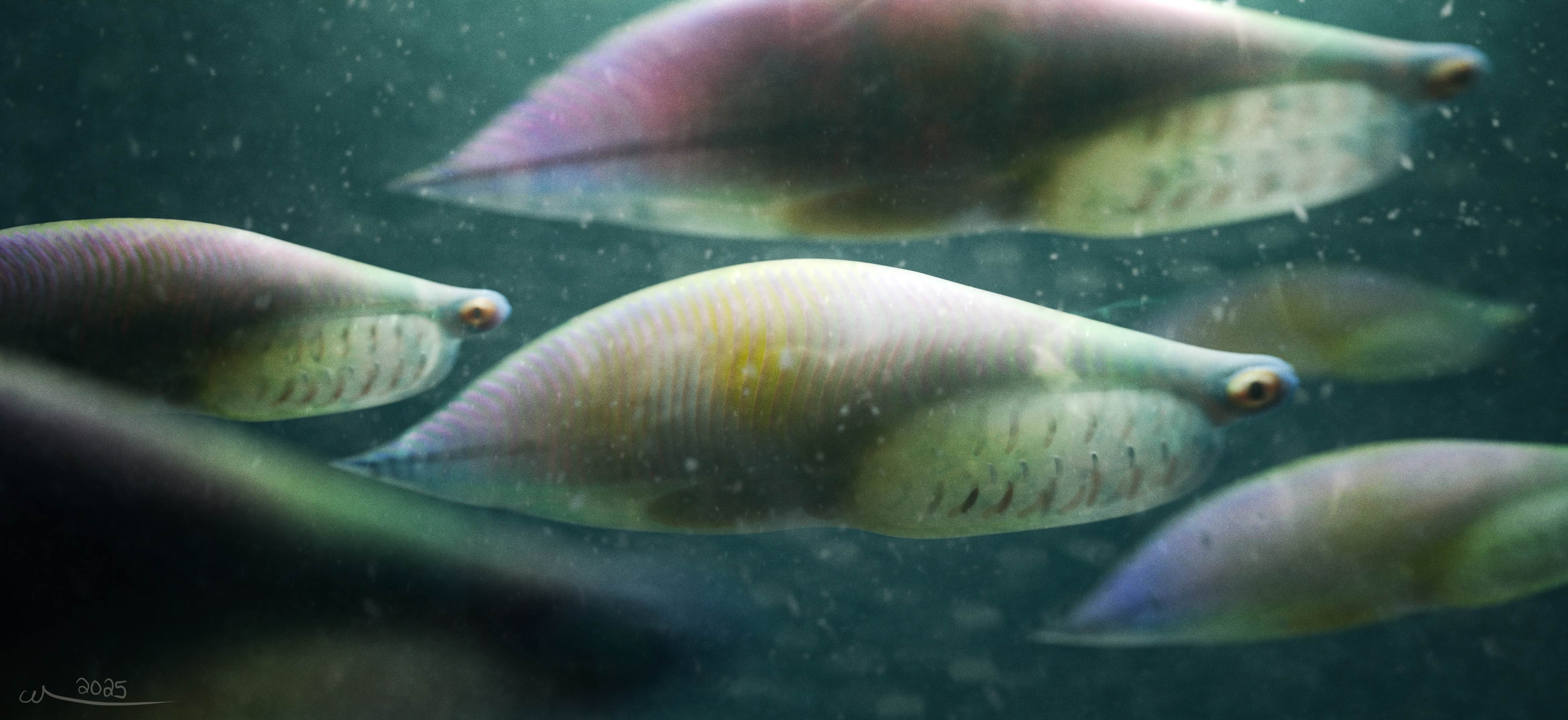
- Life restoration of Emmonsaspis
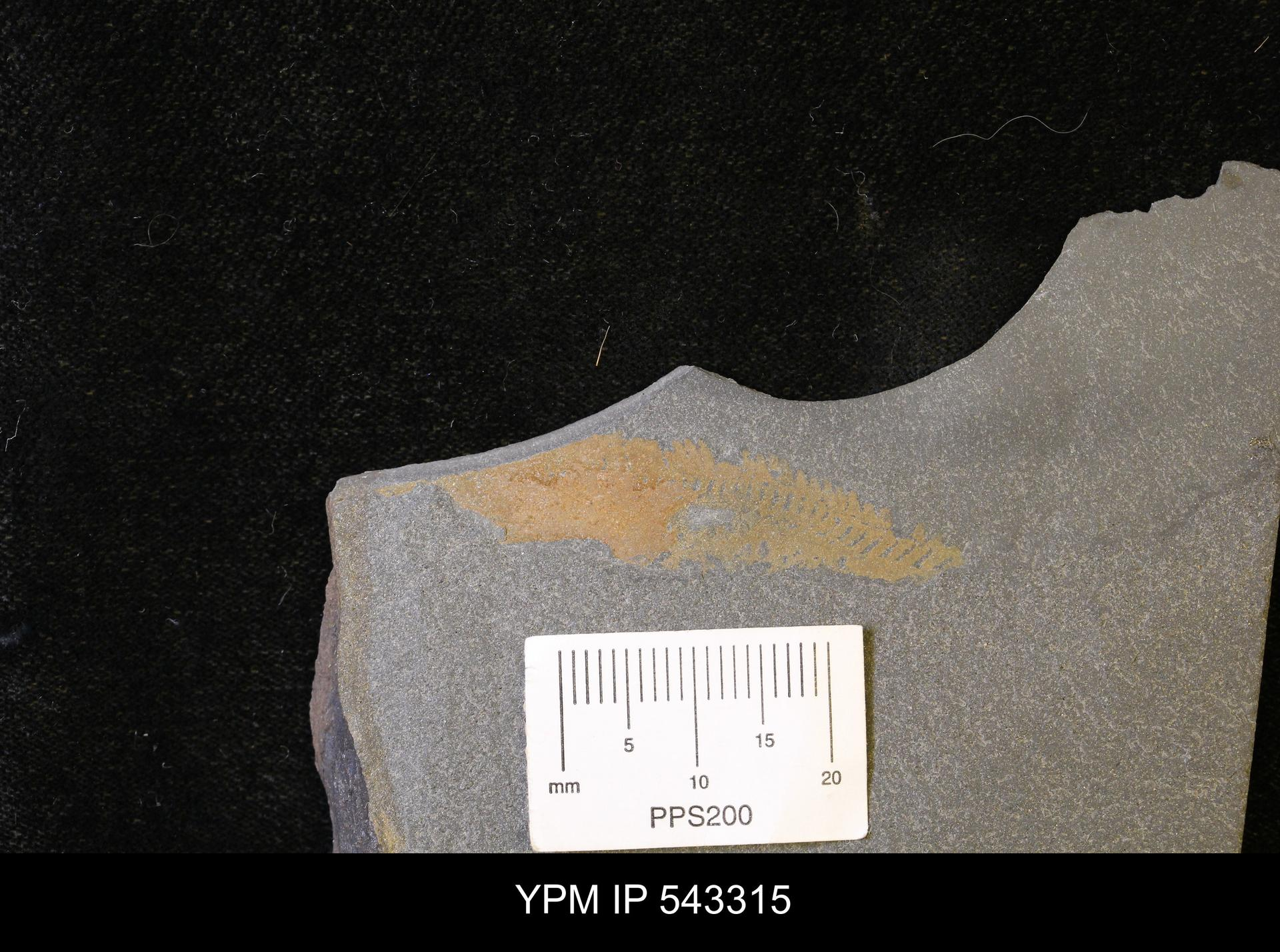
- Fossil of Emmonsaspis

Scientific classification
- Kingdom: Animalia
- Phylum: Chordata
- Genus: †Emmonsaspis; Resser & Howell, 1938

Species
- Emmonaspis worthanella Resser & Howell, 1938; Emmonsaspis cambrensis (Walcott, 1891)

= Emmonsaspis =

Emmonsaspis Temporal range: Cambrian Stage 4

Extinct genus of Cambrian organisms

Emmonsaspis is an extinct genus of chordate of likely vertebrate affinity, and its fossils were found in the Cambrian-age Parker Slate of Vermont in the late 19th century.

== Description ==
Size of Emmonsaspis (red) compared to other Cambrian chordates and a human hand

Emmonsaspis is a chordate related to Metaspriggina and Nuucichthys. It grew to at least 4.5 cm (1.8 in) in length, and probably was a filter feeder on small particles and animals in the water column. No trace of a spinal cord is present, although roughly 50 myomeres (muscle blocks) can be seen in the fossils. It had large eyes and a large organ behind its branchial chamber, probably a liver.

There are two species: Emmonaspis worthanella and Emmonaspis cambriensis (Walcott(?) 1886(?) 1911(?)).

E. cambrensis has been described as a graptolite, a chordate, an arthropod and as a frond-like organism, though recent studies have interpreted it as a chordate.

== Phylogeny ==
It was interpreted by paleontologist C. D. Walcott in 1911 as a polychaete worm. Although some paleontologists regarded it as an early chordate allied with Pikaia et al., Conway Morris suggested in 1993 that it might be a Cambrian descendant of the Vendian form Pteridinium, and a frondose morphology was accepted, until a 2024 study found Emmonsaspis to be in a polytomy with Metaspriggina and Nuucichthys as a stem-group vertebrate.

Cladogram following Lerosey-Aubril and Ortega-Hernández 2024 (note that the finding of a closer relationship between cephalochordates and tunicates than either is to vertebrates is contradicted by genetic evidence)

- Chordata
  - - †Vetulicolia
    - - Cephalochordata
      - Tunicata
  - Vertebrata total group
    - †Pikaia
    - - †Yunnanozoon
      - - †Myllokunmingiidae
        - - †Nuucichthys
          - †Metaspriggina
          - †Emmonsaspis
          - - †Conodonta
            - Crown group Vertebrata
