= Swasey Limestone =

Geologic formation in Utah

- Stratigraphic range: Cambrian
- Type: Formation

Location
- Region: Utah
- Country: United States

The Swasey Limestone is a geologic formation in Utah that preserves fossils dating back to the Cambrian period.

== See also ==
- List of fossiliferous stratigraphic units in Utah
- Paleontology in Utah
