= Leda Clay Formation =

Canadian geologic formation

- Type: Formation

Location
- Region: New Brunswick
- Country: Canada

The Leda Clay Formation is a geologic formation in New Brunswick. It preserves fossils.

== See also ==
- List of fossiliferous stratigraphic units in New Brunswick
