= Fundy Basin =

Sediment-filled rift basin on the Atlantic coast of southeastern Canada

Coordinates: 45°8′N 65°35′W

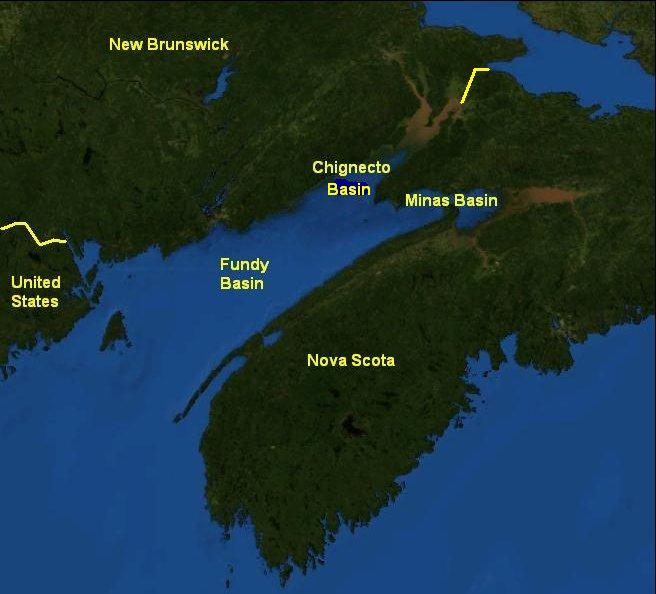
Map of the Maritimes area, including the Fundy Basin

Basal contact of a lava flow section of Fundy Basin

The Fundy Basin is a sediment-filled rift basin on the Atlantic coast of southeastern Canada. It contains three sub-basins; the Fundy sub-basin, the Minas Basin and the Chignecto Basin. These arms meet at the Bay of Fundy, which is contained within the rift valley. From the Bay of Fundy, the Minas Basin trends northeast to Nova Scotia. Chignecto Bay runs from the Bay of Fundy northwest between New Brunswick and Nova Scotia which is separated from the waters of the Northumberland Strait by the Isthmus of Chignecto. The Fundy Basin is best known for the bay it contains. The Bay of Fundy is home to huge tidal changes and tidal bores. It is part of the system of Eastern North America Rift Basins.

Approximately 220 million years ago, during the late Triassic period, the supercontinent Pangaea began to break apart. The focus of the rifting began somewhere between where present-day eastern North America and north-western Africa were joined.

As the rift began to separate from mainland North America, volcanic activity occurred, forming volcanoes and flood basalts. These flood basalts poured out over the landscape, covering much of southern Nova Scotia. Sections of the flood basalts have been eroded away, but still form a basaltic mountain range known as North Mountain. The rift valley eventually failed (see aulacogen) as the Mid-Atlantic Ridge continued to separate North America, Europe, and Africa.

As in all rifting environments, grabens formed. Many of these grabens were created, but for some of them, extension stopped before full rifting occurred. Where only partial rifting occurred, basins formed. By definition, a basin is any area that collects sediments. These "aborted rifts" (rifts that are tectonically inactive and no longer collecting sediments) extend from Alabama to Newfoundland.

Along certain basins, rifting was not partial. Where full rifting occurred, the Atlantic Ocean was created. Along these rifts, magmatic activity never stopped, as shown by the ongoing eruption of lava along the Mid-Atlantic Ridge.

The Fundy Basin is one in a series of these failed rifts. During its rupture, tholeiitic basaltic lava erupted, producing a sequence of continental tholeiitic basalts. These tholeiitic basalts form a volcanic ridge known as North Mountain.

== See also ==
- Volcanism of Canada
- Volcanism of Eastern Canada
- Geography of New Brunswick
- Geography of Nova Scotia
