= Northern Appalachians seismic zone =

Coordinates: 45°N 70°W

The Northern Appalachians seismic zone is an active seismic zone in the Appalachian Mountains of eastern North America, extending from New Brunswick southwards into New England and Boston. Both the seismic zone and the resultant Appalachian Mountains were created by the collision of two tectonic plates about 440–480 million years ago during the middle Ordovician Period.
