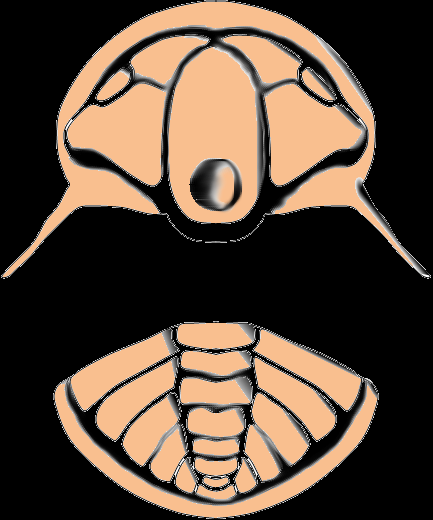
- A drawing of a Tchernyshevioides ninae, based on specimens from Tian-Shan (Sulyukta region) Siberia

Scientific classification
- Domain: Eukaryota
- Kingdom: Animalia
- Phylum: Arthropoda
- Class: †Trilobita (?)
- Order: †Agnostida
- Family: †Hebediscidae
- Genus: †Tchernyshevioides; Hajrullina 1975

Species
- T. ninae Hajrullina 1975 (type)

= Tchernyshevioides =

Tchernyshevioides Temporal range: Middle Cambrian

Genus of trilobite

Tchernyshevioides is a diminutive trilobite that lived during the early Middle Cambrian (Amgaian) and has been found in the Russian Federation (Pseudanomocarina-zone, Sulyukta region, Tian-Shan) and the Jbel Wawrmast Formation of Morocco.

== Etymology ==
Tchernyshevioides has been named in honor of the Russian paleontologist N.E. Tchernysheva.

== Description ==
The central raised area (or glabella) of the headshield (or cephalon) is long and reaches the anterior border furrow. The occipital ring is well defined and carries a long posterdorsal spine. Otherwise the glabella has no transverse furrows. The border furrow is distinct and the border wide. The free cheeks (or librigenae) are very short. The cephalic angle carries a slender spine of almost equal length as the glabella, directed backwards and outwards at about 45°. The thorax is unknown. Pygidium with axis of six rings plus terminus. There are five well defined pleural furrows and the border is narrow and smooth.
