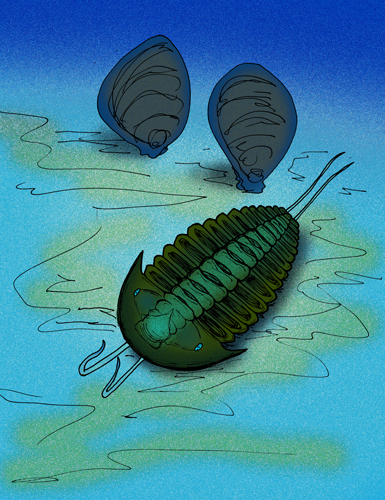
- Restoration of V. judomica

Scientific classification
- Domain: Eukaryota
- Kingdom: Animalia
- Phylum: Arthropoda
- Class: †Trilobita
- Order: †Ptychopariida
- Family: †Palaeolenidae
- Genus: †Validaspis; Repina, 1977

= Validaspis =

Validaspis Temporal range: Early Botomian

Validaspis is an extinct genus of ptychopariid trilobite from the superfamily Ellipsocephaloidea. It lived during the early part of the Botomian stage of the early Cambrian. Fossils of V. judomica are found in the upper portion of the Petrotsvet Formation in the Siberian Platform.
