= Back Bay Formation =

Geologic formation in New Brunswick, Canada

- Stratigraphic range: Silurian
- Type: Formation

Location
- Region: New Brunswick
- Country: Canada

The Back Bay Formation is a geologic formation in New Brunswick. It preserves fossils dating back to the Silurian period.

== See also ==
- List of fossiliferous stratigraphic units in New Brunswick
