= La Garde Formation =

Geologic formation in New Brunswick, Canada

- Stratigraphic range: Devonian
- Type: Formation

Location
- Region: New Brunswick
- Country: Canada

The La Garde Formation is a geologic formation in New Brunswick. It preserves fossils dating back to the Devonian period.

== See also ==
- List of fossiliferous stratigraphic units in New Brunswick
