= Duchesnay Formation =

Geologic formation in British Columbia, Canada

- Stratigraphic range: Drumian?
- Type: Formation
- Unit of: Chancellor Group

Location
- Region: British Columbia
- Country: Canada

The Duchesnay Formation is a geologic formation in British Columbia. It preserves fossils dating back to the Cambrian period. It preserves a Burgess Shale-type lagerstätte, and is indeed part of the same wider group as the Burgess Shale itself, although the amounts of soft-bodied organisms are somewhat lower. It is also quite similar to the Burgess Shale in being deposited along an escarpment, in this case the Eldon Escarpment. The soft-bodied biota preserved includes Isoxys, an eldonioid, a polychaete, a hemichordate, vendotaenids and Naraoia, alongside possible specimens of Habelia, Ottoia and Canadaspis in addition to several problematic taxa.

== See also ==
- List of fossiliferous stratigraphic units in British Columbia
