= Dalhousie Group =

- Stratigraphic range: Devonian
- Type: Group

Location
- Region: New Brunswick
- Country: Canada

The Dalhousie Group is a geologic group in New Brunswick. It preserves fossils dating back to the Devonian period.

== See also ==
- List of fossiliferous stratigraphic units in New Brunswick
