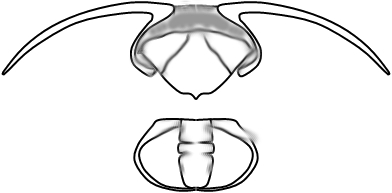
- A drawing of a cephalon of Dicerodiscus tsunyiensis, and a pygidium of D. pertenus

Scientific classification
- Domain: Eukaryota
- Kingdom: Animalia
- Phylum: Arthropoda
- Class: †Trilobita (?)
- Order: †Agnostida
- Family: †Hebediscidae
- Genus: †Dicerodiscus; W. Chang, 1964

Species
- D. tsunyiensis W. Chang, 1964 (type); D. alcimus Qian et S. G. Zhang, 1980; D. pertenus Qian et S. G. Zhang, 1980; D. transversus Qian et S. G. Zhang, 1980

= Dicerodiscus =

Dicerodiscus Temporal range: Early Botomian (Olenellus-zone)

Extinct genus of trilobites

Dicerodiscus is an extinct genus from a well-known class of fossil marine arthropods, the trilobites. It lived during the early part of the Botomian stage, in China (Guizhou and Sichuan). Four species have been assigned to it. Dicerodiscus is unique for an eodiscoid in having conspicuous and curved spines that are attached anteriorly, and at their base are directed outward perpendicular to the midline, before gradually bending further backwards.

== Distribution ==
- D. tsunyiensis is known from the Lower Cambrian of China (Canglangpuan, Guizhou).
- D. pertenus has been found in the Lower Cambrian (Qiongzhusian, Sichuan).

== Description ==
Like all Agnostida, Dicerodiscus is diminutive and the headshield (or cephalon) and tailshield (or pygidium) are of approximately the same size (or isopygous) and outline. The central raised area of the cephalon (or glabella) is conical and without transverse furrows. The most backward part of the glabella (called occipital ring or LO) usually carries small spine. The cephalon carries a pair of long, anteriorly fixed spines, running sideways from frontal border before curving gradually backwards. The border between spines is long (in the direction of the midline), but backwards from the spines. There are no facial sutures. The eyelobe is indistinct on lateral part of cheek elevation. The thorax has not been found. The pygidium is convex. Its axis is parallel-sided, and does not reach border furrow. Three pairs of pleural furrows may be discernible. The pygidial border is narrow.
