= Mural Formation =

Geologic formation in Alberta, Canada

- Stratigraphic range: Cambrian
- Type: Formation

Location
- Region: Alberta
- Country: Canada

The Mural Formation is a geologic formation in Alberta. It preserves fossils dating back to the Cambrian period.

== See also ==
- List of fossiliferous stratigraphic units in Alberta
