= Parapagetia =

Parapagetia Temporal range: Botomian

Scientific classification
- Domain: Eukaryota
- Kingdom: Animalia
- Phylum: Arthropoda
- Class: †Trilobita (?)
- Order: †Agnostida
- Family: †Hebediscidae
- Genus: †Parapagetia; Repina, 1964

Species
- P. limbata Repina, 1964 (type); P. icatunica Repina, 1964; P. palaeformis Romanenko & Romanenko, 1967; P. plana E. Romanenko, 1978

Extinct genus of trilobites

Parapagetia is an extinct genus from a well-known class of fossil marine arthropods, the trilobites. It lived during the Botomian stage, which lasted from approximately 524 to 518.5 million years ago. This faunal stage was part of the Cambrian Period.

== Distribution ==
- P. limbata is known from the Lower Cambrian of the Russian Federation (Botomian, Sanashtykgol, Gorno-Altayskaya, Katun River).
- P. plana has been found in the Lower Cambrian of the Russian Federation (Botomian, Sanashtykgol, Gorno-Altayskaya, Ul’men’River).

== Description ==
Like all Agnostida, the Hebediscidae are diminutive and the headshield (or cephalon) and tailshield (or pygidium) are of approximately the same size (or isopygous) and outline. In Parapagetia the glabella has parallel sides and is relatively short, slightly over half as long as the cephalon. The rear of the glabella does not carry a spine or it is short. The distance between the front of the glabella and the poorly defined anterior border is long. The axis of the pygidium consists of five rings including the terminus. The border and border furrow are together wide, but poorly defined.
