= Trempealeau Formation =

Geologic formation in Wisconsin, US

- Stratigraphic range: Upper Cambrian
- Type: Formation

Lithology
- Primary: Dolomite

Location
- Region: Wisconsin
- Country: United States

The Trempealeau Formation is an Upper Cambrian geologic formation in Wisconsin. It contains graptolites.

== See also ==
- List of fossiliferous stratigraphic units in Wisconsin
- Paleontology in Wisconsin
