= Chignecto Basin =

Basin between New Brunswick and Nova Scotia in Canada

Coordinates: 45°37′24.3″N 64°38′33.4″W

Chignecto Basin

The Chignecto Basin is a basin between New Brunswick and Nova Scotia of southeastern Canada. It is a sub-basin of the Fundy Basin.
