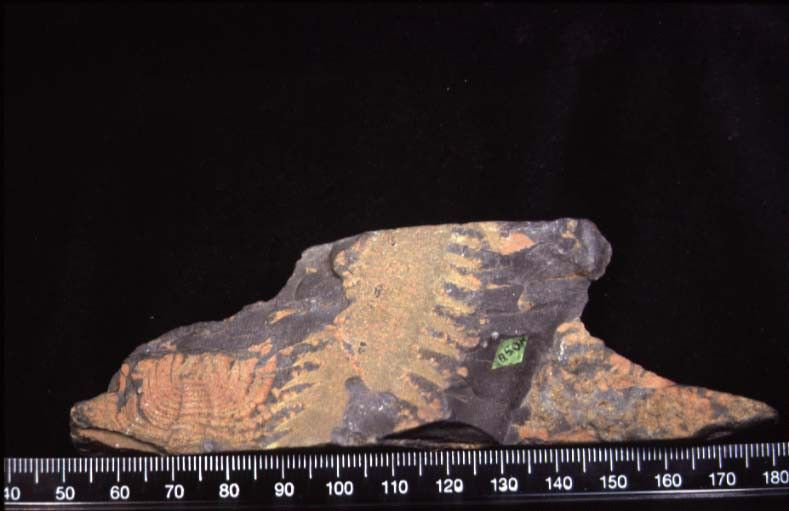
- The holotype of Serracaris, a fragmentary fossil

Scientific classification
- Domain: Eukaryota
- Kingdom: Animalia
- Phylum: Arthropoda
- Class: incertae sedis
- Genus: †Serracaris; Briggs, 1978
- Species: †S. lineata

Binomial name
- †Serracaris lineata (Resser and Howell, 1938)

Synonyms
- Anomalocaris lineata Resser and Howell, 1938

= Serracaris =

Serracaris Temporal range: Cambrian Stage 4

Extinct genus of arthropods

Serracaris is a genus of enigmatic arthropod from the Kinzers Formation of Pennsylvania. It contains one species, Serracaris lineata. This genus was formerly classed within Anomalocaris, however once it was realised Serracaris was in fact the trunk of an arthropod it was reassigned.

The generic name derives from serra (“saw”) in reference to the serrated edges of its body, and caris (“shrimp”), a common suffix for prehistoric arthropod names. The specific name lineata likely derives from the straighter nature of the fossil compared to other Anomalocaris appendages.

== Description ==
Serracaris is only known from the trunk, and even though a front margin is preserved in one specimen this is likely not a cephalon (furthermore, the region’s details are obscured by a dark stain). The exoskeleton is composed of smooth, flat sub-rectangular (rectangular with rounded edges) tergites, with gently anteriorly curved boundaries between them. The lateral margins of each extend into two long pointed backwards-curving paratergal folds, each overlapping with the other on their tergite. While exact dorsoventral (up/down) position is unclear, the backwards fold was likely under the forwards one. These folds are connected to the main tergite by a ridge, with an asymmetrical specimen suggesting they may have been able to articulate (move) along the dorsoventral axis. One much longer tergite bears especially large paratergal folds, reaching the length of around two tergites. Towards the (unpreserved) head, the segments seem to have become shorter except for this one specifically, with 12 before and at least 3 after it with a total number over around 15 segments. A specimen which is poorly preserved suggests even more, with at least 22 segments along its whole body. The telson is long, lacks an axial (middle) region and bears two long spines at its side. Unlike the folds, these spines seem to not have articulated, being separated along the midline by a small round structure with a convex tip (which may have contained the anus). The telson also seems to have had a series of small projections on its anterior edge. The exact size range of Serracaris is uncertain due to its fragmentary nature, as although the most complete specimen measures around 9 cm in its preserved portion its telson is only half the size of a different, isolated specimen.

== Affinity ==
All fossils of Serracaris lack appendages and the head, making classification problematic. It is certainly an arthropod, however the nature of the tergites rules out Chelicerata and most crustaceans. Branchiopoda has similar tergites, however they lack paratergal folds, hence it is not a branchiopod either. It superficially resembles Myriapoda, especially the Archipolypoda, however the lack of prozonite/metazonite division, the articulating spines and the telson are uncharacteristic of the clade. Serracaris closest resembles the trilobites in characteristics, but even this does not match exactly. The articulating spines yet again are at odds with a trilobite affinity, alongside seeming double pleurae. Furthermore, Serracaris is longer than the vast majority of trilobites, even the “exceptionally long and narrow” Opipeuterella. Without the head, its affinities are uncertain, however it being the body of a bivalved arthropod like the Kinzers Tuzoia was proposed.

The more recently described Dytikosicula, another enigmatic arthropod (although possibly a megacheiran), also resembles Serracaris. However, it still bears several differences. For example, Serracaris has double paratergal folds, alongside a large segment near the anterior. The anterior margin on one Serracaris specimen actually resembles the head shield of Dytikosicula, although it is larger and possibly wider in the former. Furthermore, Serracaris is also somewhat older than Dytikosicula (however, a more spiny form similar to both known from the Eldon Formation was identified as a possible Serracaris fossil).

== Paleobiology ==
Serracaris was very likely pelagic, as evidenced by a long streamlined body, a smooth and unmineralised exoskeleton, alongside its paratergal folds being quite small. The articulation in the folds may have helped to orient and stabilise the animal while swimming, meanwhile the many spines may have deterred predators. The lack of an axis suggests it likely could not enroll.
