= Dytikosicula =

Dytikosicula Temporal range: Middle Cambrian

Scientific classification
- Kingdom: Animalia
- Phylum: Arthropoda
- Class: incertae sedis
- Genus: †Dytikosicula; Conway Morris et al, 2015
- Species: †D. desmatae

Binomial name
- †Dytikosicula desmatae Conway Morris et al, 2015

Extinct genus of possible megacheiran

Dytikosicula is a genus of Cambrian arthropod from the Marjum Formation of Utah. It contains one species, Dytikosicula desmatae. The taxon may be synonymous with Dicranocaris, however this is uncertain.

== Description ==
Dytikosicula's affinity is unclear, although it may be allied with the megacheirans like its apparent relative Dicranocaris. Unusually its head is not preserved aside from a head shield, meaning the possible "great appendages" common to megacheirans cannot be seen. In addition, no appendages of any kind are preserved, further complicating matters. Dytikosicula differs from Dicranocaris by having a pleural extension on its first trunk segment, alongside a somewhat more circular head. The two also differ due to the latter being conspicuously larger. Due to this, material formerly assigned to Dicranocaris from the Wheeler Formation may belong to this genus instead. These specimens, despite being poorly preserved, may show evidence of a pleuron on the first trunk segment. This genus also shares similarities with Serracaris from the Kinzers Formation, namely an elongate trunk with large pleurae. However, in Serracaris these tergal extensions seem to be doubled, alongside a posterior segment having relatively larger extensions.

== Etymology ==
Dytikosicula derives from the Greek word for west, dytikos, and the word for a small dagger, sicula, in combined reference to the geological area where the fossils are from and the recurved paratergal extensions. The species name, desmatae, derives from the Greek word desmos meaning "chain", in reference to its proposed link to other Cambrian megacheirans.
