= St. John Group =

Geologic group in New Brunswick, Canada

- Stratigraphic range: Cambrian
- Type: Group

Location
- Region: New Brunswick
- Country: Canada

The St. John Group is a geologic group in New Brunswick. It preserves fossils dating back to the Cambrian period.

== See also ==
- List of fossiliferous stratigraphic units in New Brunswick
