= Acrocephalella =

Acrocephalella Temporal range: Guzhangian–Paibian

Scientific classification
- Kingdom: Animalia
- Phylum: Arthropoda
- Clade: †Artiopoda
- Class: †Trilobita
- Order: †Ptychopariida
- Family: †Acrocephalitidae
- Genus: †Acrocephalella; Rozova, 1963

Species
- Acrocephalella granulosa Rozova, 1963 (type)

Acrocephalella is an extinct genus from a well-known class of fossil marine arthropods, the trilobites. It lived from 501 to 497 million years ago during the Guzhangian of the late Cambrian Period.

== Distribution ==
Acrocephalella granulosa is present in the Cambrian of the Russian Federation (Nganasany Member, Kulyumbe Formation, Kulyumbe River, Krasnoyar, 68.0°N - 88.8°E).
