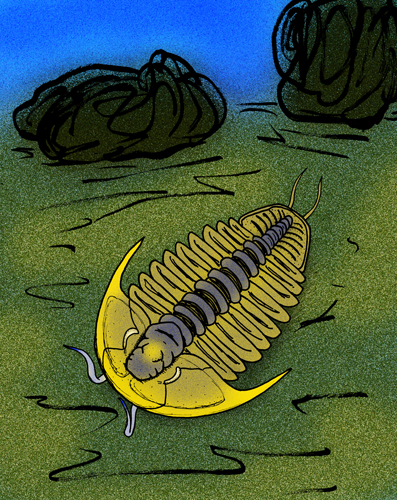
- Restoration of Quitacetra arenata

Scientific classification
- Kingdom: Animalia
- Phylum: Arthropoda
- Clade: †Artiopoda
- Class: †Trilobita
- Order: †Ptychopariida
- Family: †Mapaniidae
- Genus: †Quitacetra; Öpik, 1967

= Quitacetra =

Quitacetra Temporal range: Late Cambrian

Extinct genus of trilobites

Quitacetra arenata is a species of ptychopariid trilobite arthropod from Late Cambrian-aged deposits in Quita Creek, Queensland.
