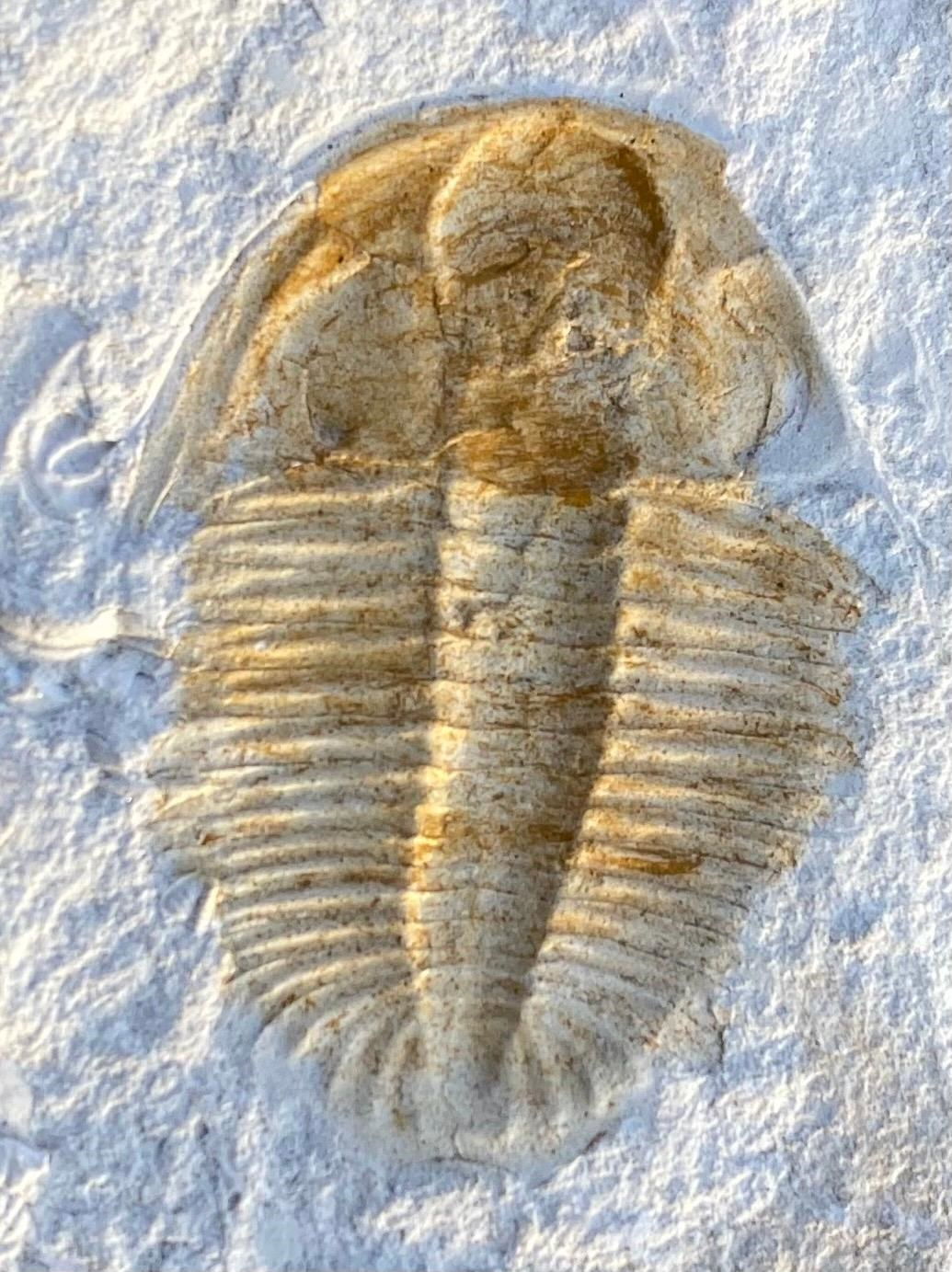
- Xystridura templetonensis (Chapman, 1929). Middle Cambrian (early Templetonian), Beetle Creek Formation, Beetle Creek, Mount Isa, Queensland, Australia. Length of exoskeleton = 28 mm (sag.)

Scientific classification
- Kingdom: Animalia
- Phylum: Arthropoda
- Clade: †Artiopoda
- Class: †Trilobita
- Order: †Redlichiida
- Family: †Xystriduridae
- Genus: †Xystridura; Whitehouse, 1936

Synonyms
- Milesia Chapman, 1929 (non Latreille, 1804); Inosacotes Öpik, 1975; Polydinotes Öpik, 1975,

= Xystridura =

Xystridura Temporal range: Middle Cambrian

Extinct genus of trilobites

Xystridura is a genus of redlichiid trilobite described originally from the Middle Cambrian (Miaolingian) strata of Queensland, Australia. The genus ranges upwards from Ordian into Florian Stages in terms of Australian Cambrian stratigraphic nomenclature.

== Type species ==
Milesia templetonensis Chapman, 1929, p. 214. [synonymized with Bathyuriscus saint-smithi Chapman, 1929, p. 209, by Whitehouse, 1939, p. 199] - see Palmer and Gatehouse (1972, p. D13). Also = X. conspicabilis (Chapman, 1929), X. elegans (Chapman, 1929), X. nitida (Chapman, 1929) and X. olenelloides (Chapman, 1929) [fide Whitehouse (1939), Öpik (1975)], all Middle Cambrian, Queensland (Edgecombe, 2004).

=== Other species ===
- Xystridura glacia Palmer and Gatehouse, 1972. Xystridura glacia faunule (early Middle Cambrian), boulder from moraine, Mount Spann, NE Argentina Range, Antarctica.
- Xystridura multilinia Palmer and Gatehouse, 1972. Xystridura multilinia faunule (early Middle Cambrian), boulder from moraine, Mount Spann, NE Argentina Range, Antarctica.
- Xystridura filifera Öpik, 1975. [= Xystridura verticosa Öpik, 1975 & X. triligata Öpik, 1975].
- Xystridura altera Öpik, 1979. From Northern Territory Geological Survey Diamond Drill Hole Elkedra No. 3., southwestern Georgina Basin, Northern Territory. Middle Cambrian, Arthur Creek Formation, Xystridura altera assemblage and probably equating to part of the Triplagnostus gibbus Biozone in terms of Scandinavian biostratigraphic terminology (Laurie, 2004, p. 225).
- Xystridura oepiki Laurie, 2006 (p. 192, figs. 62 - 64). From the Arthur Creek Formation, Florian Stage (Laurie, 2012, p.3). Pacific Oil & Gas Baldwin 1 well, southern Georgina Basin, Northern Territory.
- Xystridura jielingensis Yang et al., 1993. Type locality is Gaoqiaogou, bed 46, which is in a Taijangian/Wangcunian slope lime mudstone in the Baguamiao Formation of China.

Many other species of Xystridura described by Chapman (1929) and Öpik (1975) were listed by Edgecombe (2004).
