= Rockslide Formation =

- Stratigraphic range: Drumian
- Type: Formation

Location
- Region: Northwest Territories
- Country: Canada

The Rockslide Formation is a geologic formation in Northwest Territories. It preserves fossils dating back to the Drumian (Plagiura-Pogiella to Bolaspidella Zone).

It was deposited in deep water on a reasonably distal slope; it contains carbonates, debris flows and siliciclastic siltstones, the latter being the fossil bearing horizons. It also contains deep-water microbial reefs.

== See also ==
- List of fossiliferous stratigraphic units in Northwest Territories
