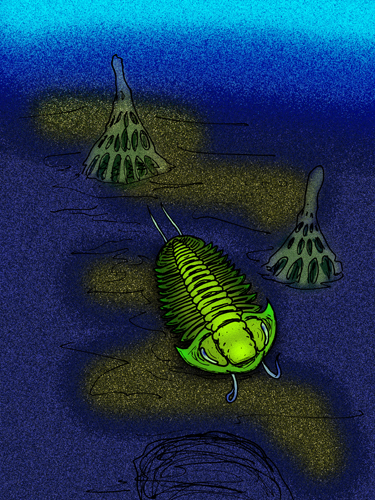

Scientific classification
- Kingdom: Animalia
- Phylum: Arthropoda
- Clade: †Artiopoda
- Class: †Trilobita
- Order: †Ptychopariida
- Family: †Chengkouiidae
- Genus: †Xiuqiella; Chien & Yao, 1974
- Species: †X. rectangula

Binomial name
- †Xiuqiella rectangula Chien & Yao, 1974

= Xiuqiella =

Xiuqiella Temporal range: Nangaoian

Extinct corynexochid trilobites

Xiuqiella rectangula is a trilobite that lived in what is now Chongqing, China during the Nangaoian stage of the Cambrian Period, near the end of Cambrian Stage 3, which lasted from approximately 516 to 513 million years ago.
