= Asbill Pond Formation =

Geologic formation in South Carolina

- Stratigraphic range: Cambrian
- Type: Formation

Location
- Region: South Carolina
- Country: United States

The Asbill Pond Formation is a geologic formation in South Carolina. It preserves fossils dating back to the Cambrian period.

== See also ==
- List of fossiliferous stratigraphic units in South Carolina
- Paleontology in South Carolina
