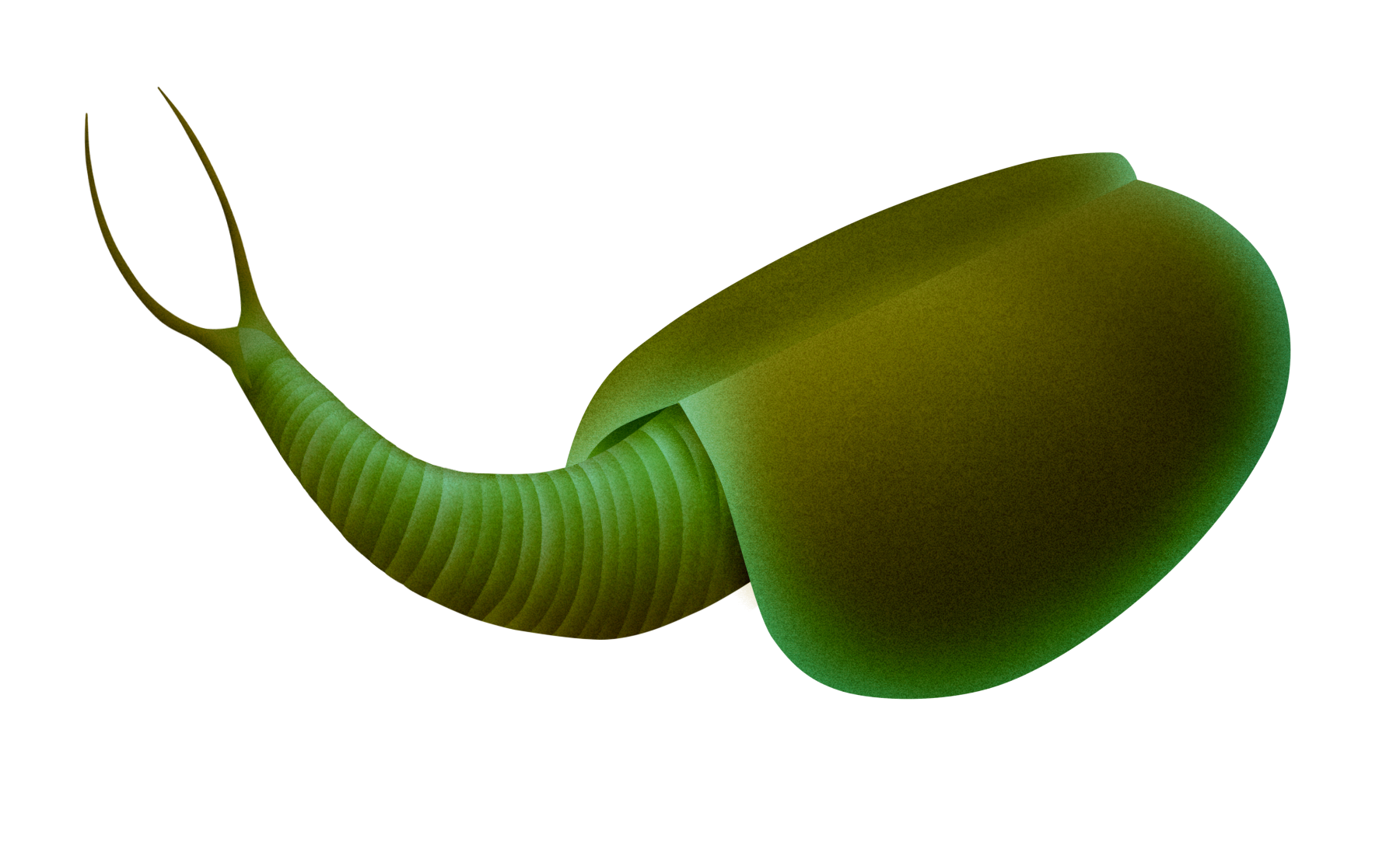
- Protocaris marshi
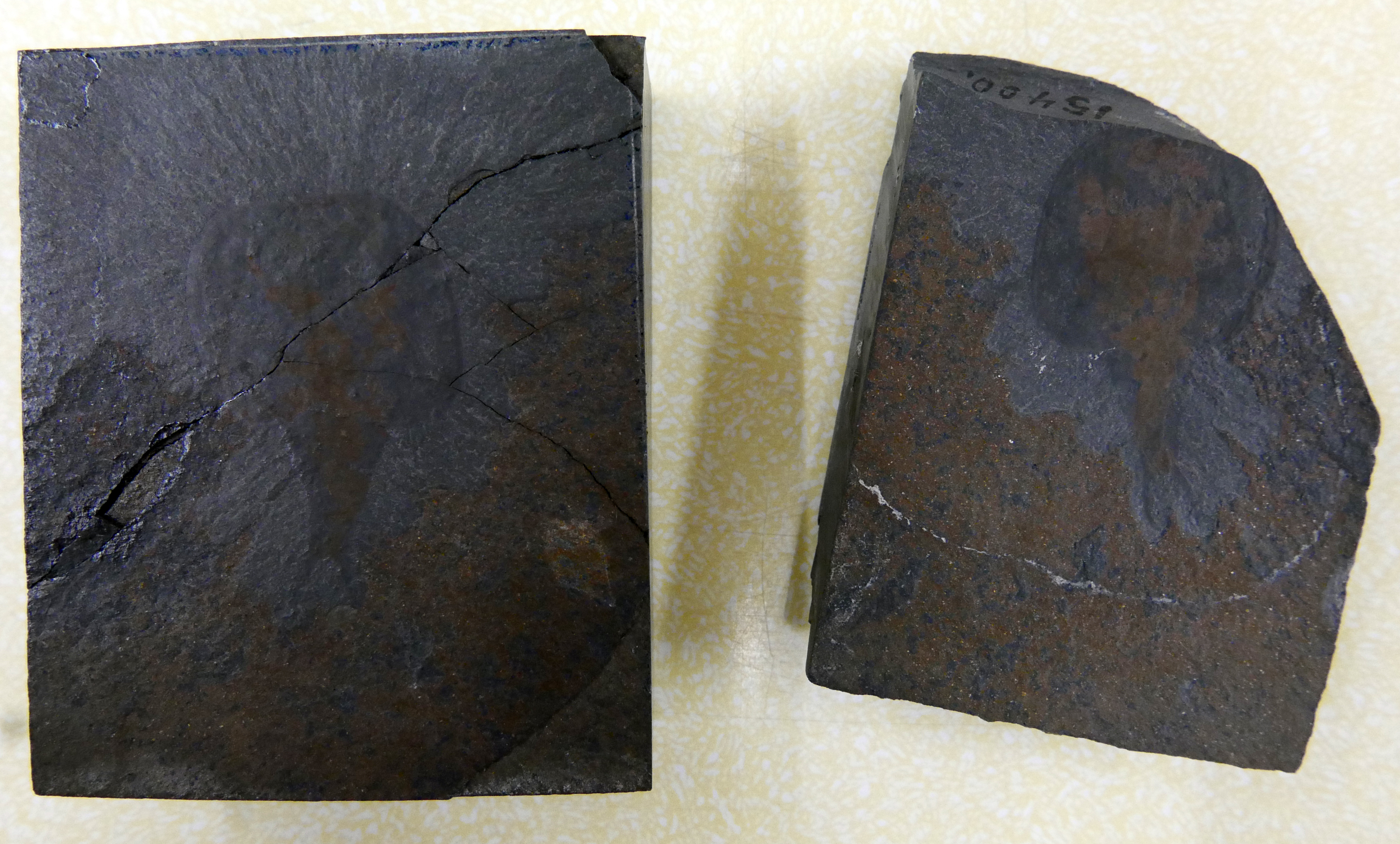
- Holotype specimen

Scientific classification
- Kingdom: Animalia
- Phylum: Arthropoda
- Order: †Hymenocarina
- Family: †Protocarididae
- Genus: †Protocaris; Walcott, 1884
- Species: †P. marshi

Binomial name
- †Protocaris marshi Walcott, 1884

= Protocaris =

Protocaris Temporal range: Cambrian Series 2

Genus of Cambrian arthropods

Protocaris marshi is an extinct species of bivalved arthropod known from a single specimen collected from the Cambrian Series 2 aged Parker Formation from the Parker Quarry of northwestern Vermont, United States. The specimen is preserved in top-down view and has a bivalved carapace, a segmented trunk and a forked tail. Its precise taxonomic position is uncertain, due to the limited nature of known remains, but it is suggested to be a member of Hymenocarina belonging to the family Protocarididae, which also includes Tokummia and Branchiocaris.
