= Weeks Formation =

Geologic formation in Utah, United States

- Stratigraphic range: Guzhangian
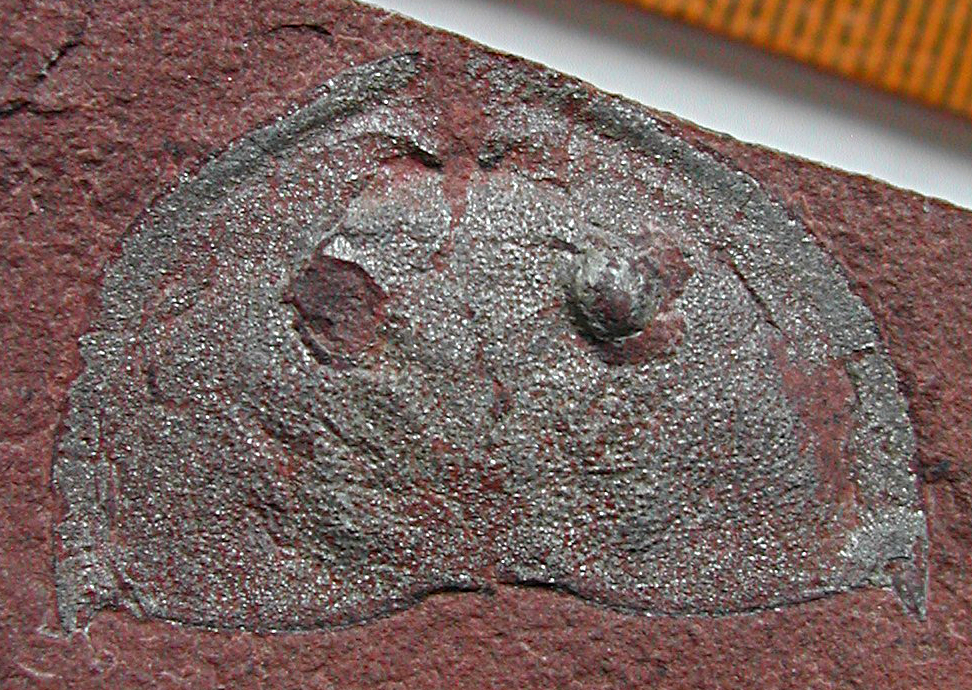
- Fossil from the Weeks Formation
- Type: Formation

Location
- Region: Utah
- Country: United States

The Weeks Formation is a geologic formation in Utah. It preserves fossils dating back to the Cambrian period and more specifically the Guzhangian stage. Its upper part has yielded a diverse fauna dominated by trilobites and brachiopods, but also comprising various soft-bodied organisms, such as Falcatamacaris. As such, it is regarded as a Konservat-Lagerstätte.

== See also ==
- List of fossiliferous stratigraphic units in Utah
- Paleontology in Utah
