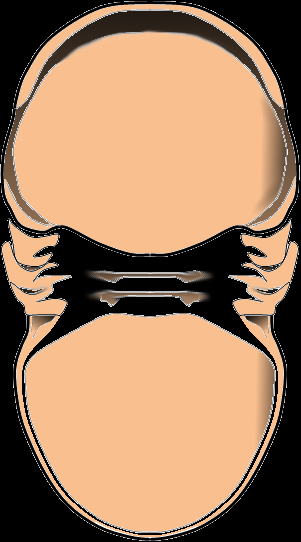
- A drawing of Delgadella lenaicus, Lena River, Yakutia

Scientific classification
- Kingdom: Animalia
- Phylum: Arthropoda
- Clade: †Artiopoda
- Class: †Trilobita (?)
- Order: †Agnostida
- Family: †Hebediscidae
- Genus: †Delgadella; Walcott, 1908

Species
- D. lusitanica (Delgado, 1904) (type species) = Lingulepis lusitanica; D. caudatus (Delgado, 1904) = Delgadodiscus caudatus, Microdiscus caudatus; D. lenaicus (Toll, 1899) = Microdiscus lenaicus

Synonyms
- Alemtejoia, Delgadodiscus, Delgadoia, Pagetiellus, Pentagonalia

= Delgadella =

Delgadella Temporal range: Late Atdabanian to Botomian

Delgadella is a diminutive agnostid that lived during the late Lower Cambrian (Atdabanian to Botomian, over 500 million years ago) and has been found in Russia (Siberian Platform, Altay Mountains), Mongolia, Spain, Italy (Sardinia), Portugal, Morocco and Canada (Newfoundland). It can be recognized by its strongly effaced headshield and tailshield, with narrow but distinct furrows and borders along its margins, and three thorax segments.

== Description ==
The headshield (or cephalon) is convex, and axial furrow that surrounds the central area (or glabella) almost obsolete, particularly on the external surface. The glabella has no transverse furrows. The border furrow is distinct and wide anteriorly, and the border distinct and narrow. The eye lobe (or palpebral lobe) is poorly defined. The free cheeks (or librigenae) are long. The thorax has three segments. The tailshield (or pygidium) has a long axis of 10 almost indiscernible rings. The furrow that defines the axis in the pygidium (or rhachis) is almost obsolete. The area outside the rhachis (or pleural zone) is usually smooth, and like on the cephalon, the border and border furrow are very narrow but distinct.

== Distribution ==
- Delgadella occurs in the Lower Cambrian of the Russian Federation (Atdabanian, Judomia trilobite-zone, Tyuser Formation, Chekurovka village, Biskeebit River mouth near Lena River 71.0° N, 127.5° E, Erkeket Formation, Mattaiya Creek, 71.5° N, 124.6° E, Bergeroniellus gurarii trilobite-zone, Sinsk Formation, Algal Lens Yakutia, 61.1° N, 126.6°; Botomian, Lapworthella bella small shelly-zone, Krasnoporog Formation, Sukharikha River, Krasnoyarskiy Kray, 67.2° N, 87.0° E), and Spain (Atdabanian, upper part of the La Hoya member, Alconera Formation).
