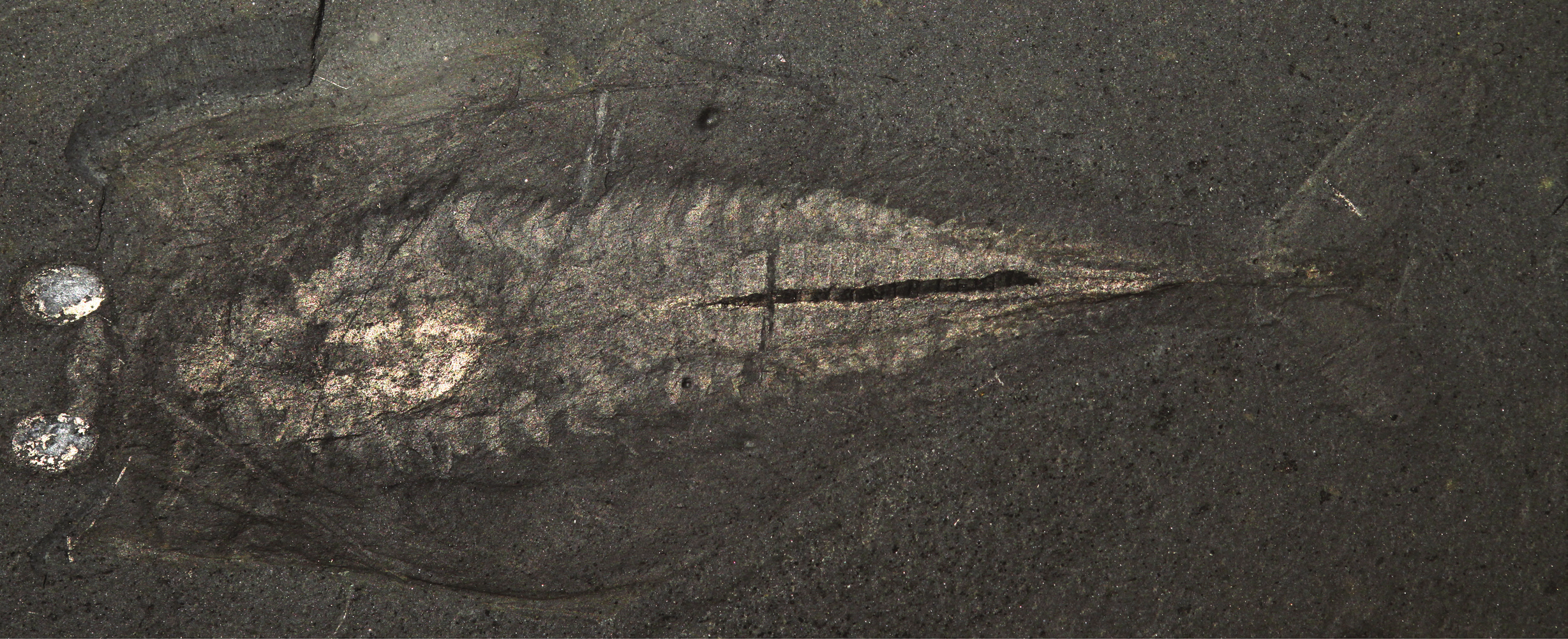
- Fossil
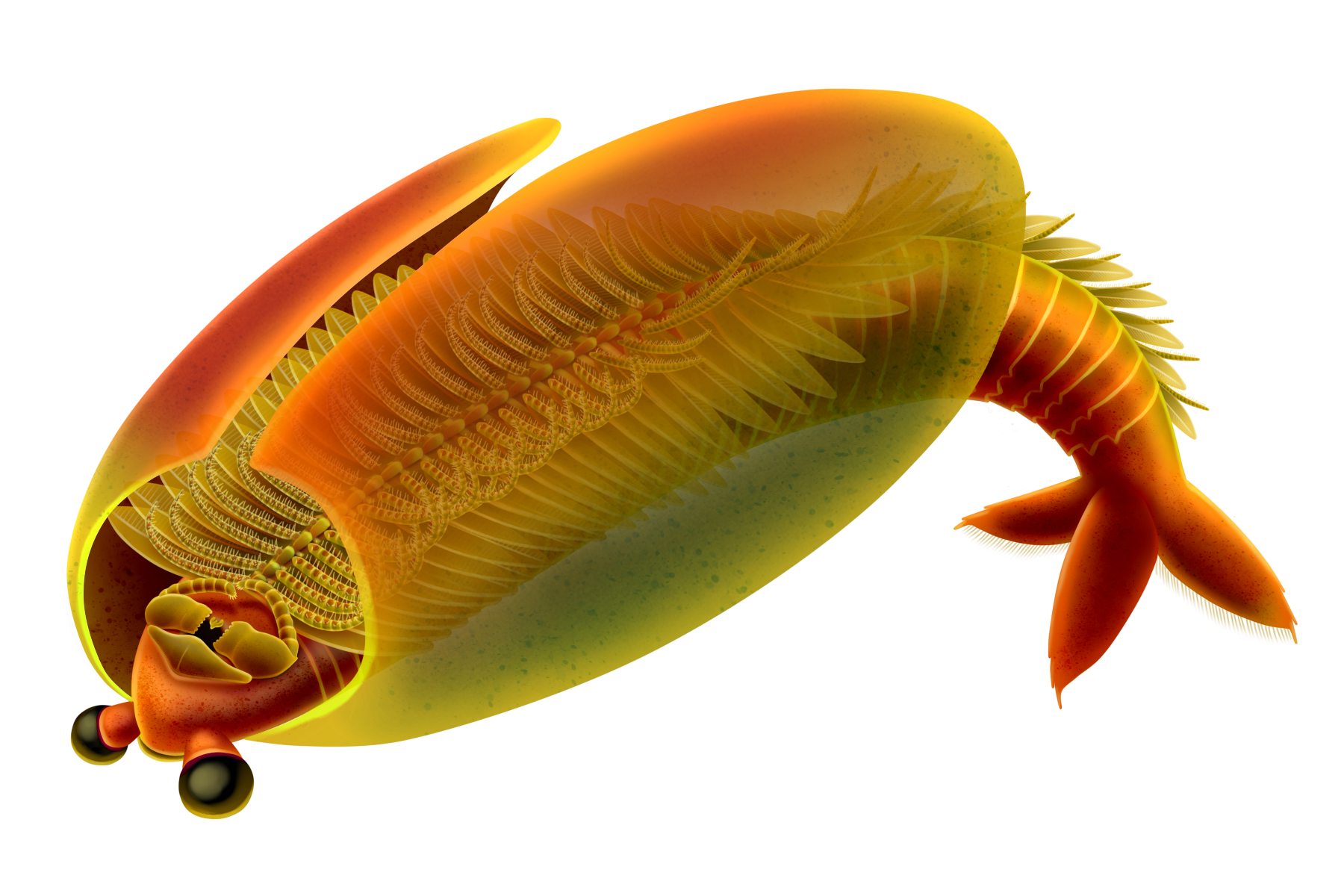
- Life restoration in presumed upside-down swimming position

Scientific classification
- Kingdom: Animalia
- Phylum: Arthropoda
- Order: †Hymenocarina
- Family: †Odaraiidae
- Genus: †Odaraia; Walcott, 1912
- Species: †O. alata

Binomial name
- †Odaraia alata Walcott, 1912

Synonyms
- Eurysaces pielus Simonetta and Delle Cave, 1975

= Odaraia =

Odaraia Temporal range: Cambrian Stage 3–Middle Cambrian

Extinct genus of Cambrian bivalved arthropod

Odaraia is an extinct genus of bivalved hymenocarine arthropod with a single known species Odaraia alata, found in the Middle Cambrian Burgess Shale in British Columbia, Canada.

== History of research and taxonomy ==
The genus and species were first described by Charles Walcott in 1912. It was placed into its own family, Odaraiidae by Simonetta and Delle Cave in 1975, which has been used to include other genera of bivalved Cambrian arthropods. The species was redescribed by Derek Briggs 1981, and again redescribed in 2024 by Izquierdo-López and Caron. While originally Odaraia and other odaraiids have been interpreted as basal euarthropods not closely related to any living arthropod group, the confirmation of the presence of mandibles in Odaraia places them firmly within the modern arthropod group Mandibulata. Odaraiidae is currently placed within Hymenocarina, which includes many other mandible bearing (when preserved) bivalved Cambrian arthropods.

== Description ==
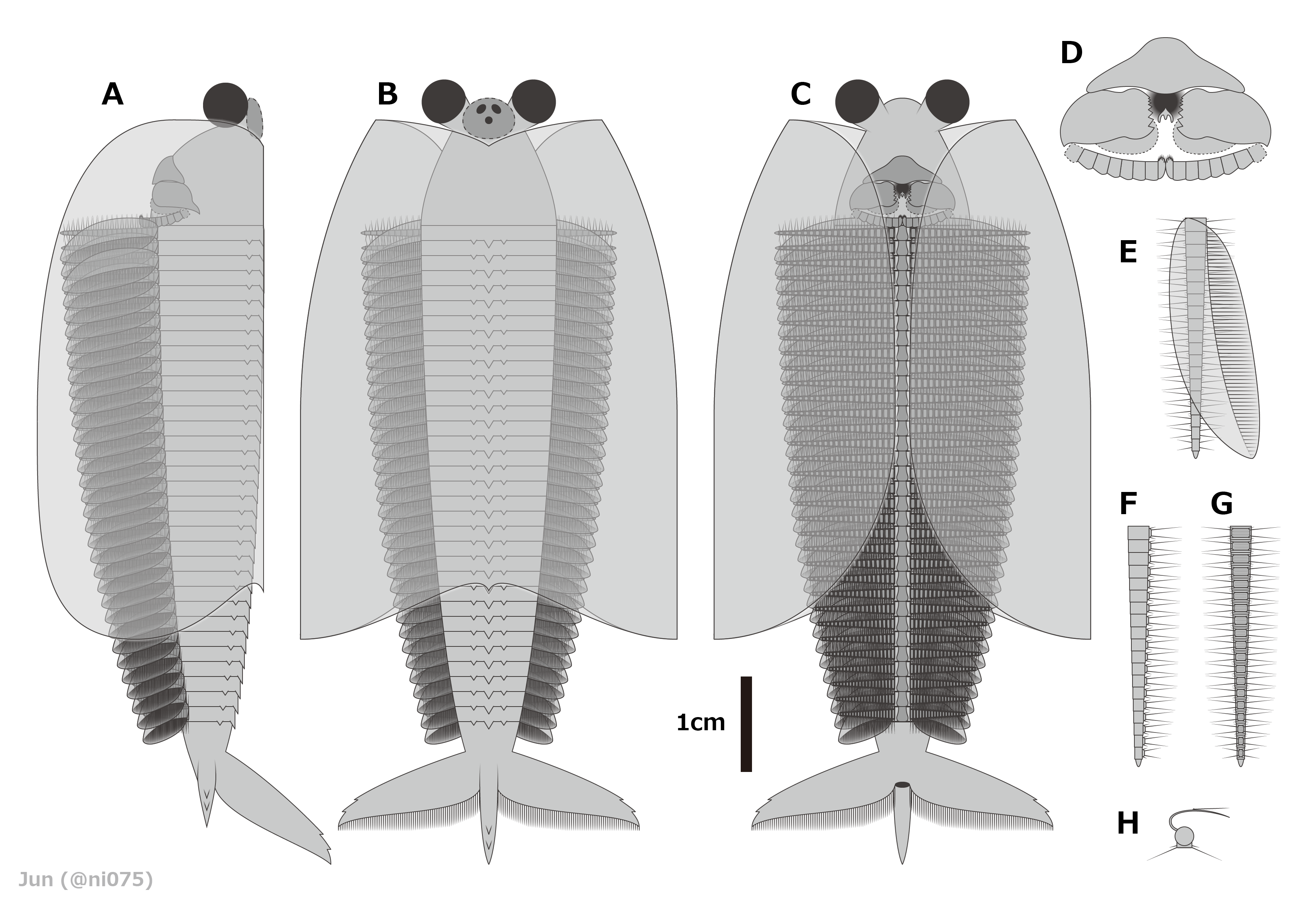
Diagram

Specimens of Odaraia reach up to 15 centimetres (5.9 in) in length. The head has a pair of two large compound eyes on short stalks, with three structures, presumed to be sensory organs, placed on the top of the head between them, which may be present on a distinct round structure, which has been assumed to be the ocular/anterior sclerite. The head either has very reduced or more probably no antennae. The frontmost part of underside of the head had a triangular structure, presumed to be the hypostome. The head has a pair of large mandibles nearly as long as they are wide, the ends of which are covered in pointed "teeth", with setae also being present. Just posterior the mandibles are another pair of appendages, probably maxillae, which are made up of seven or eight podomeres (segments), the final segments of which are covered in a significant number of setae (hair-like structures) At the end of the mouth furthest from the eyes, there is an unpaired element at the midline, called the "central tooth", which is highly sclerotized.

The body is covered in a bivalved carapace, which lacks a hinge, envelops much of the underside of the body, and covers the parts of the trunk and the head, around a half to two thirds of the total length. The trunk is composed of 30-35 ring shaped segments that decrease in width towards the posterior of the animal. These rings have each have a triangular shaped sternite on their underside. A central gut canal runs through the body, with the anus being located at the terminal trunk segment. Two specimens preserve lobes near the front of the gut canal, interpreted as gut diverticula. Each trunk segment has several (3-5 rows) of spines running along the upper midline and adjacent to it. Each trunk segment is associated with a pair of biramous (two-branched) limbs, the endopods (the lower, leg-like branches), are thin and tapers towards their ends, and have around 19-20 podomeres, which differ little from each other (that is, they are homonomous) Each podomere of the limbs has an endite (a structure projecting from the underside of the limb), which are round to cone shaped, and covered in downward (ventrally) and directed both to the side and downwards (ventro-laterally) facing spines of varying length. The exopods (outer limb branches) are composed of thin cuticular lamellae connected to a rod.

The body ends in a terminal trunk segment which is around 5 times longer than the preceding segment. It is conical in shape, and ends with three fin shaped segments, two projecting sideways (laterally) referred to as caudal rami, while one projects upwards (dorsally). The front (anterior) facing edges of the fins bear spines, and it is possible that the posterior edges of the caudal rami bear setae.

== Ecology ==
Odaraia is thought to have been a suspension feeder that used the spines on its trunk limb segments, which when overlapped with the spines present on the other limbs functioned like a mesh, to capture particulate matter (likely including zooplankton) from the water column, similar to living krill and fairy shrimp, with the spined limbs also likely used to bring particulate food towards the mouth. The "central tooth" structure likely served to grind prey. Odaraia is thought to have been nektobenthic (actively swimming near the seafloor). The three-pronged tail, which is unique among all known arthropods, has been assumed to have been used to stabilize the animal when swimming, helping it to steer, which is it is often assumed to have done while inverted (upside down).

217 specimens of Odaraia alata are known from the Greater Phyllopod Bed, where they comprise 0.41% of the community.

== Phylogeny ==
After Izquierdo-López and Caron (2024)

- - Hymenocarina
    - - - Tuzoia
        - Perspicaris
      - - Pectocaris
        - Protocarididae
          - Loricicaris
          - - Tokummia
            - Branchiocaris
    - - - - Plenocaris
          - - Ercaicunia
            - Clypecaris
        - - Pauloterminus
          - - Canadaspis
            - - Waptia
              - Chuandianella
      - - Vermontcaris
        - Odaraiidae
          - Odaraia
          - - Jugatacaris
            - - - Fibulacaris
                - Pakucaris
              - - Balhuticaris
                - Nereocaris

== See also ==
- Paleobiota of the Burgess Shale
