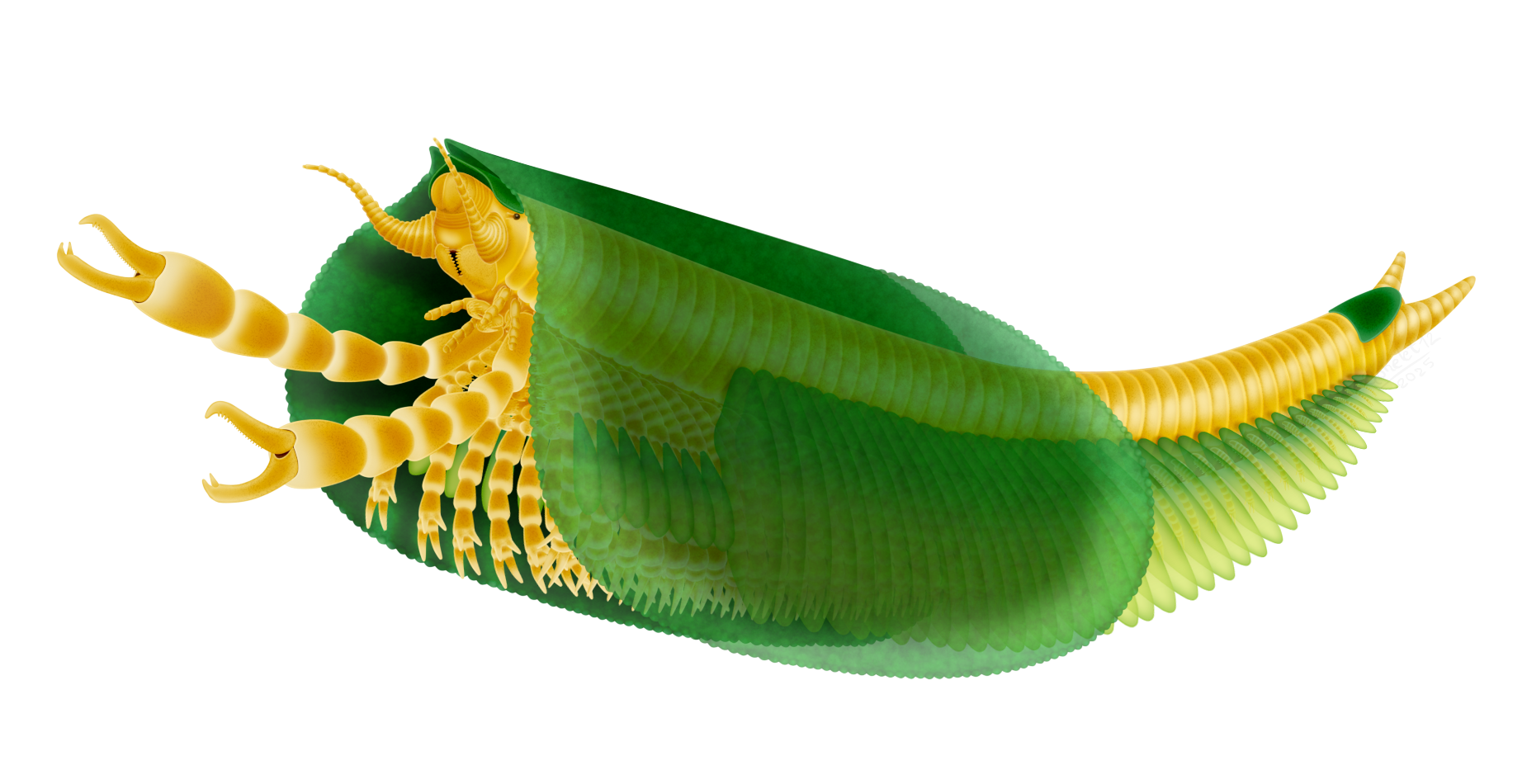
- Life restoration

Scientific classification
- Kingdom: Animalia
- Phylum: Arthropoda
- Order: †Hymenocarina
- Family: †Protocarididae
- Genus: †Tokummia
- Species: †T. katalepsis

Binomial name
- †Tokummia katalepsis Aria & Caron, 2017

= Tokummia =

Tokummia Temporal range: Wuliuan

Extinct species of arthropod

Tokummia is a genus of fossil hymenocarine arthropod, known only by one species, Tokummia katalepsis, from the middle Cambrian (508 million years old) Burgess Shale as found in a quarry in Marble Canyon in Canada.

== Etymology ==
The genus name Tokummia named after Tokumm Creek which runs through the Marble Canyon where it was found. The species name katalepsis is a Greek word for "seizing", "gasping" or "holding".

== Morphology ==
Tokummia has a cylindrical body, with the front (anterior) half covered by a 8.78 cm (3.46 in) long bivalved carapace. At the front of the animal, there are a pair of antennae, possible eyes, mouthparts (mandibles, maxillule and maxilla) and prominent pincer-like maxillipeds. These shows the oldest record of arthropod pincers. Posterior to the maxillipeds are 50 leg-bearing trunk segments. Each of its biramous leg has 5-segmented basipods, followed by an exopod (flap-like outer branch) and 7-segmented endopod (leg-like inner branch). The anterior 10 leg pairs have basipodal endites (inner spines) while the remaining leg pairs have wide exopods. The trunk terminated with a pair of caudal rami.

== Paleobiology ==
Tokummia is suggested to be a bottom feeder, being able to walk on the sea floor, and to occasionally swim, and used its pincers to catch prey.

== Taxonomy ==
Tokummia is placed in the family Protocarididae along with Branchiocaris, Protocaris and Loricicaris. Protocarididae is placed within the broader group Hymenocarina, which includes numerous arthropods with bivalved carapaces. Hymenocarina is placed within Mandibulata, which also includes myriapods (millipedes and centipedes), hexapods (including insects) and crustaceans,

Cladogram of Hymenocarina, following Izquierdo-López and Caron, (2024):

- - Hymenocarina
    - - - Tuzoia
        - Perspicaris
      - - Pectocaris
        - Protocarididae
          - Loricicaris
          - - Tokummia
            - Branchiocaris
    - - - - Plenocaris
          - - Ercaicunia
            - Clypecaris
        - - Pauloterminus
          - - Canadaspis
            - - Waptia
              - Chuandianella
      - - Vermontcaris
        - Odaraiidae
          - Odaraia
          - - Jugatacaris
            - - - Fibulacaris
                - Pakucaris
              - - Balhuticaris
                - Nereocaris
