= Marble Canyon (Canadian Rockies) =

Valley in British Columbia, Canada

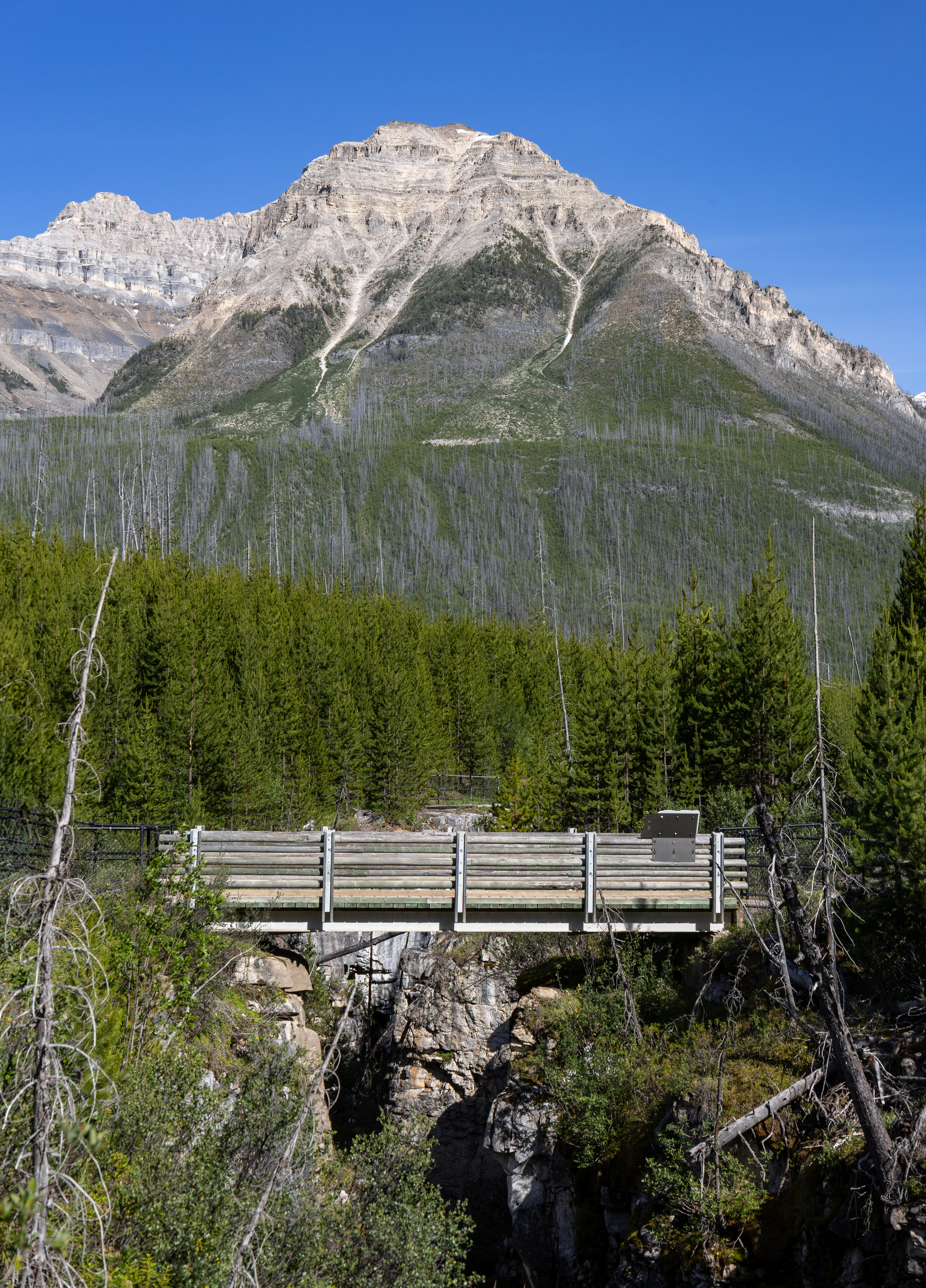
- Marble Canyon

- Location within British Columbia

Geography
- Country: Canada
- Province: British Columbia
- Regional district: Kootenay Land District
- Coordinates: 51°11′12″N 116°7′31″W
- Interactive map of Marble Canyon

Marble Canyon surrounds Tokumm Creek just above its confluence with the Vermilion River, at the north end of Kootenay National Park in the Canadian Rockies of British Columbia. South of the canyon on Highway 93 is Numa Falls on the Vermilion River.

As described by Canadian Alpine Journal in 1913, "[Tokumm Creek] joins Vermilion River through a magnificent gorge, or box canyon, so narrow that at several places the fissure, for it seems little more than a crack in the rock strata, is bridged by great boulders that have become wedged across it. It was a feature well worth seeing."

== Cambrian Lagerstatte ==
A major new find was announced in early 2014 of fossilized Cambrian soft-bodied organisms in or near Marble Canyon that rival or even surpass the nearby Burgess Shale fossil site in size and preservation. The report said that 22% of the observed species found in the initial excavation were new to science. Additionally, several species previously known only from Chinese Lagerstätten, created millions of years earlier, were also found at the site. The exact location of the site was kept confidential to avoid it being damaged.

== Species discoveries ==
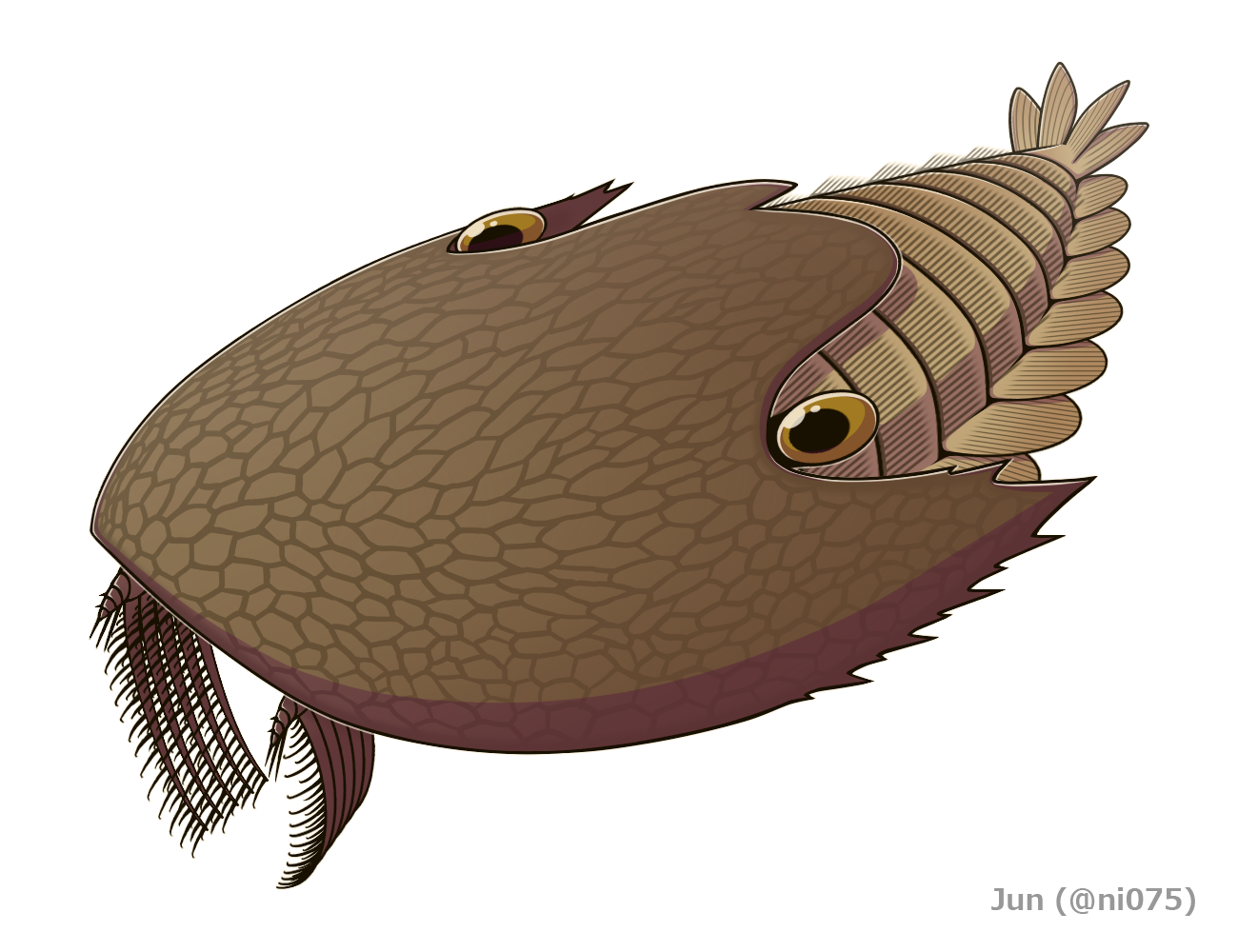
Cambroraster falcatus

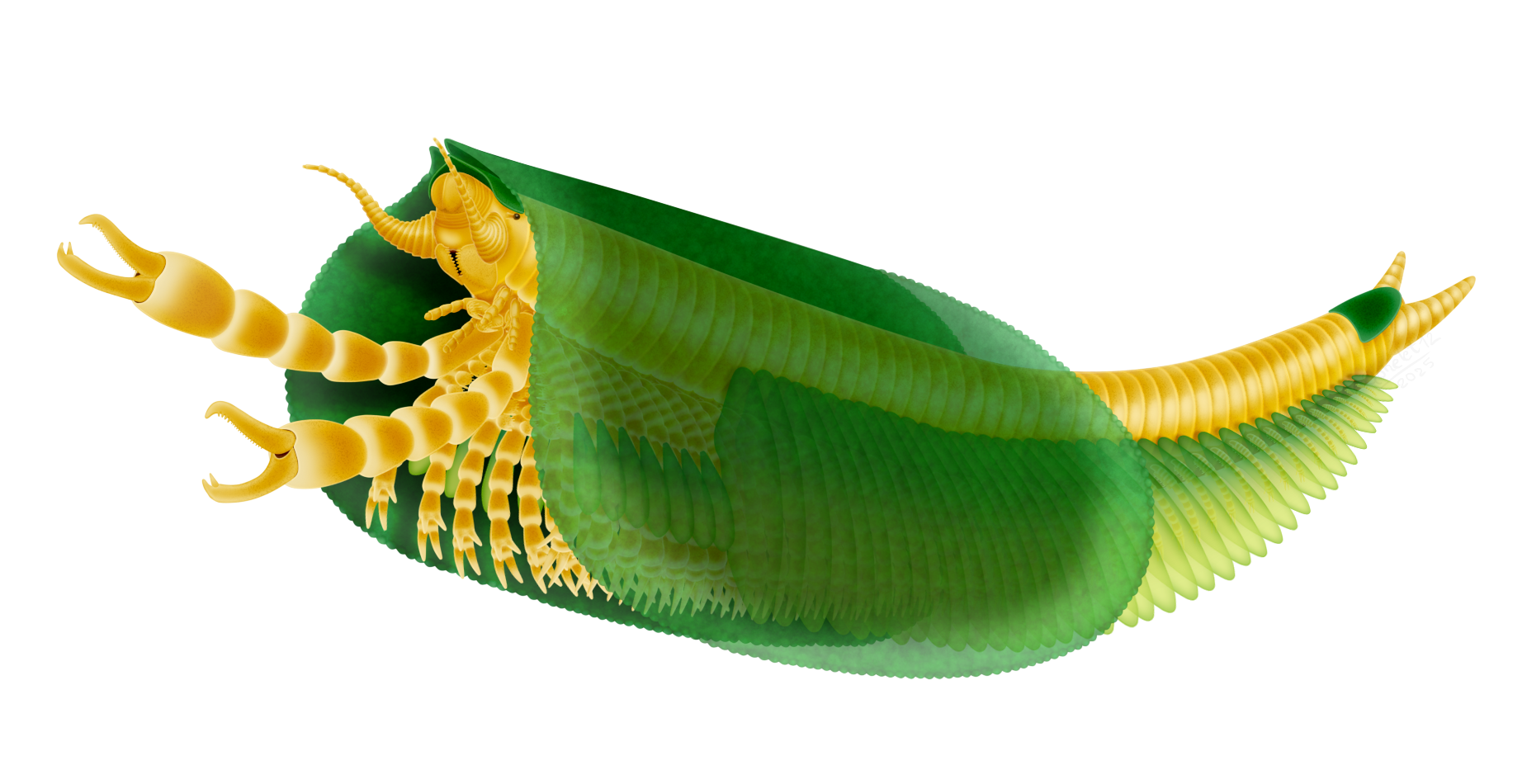
Tokummia katalepsis

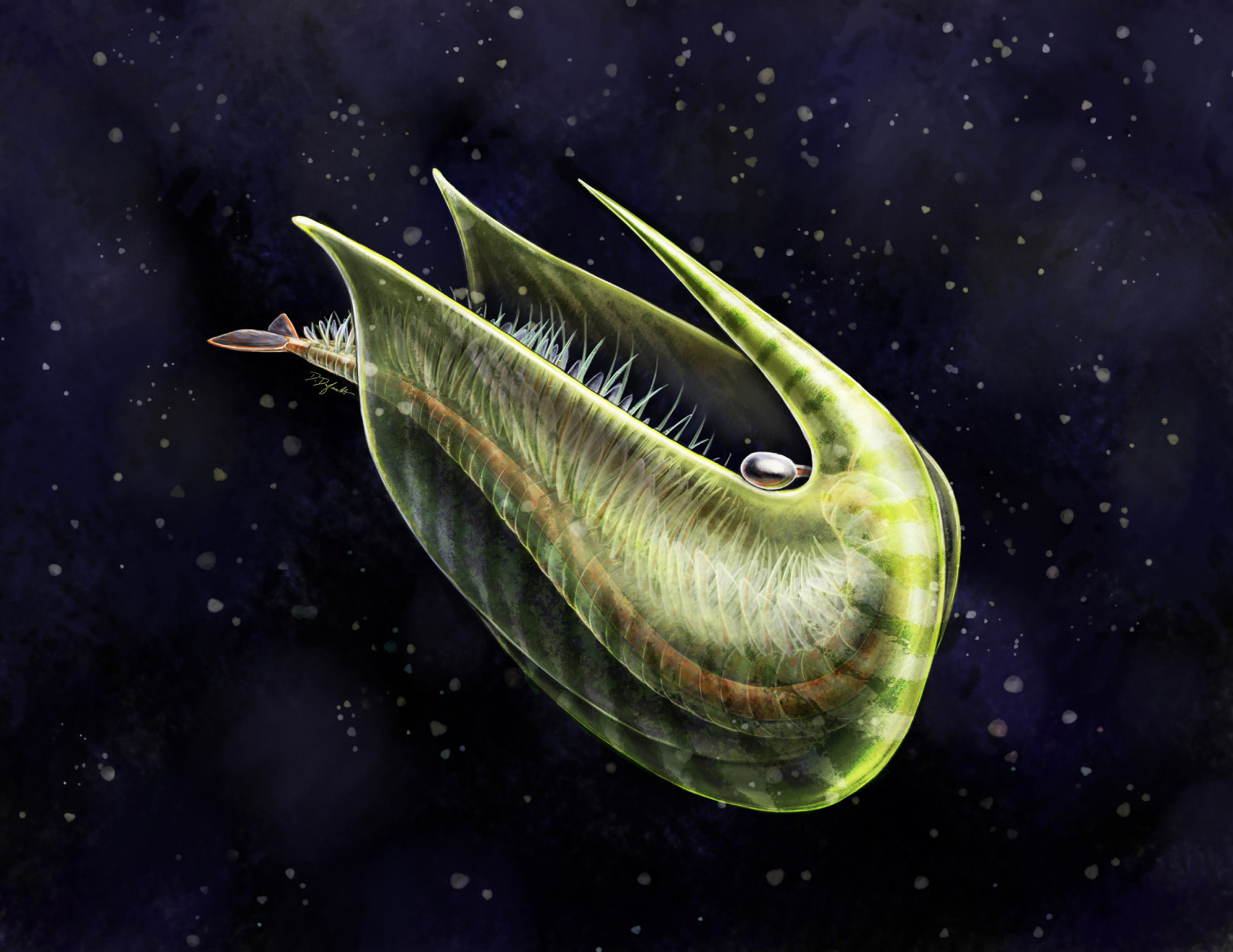
Fibulacaris nereidis

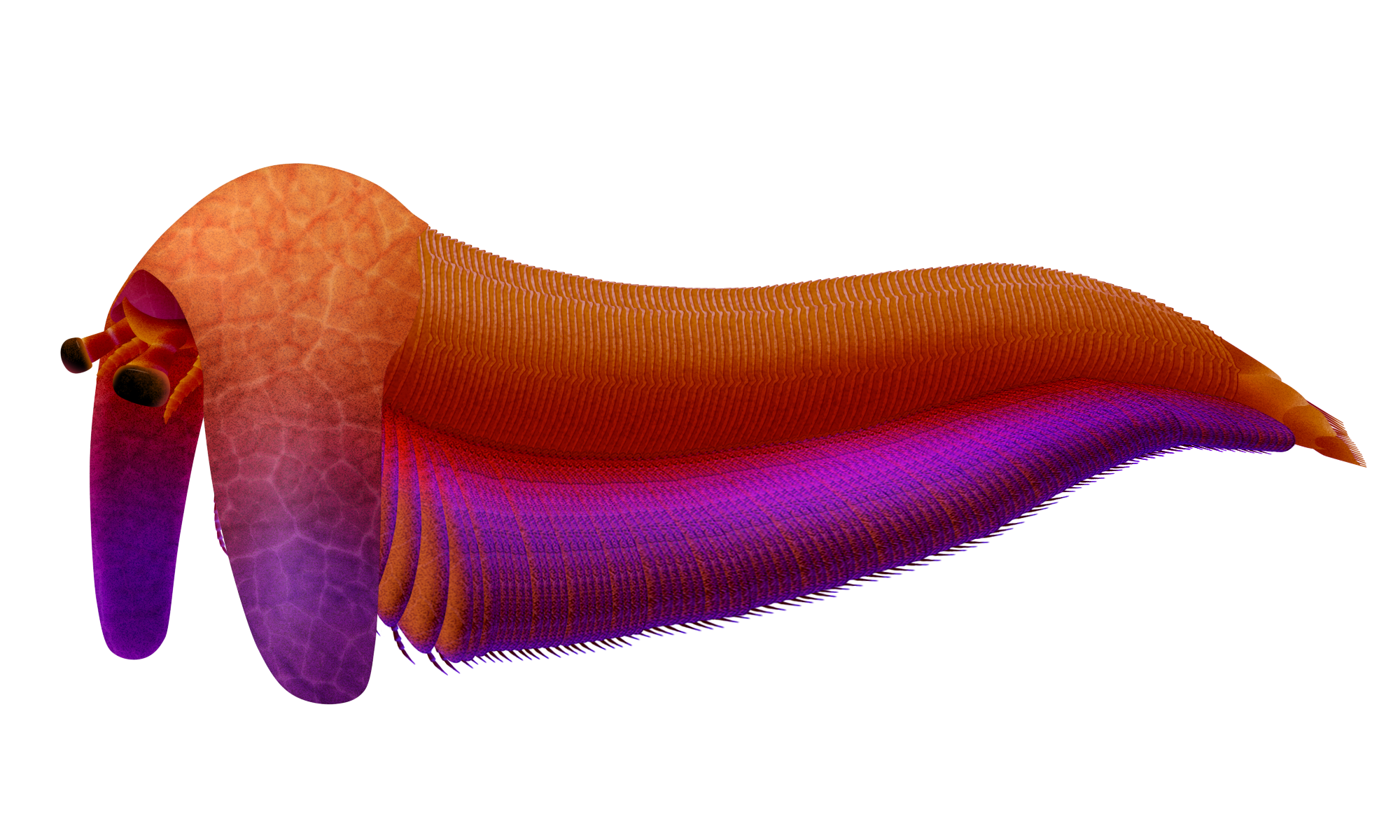
Balhuticaris voltae

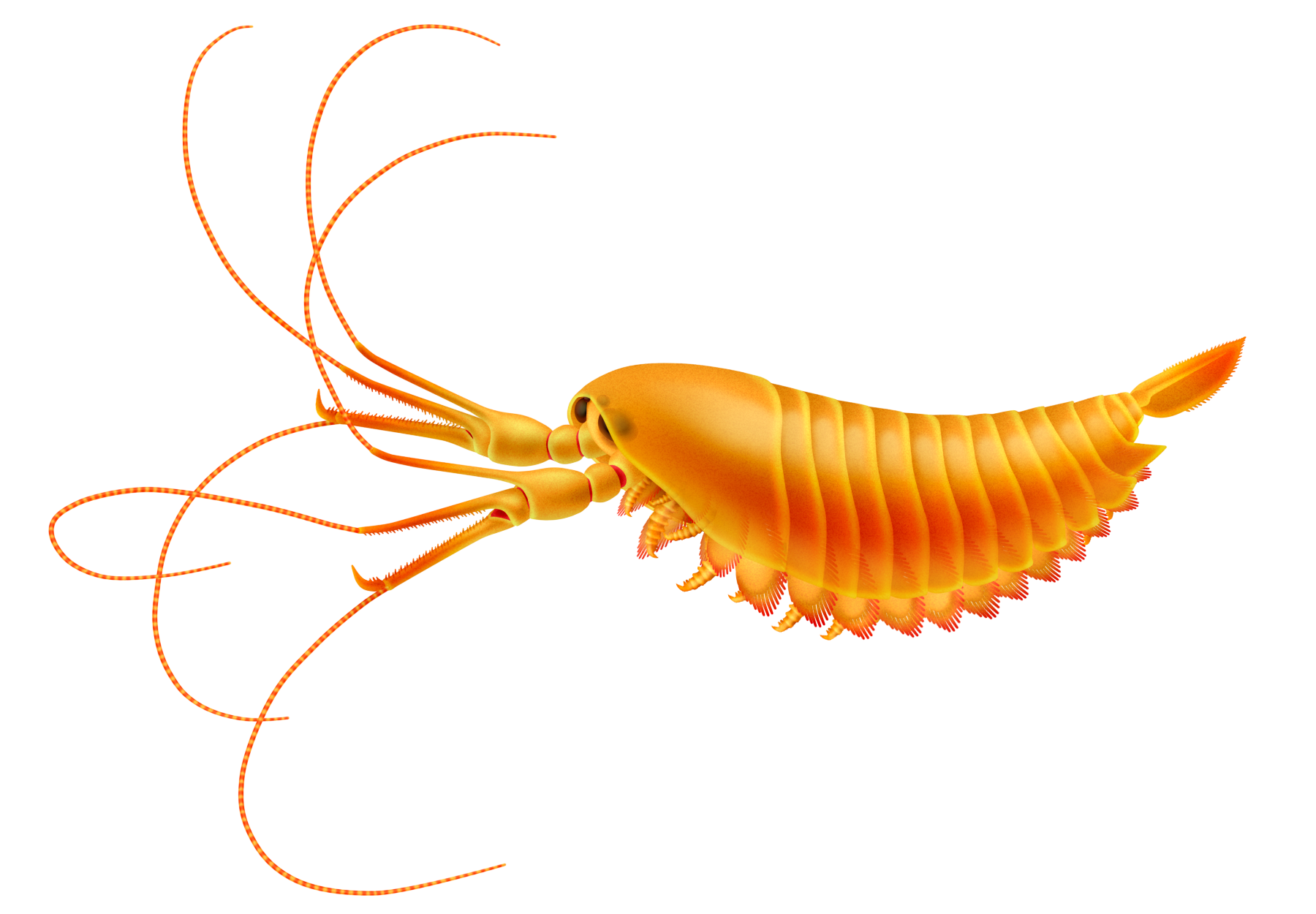
Yawunik kootenayi

Metaspriggina walcotti

Based on Caron et al. (2014) unless otherwise noted. Fossils first described from Marble Canyon appear in bold.

- **Cambroraster falcatus**
- **Titanokorys gainesi**
- Mosura fentoni
- Hurdia
- **Tokummia katalepsis**
- Branchiocaris sp.
- Perspicaris
- **Fibulacaris nereidis**
- **Pakucaris apatis**
- **Balhuticaris voltae**
- Tuzoia cf. burgessensis
- **Surusicaris elegans**
- **Yawunik kootenayi** (178 specimens as 2020)
- Alalcomenaeus sp.
- **Mollisonia plenovenatrix** (=M. symmetrica in Caron et al. 2014)
- Sidneyia inexpectans (252 specimens as 2020)
- Liangshanella cf. burgessensis
- Naraoia compacta
- **Naraoia** (**Misszhouia**) **canadensis** (=M. cf. longicaudata in Caron et al. 2014)
- Elrathina cf. marginalis
- Bathyuriscus sp.
- Kootenia cf. burgessensis
- Zacanthoides sp.
- Ehmaniella
- Itagnostus interstrictus
- Ptychagnostus cf. praecurrens
- Peronopsis (2707 specimens as 2020)
- Marrella splendens
- Primicaris cf. larvaformis (119 specimens as 2020)
- Molaria spinifera
- Selkirkia tubes
- Metaspriggina walcotti (235 specimens as 2020)
- Banffia
- Oesia disjuncta (Margaretia dorus) (3373 specimens as 2020)
- **Kootenayscolex barbarensis** (=Burgessochaeta cf. setigera in Caron et al. 2014) (833 specimens as 2020)
- **Ursactis comosa** (>580 specimens as 2023)
- Prototreta n. sp. aff. P. interrupta
- Eoobolus sp.
- Linnarssonia sp.
- Mellopegma sp. aff. M. georginense
- Haplophrentis cf. carinatus (3694 specimens as 2020)
