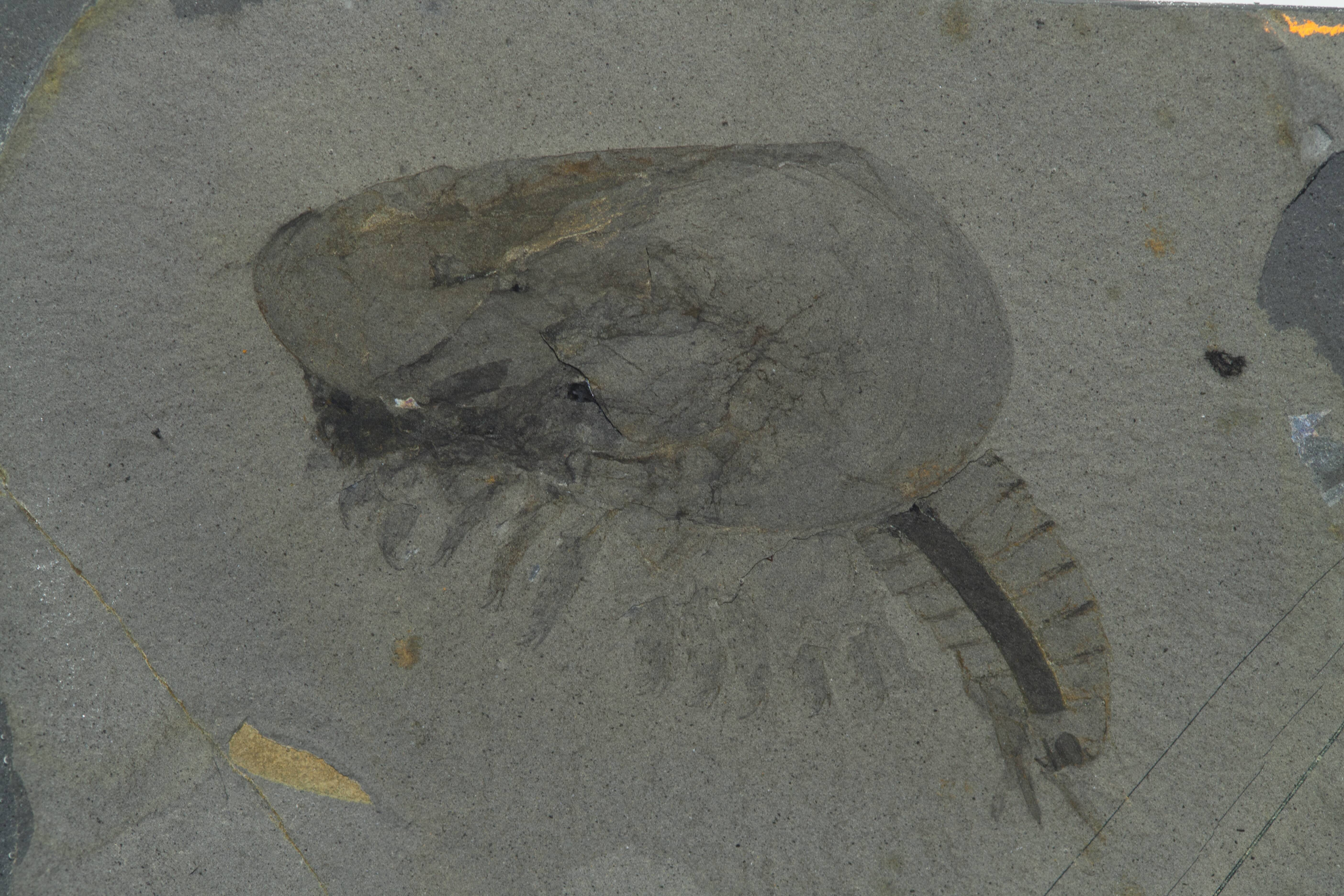
- Specimen of Canadaspis perfecta from the Burgess Shale
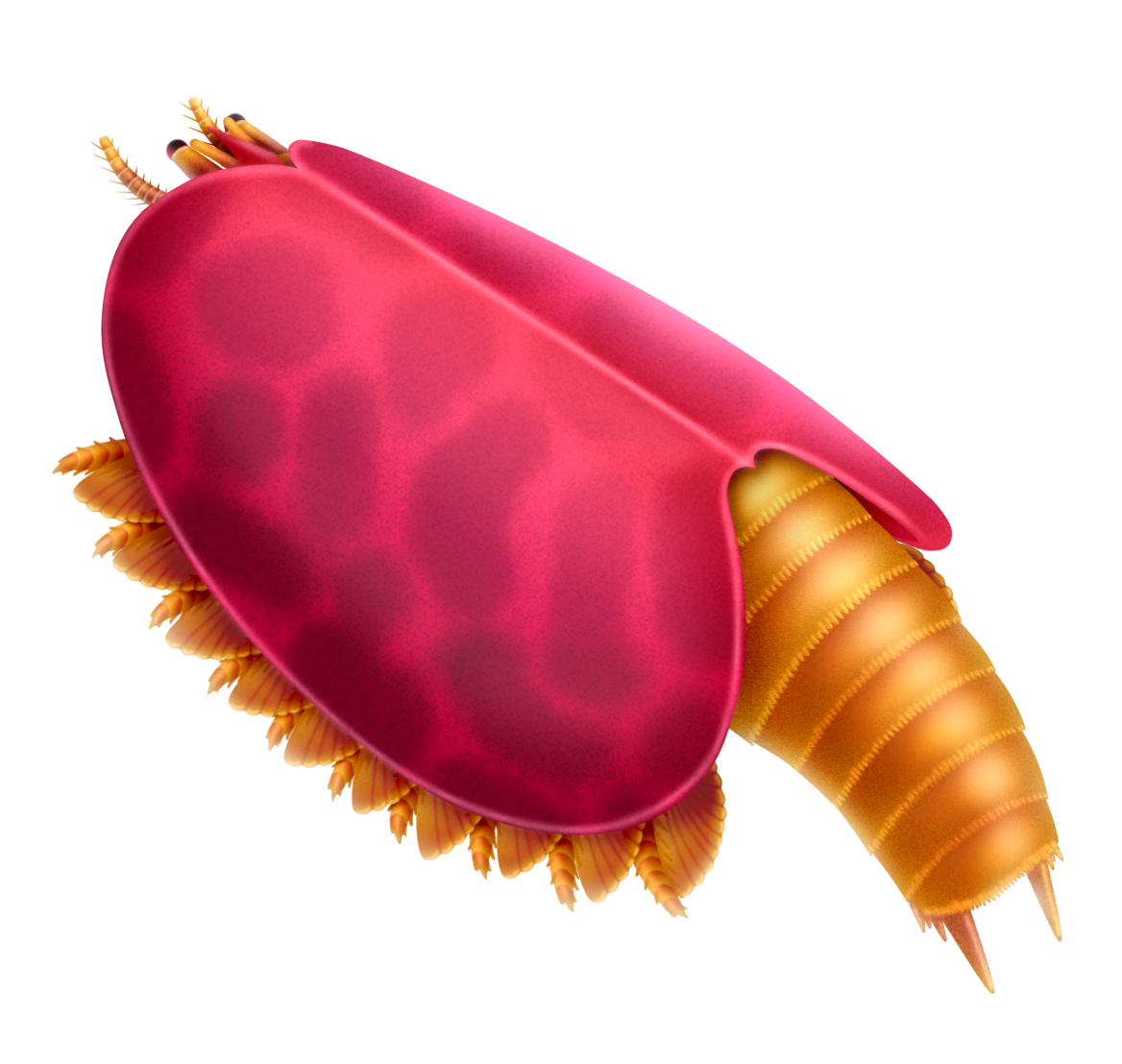
- Life restoration of Canadaspis perfecta

Scientific classification
- Kingdom: Animalia
- Phylum: Arthropoda
- Order: †Hymenocarina
- Family: †Canadaspididae
- Genus: †Canadaspis; Novozhilov in Orlov, 1960

Species
- C. perfecta (Walcott 1912) (type); C. laevigata Hou and Bergström, 1991

Synonyms
- Canadapsis (lapsus calami); Synonyms of C. perfecta: Hymenocaris perfecta Walcott, 1912; Canadaspis obesa Simonetta & delle Cave, 1975; Synonyms of C. laevigata: Canadaspis eucallus Chen & Zhou, 1997

= Canadaspis =

Canadaspis Temporal range: Cambrian Stage 3–Wuliuan

Extinct genus of arthropods

Canadaspis ("Shield of Canada") is an extinct genus of bivalved Cambrian marine arthropod, known from North America and China. They are thought to have been benthic feeders that moved mainly by walking and possibly used their biramous appendages to stir mud in search of food. They have been placed within the Hymenocarina, which includes other bivalved Cambrian arthropods.

== Description ==
=== Canadaspis perfecta ===
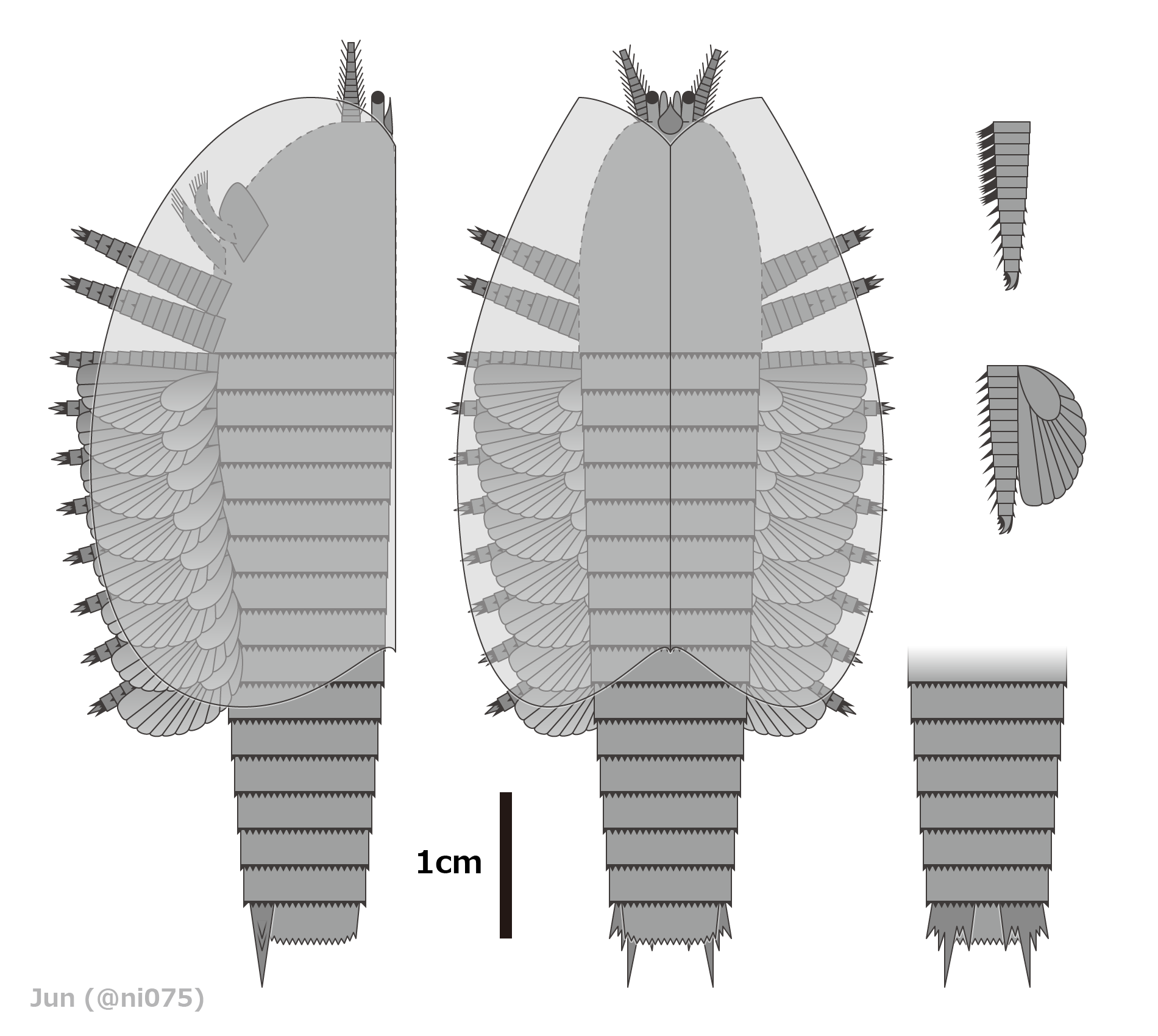
Diagrammatic reconstruction of C. perfecta

The bivalved carapaces of Canadaspis perfecta are typically 8–52 millimetres (0.31–2.05 in) in length, which taper towards the front end. The head had a small pair of eyes borne on short stalks. Between the eyes is a forward pointing spine, as well as a pair of short antennae, which appear to lack segmentation. Similar antennae are known from Waptia, and are probably homologous to the hemi-ellipsoid bodies of crustaceans, and thus likely have an olfactory (odor-sensing) function. The head also has another pair of larger, segmented antennae, probably with more than 12 segments, the segments increased in length toward the end of the antenna, with the front end of the segments bearing slender, forward-facing spines. The head had a pair of mandibles and maxillae (both of which are modified limbs used in food processing). The mandible bore a mandibular palp, which was fringed with setae (hair-like structures), with the mandible having a toothed margin. The head had two pairs of cephalothoracic legs which have prominently developed endites (structures which project from the underside of the limb), with the legs ending in a terminal claw. It is unclear whether these limbs were uniramous (one branched) or biramous (divided into two branches). The body had over a dozen segments divided into an anterior (front half) thorax with legs, covered by the carapace, and a posterior legless exposed abdomen. The thorax had 8 associated pairs of biramous legs. The limb endopods (the lower, leg-like branches) were segmented, probably with 13-14 segments, and also ended in a terminal claw. The exopods (the outer limb branches) were lobe-shaped, with 9 or 10 rays radiating outwards from their edges. The abdomen terminated with a telson, which bore a pair of spinose projections directed posteriorly on its lower edge, each spinose projection consisted of one large spine and 5 smaller spines.

=== Canadaspis laevigata ===
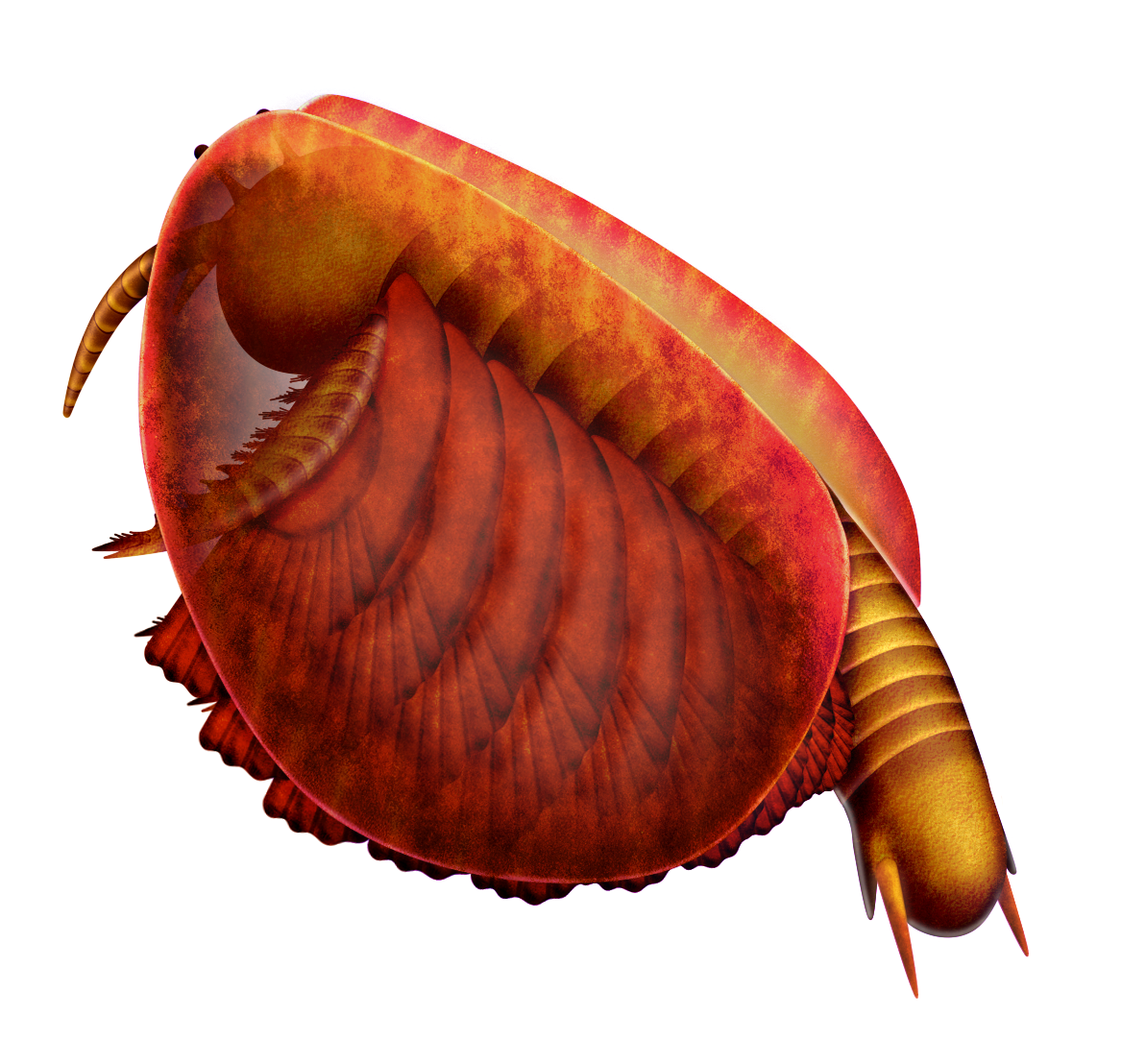
Life restoration of Canadaspis laevigata

The bivalved carapace of C. laevigata is similar to that of C. perfecta, though typically smaller in size. The head has a pair of stalked eyes and a pair of segmented uniramous antennae. The body has 19 ring-like tergites (segments). There are ten pairs of biramous appendages, the first of which appear to be located on the head, which the remaining nine run along the body. The first five pairs are roughly equal in size, while the remaining pairs gradually decrease in size posteriorly. The biramous limbs are all relatively similar in morphology. The endopods are robust, and end in claws. The exopod is flat and rounded. The body ends a telson, which is proportionally longer than that of C. perfecta, which bore one large and one small pair of spines, projecting posteriorly.

== Ecology ==
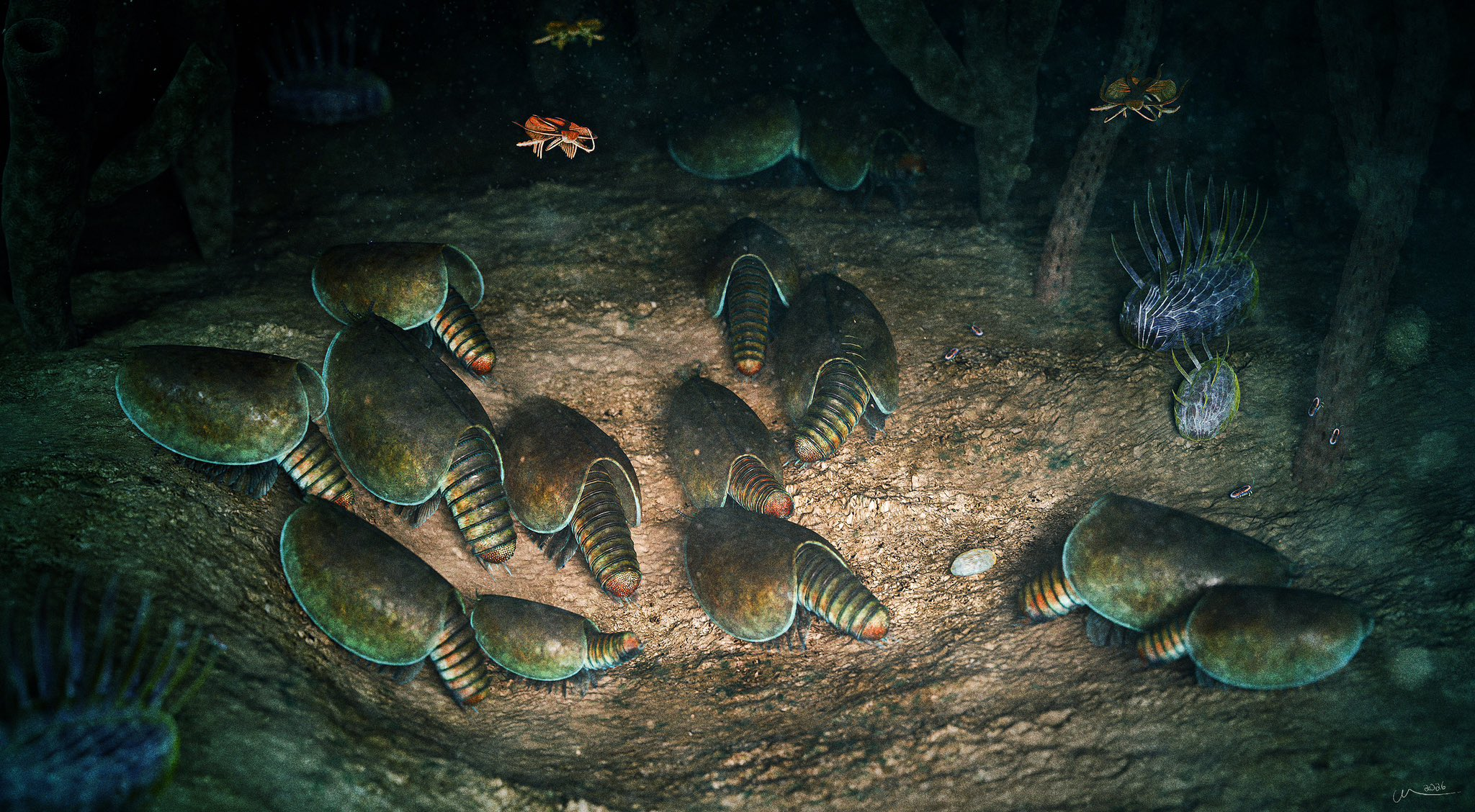
Members of Canadaspis perfecta engaging in group moulting in the Phyllopod Bed of the Burgess Shale, with Wiwaxia and Marrella also visible.

Canadaspis was likely a benthic animal that lived walking along the seafloor. C. perfecta had claws on the end of its appendages which may have been used to stir up sediment, or to scrape off the top layer, which Derek Briggs suggested may have been a nutritious layer of microbes. Large particles it stirred up would have been captured by spines on the inside of its legs; these spines would have directed the food particles to the organism's mouth, where it used its mandibles to grind larger particles.

Its antennae served a sensory function. The spines on the head of C. perfecta probably served to protect its vulnerable eyes from predators. Its limbs probably moved in a metachronal sequence to produce a rippling motion. Although Canadaspis probably did not swim, this could have helped propel the organism from under soft sediments. The appendages also produced currents which would have helped with feeding and respiration.

Members of C. perfecta appear to have engaged in synchronised group moulting.

== Classification ==
Canadaspis perfecta was originally described by Charles Doolittle Walcott in 1912 as Hymenocaris perfecta. It was placed into the new separate genus Canadaspis in 1960 by Novozhilov.

Canadaspis was historically interpreted as a crustacean, but this interpretation is now rejected. It has alternatively been suggested to be a stem-group euarthropod. It is currently thought to be a member of the group Hymenocarina, which are interpreted as mandibulates. Some scientists believe that Canadaspis laevigata should be placed in a separate genus.

Phylogeny of Hymenocarina after Izquierdo-López and Caron (2024)

- - Hymenocarina
    - - - Tuzoia
        - Perspicaris
      - - Pectocaris
        - Protocarididae
          - Loricicaris
          - - Tokummia
            - Branchiocaris
    - - - - Plenocaris
          - - Ercaicunia
            - Clypecaris
        - - Pauloterminus
          - - Canadaspis
            - - Waptia
              - Chuandianella
      - - Vermontcaris
        - Odaraiidae
          - Odaraia
          - - Jugatacaris
            - - - Fibulacaris
                - Pakucaris
              - - Balhuticaris
                - Nereocaris

== Fossil occurrences ==
4525 specimens of Canadaspis perfecta are known from the Greater Phyllopod bed, of the Burgess Shale in British Columbia, Canada, where they comprise 8.6% of the community. Other specimens of Canadaspis, considered closely related or belonging to C. perfecta, are also found in the Spence Shale of western Utah as well as the Pioche Shale of Nevada. Canadaspis laevigata comes from the Chengjiang biota of Yunnan, China and is thus some 10 million years older than Canadaspis perfecta.

== See also ==
- Paleobiota of the Burgess Shale
