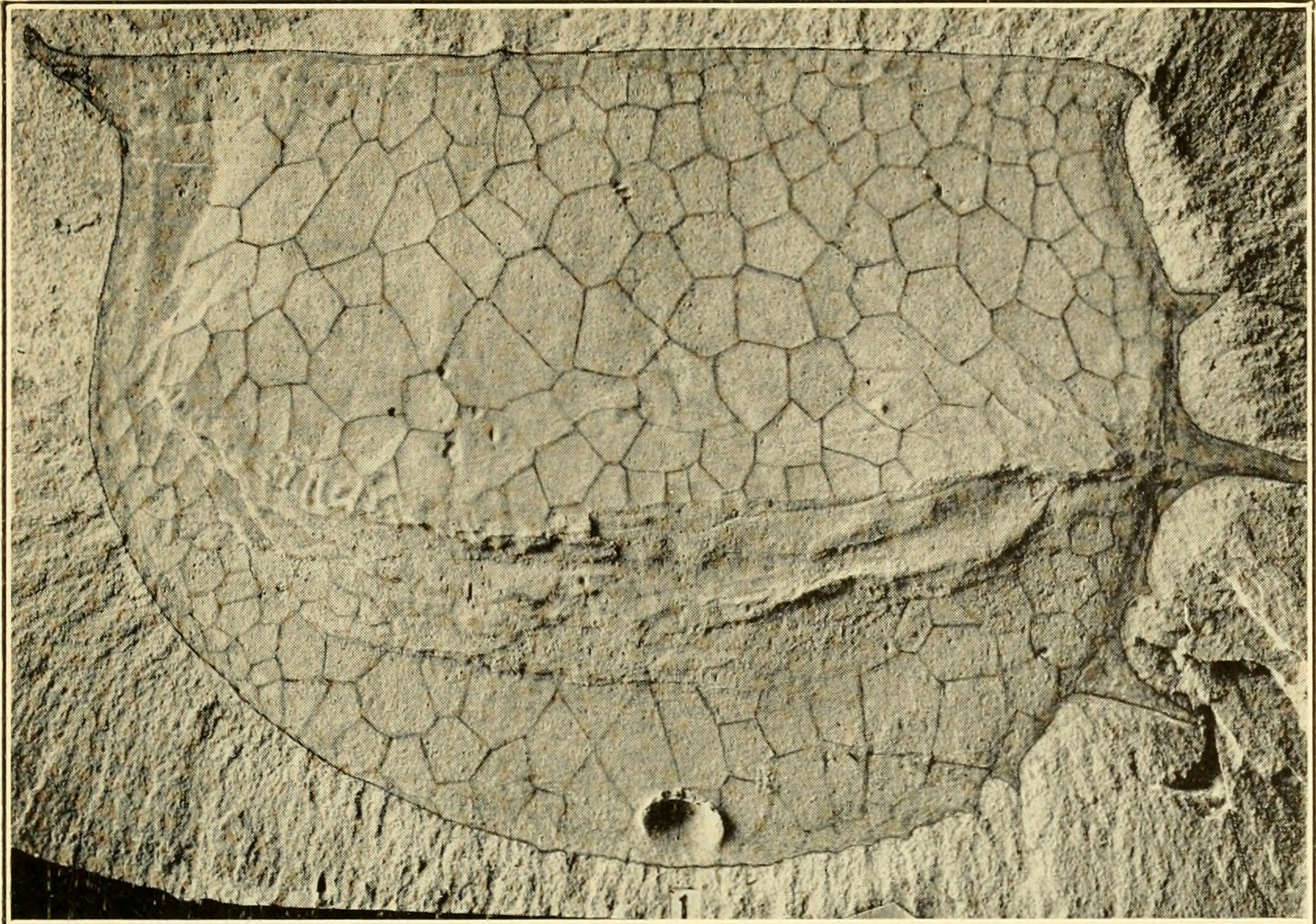
- Carapace of Tuzoia retifera
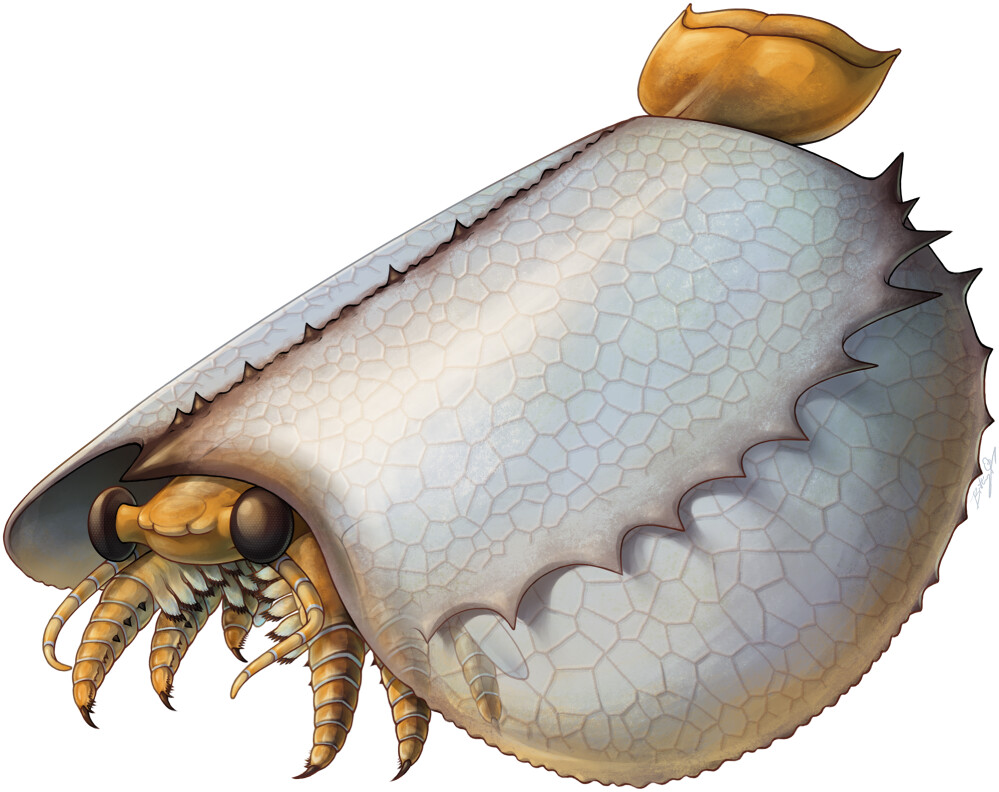
- Life restoration

Scientific classification
- Kingdom: Animalia
- Phylum: Arthropoda
- Order: †Hymenocarina
- Family: †Tuzoiidae
- Genus: †Tuzoia; Walcott, 1912

Type species
- Tuzoia retifera Walcott, 1912

Species
- See text

= Tuzoia =

Tuzoia Temporal range: Cambrian Series 2–Miaolingian

Extinct genus of arthropod

Tuzoia (from Mount Tuzo, a mountain in the Canadian Rockies) is an extinct genus of large bivalved arthropod known from Early to Middle Cambrian marine environments from what is now North America, Australia, China, Europe and Siberia. The large, domed carapace reached lengths of 180 millimetres (7.1 in), making them amongst the largest known Cambrian arthropods.

== Description ==
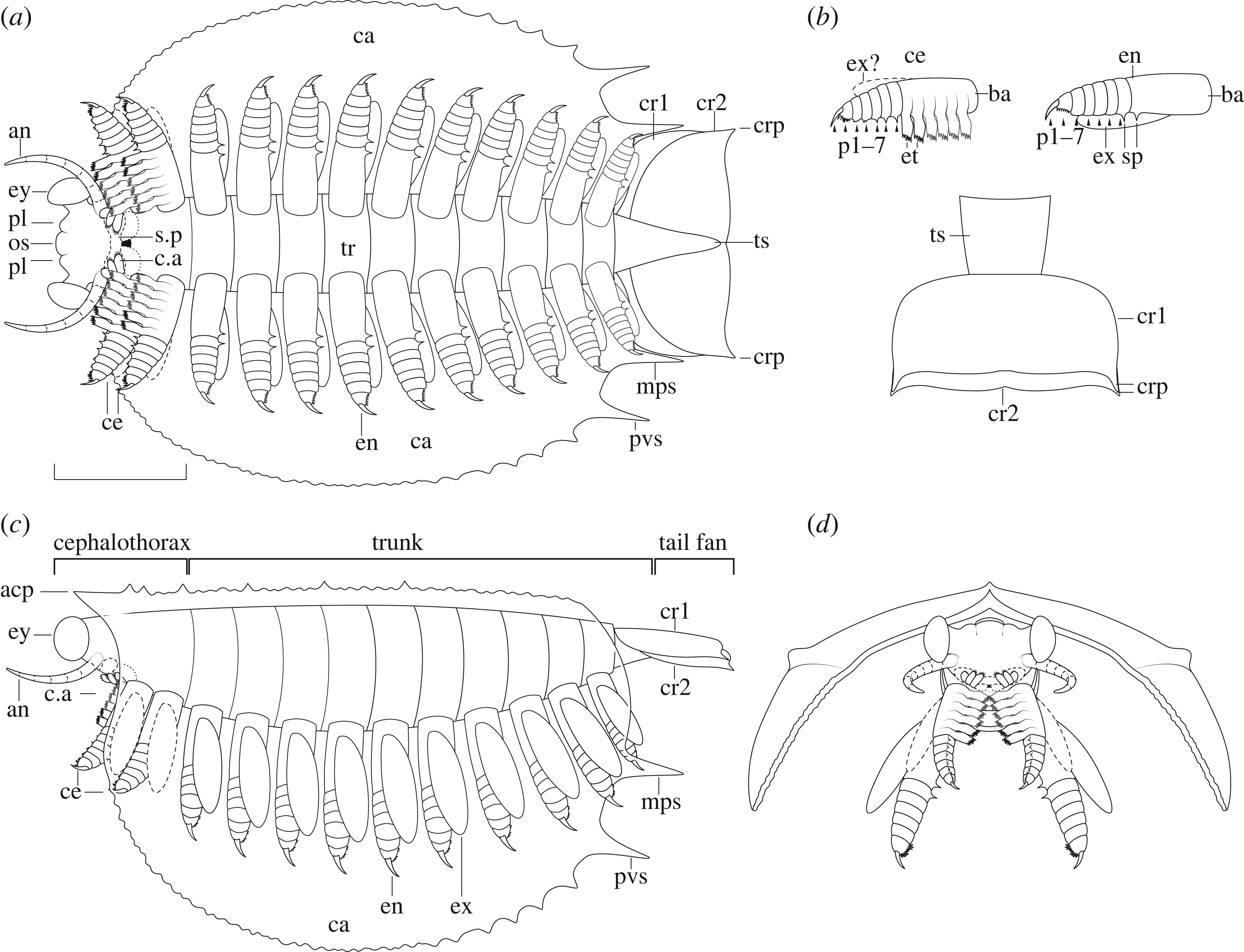
Diagrammatic reconstruction

The largest carapaces of Tuzoia are known to reach 18 cm (7.1 in) in length, suggesting a total body length of approximately 23 cm (9.1 in). Along the sides of the carapace a spiked ridge is present, and the edges and midline of the carapace are also spiked in many species. These spines likely functioned to aid stability while swimming. The carapaces are marked with a reticulate (net-like) pattern, which was likely to increase the structural integrity of the valves while remaining lightweight. The head had a anterior/ocular sclerite at the top, a single pair of large stalked eyes, and a pair of segmented antennae. The head also bore pairs of cephalic appendages, which have curved setae. The first two limb pairs, dubbed the "cephalothoracic legs" have 7 podomeres (segments), with spinose endites (structures that project downwards from the limbs), with the legs ending in a terminal claw. The basipods (basalmost segments of the limbs closest to the body) are greatly elongated, and bears 5 to 6 endites, which become spinose at their ends. It is unclear whether exopods (the upper branch of a two branched (biramous) limb) are present on these limbs. There are likely 10 pairs of trunk legs excluding the cephalothoracic legs. These had seven podomeres, the first with a spinose endite, with the limb ending in a terminal claw, and a similarly elongated basipod, which had a spine proximal to that of the first podomere. These limbs likely had paddle-shaped exopods. The body terminates with a large tail fan.

== Ecology ==
Tuzoia was likely an actively swimming organism. It had historically been considered a pelagic organism, due to their wide distribution. However, the soft tissues described in 2022 suggest an alternative interpretation as an animal that swam close to the seafloor (nektobenthic) as a predator or a scavenger. Tuzoia was likely capable of walking along the seafloor with the carpace flexing outwards to allow the legs to contact the substrate.

== Taxonomy ==
They were formerly considered to be the only members of the family Tuzoiidae until 2022, when a new genus Duplapex was described from the Cambrian of China, which differs from Tuzoia by having a flat carapace. Their phylogenetic position was long uncertain due to the lack of soft tissue remains, a close relationship with Isoxys was proposed based on similarities of their carapaces. However soft tissues described in 2022 suggest instead that Tuzoia was a member of Mandibulata, as the earliest diverging member of a paraphyletic Hymenocarina, and that similarities to isoxyids may be due to retained plesiomorphies.

=== Species ===
After Vannier et al., 2007, and subsequent literature:

- Tuzoia retifera Walcott, 1912 (type) Burgess Shale, Canada, Utah, USA
- Tuzoia burgessensis Resser, 1929, Burgess Shale, Canada
- Tuzoia guntheri Robison & Richards, 1981 Marjum Formation Utah, USA
- Tuzoia bispinosa Yuan and Zhao, 1999 Kaili Formation, Guizhou, China
- Tuzoia polleni Resser, 1929 Eager Formation, Canada, Parker Shale, Vermont, Pioche Shale, Nevada Kinzers Formation, Pennsylvania, USA
- Tuzoia australis Glaessner, 1979 Emu Bay Shale, Australia
- Tuzoia manchuriensis Resser and Endo, 1937 Tangshih Formation Liaoning, China (poorly known)
- Tuzoia sinensis P'an, 1957 Wulongqing Formation Yunnan, China (poorly known)
- Tuzoia tylodesa Luo et Hu et al., 2006 Wulongqing Formation Yunnan, China
- Tuzoia multispinosa Zhao, 2015 Wulongqing Formation Yunnan, China
- Tuzoia lazizhaiensis Wen et al., 2019 Balang Formation, Hunan, China.
- Tuzoia jianheensis Chen and Zhao, 2017 Tsinghsutung Formation, Guzihou, China
- Tuzoia isuelaensis Izquierdo-López et al., 2025 Murero biota, Spain
- ?Tuzoia parva

Indeterminate remains are also known from the Buchava Formation and Jince Formation of the Czech Republic. As well as the Sinsk Biota of Siberia.

Phylogeny of Hymenocarina after Izquierdo-López and Caron (2024)

- - Hymenocarina
    - - - Tuzoia
        - Perspicaris
      - - Pectocaris
        - Protocarididae
          - Loricicaris
          - - Tokummia
            - Branchiocaris
    - - - - Plenocaris
          - - Ercaicunia
            - Clypecaris
        - - Pauloterminus
          - - Canadaspis
            - - Waptia
              - Chuandianella
      - - Vermontcaris
        - Odaraiidae
          - Odaraia
          - - Jugatacaris
            - - - Fibulacaris
                - Pakucaris
              - - Balhuticaris
                - Nereocaris

== See also ==
- Paleobiota of the Burgess Shale
