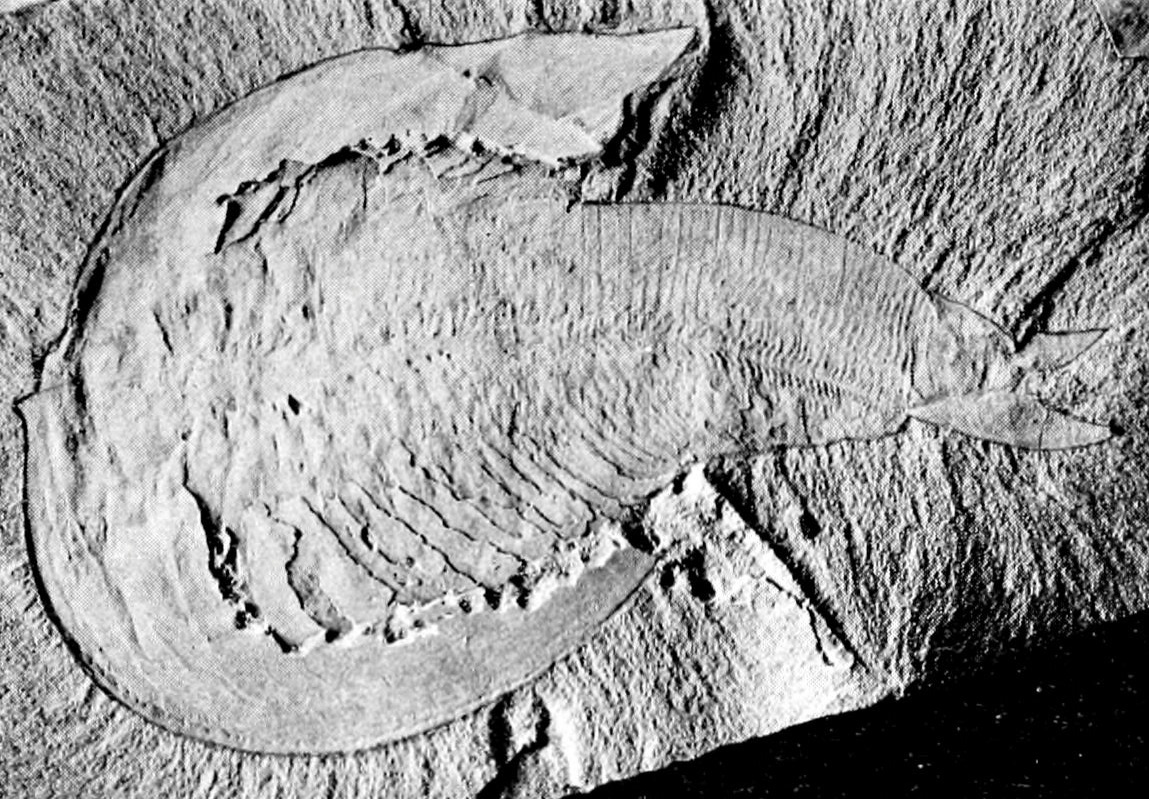
- Fossil holotype of Branchiocaris pretiosa
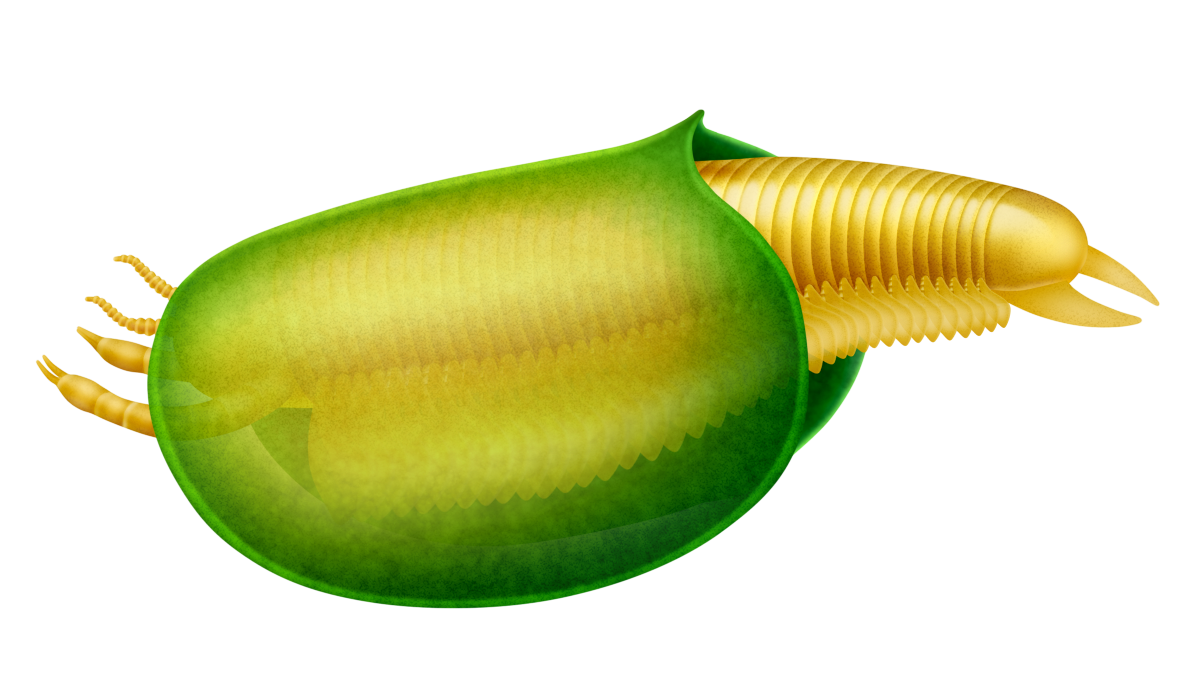
- Reconstruction of Branchiocaris pretiosa

Scientific classification
- Kingdom: Animalia
- Phylum: Arthropoda
- Order: †Hymenocarina
- Family: †Protocarididae
- Genus: †Branchiocaris; Briggs, 1976

Species
- Branchiocaris pretiosa (Resser, 1929) (type); Branchiocaris? yunnanensis Hou 1987; Branchiocaris malongensis Luo et al. 2008; Branchiocaris xundianensis Luo et al. 2008; Branchiocaris yiliangensis Luo et al. 2008

= Branchiocaris =

Branchiocaris Temporal range: Middle Cambrian 518–508 Ma

Genus of crustaceans

Branchiocaris is an extinct genus of Cambrian bivalved arthropod. The type and best known species, Branchiocaris pretiosa, was described from the Burgess Shale of British Columbia, Canada, in 1929, originally placed in Protocaris, and was placed into its own distinct genus by Briggs in 1976. Several other possible species have been described from Cambrian deposits in China, and it is also possibly known from Cambrian deposits in Utah.

== Description ==
Branchiocaris pretiosa is around 80–90 millimetres (3.1–3.5 in) in length, with a highly segmented trunk, consisting of at least 44 ring-like segments, terminating in a forked tail telson. At the front of the animal is a pair of short segmented tapered antennules with at least 20 segments, as well as a pair of claw appendages. It was likely an active swimmer, and used the claw appendages to bring food to the mouth.

== Taxonomy ==
The discovery of Tokummia from the Burgess Shale, believed to be a close relative of Branchiocaris, has shed light on the evolutionary placement of Branchiocaris. The authors find both species to be arthropods at a stem position within Mandibulata, as part of the clade Hymenocarina. This is in part based on the clear presence of mandibles, characteristic of all mandibulates.

Cladogram of Hymenocarina, following Izquierdo-López and Caron, (2024):

- - Hymenocarina
    - - - Tuzoia
        - Perspicaris
      - - Pectocaris
        - Protocarididae
          - Loricicaris
          - - Tokummia
            - Branchiocaris
    - - - - Plenocaris
          - - Ercaicunia
            - Clypecaris
        - - Pauloterminus
          - - Canadaspis
            - - Waptia
              - Chuandianella
      - - Vermontcaris
        - Odaraiidae
          - Odaraia
          - - Jugatacaris
            - - - Fibulacaris
                - Pakucaris
              - - Balhuticaris
                - Nereocaris
