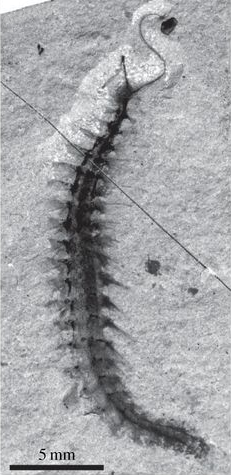
- Paratype specimen

Scientific classification
- Kingdom: Animalia
- Phylum: Annelida
- Genus: †Kootenayscolex; Nanglu & Caron, 2018
- Species: †K. barbarensis

Binomial name
- †Kootenayscolex barbarensis Nanglu & Caron, 2018

= Kootenayscolex =

Kootenayscolex Temporal range: Wuliuan, ~506.5–504.5 Ma

Extinct genus of annelid worms

Kootenayscolex is the extinct genus of annelid resembling a bristle worm, found in Burgess Shale, British Columbia. It appears to have been an aquatic worm with about 56 chaetae (bristles) on each of up to 25 segments, serving to propel it through mud or water.

The only one known species in the genus, Kootenayscolex barbarensis, is thought to exhibit primitive traits that show the foundation for the evolution of modern annelids, like "head" segment that still has traits of simply being another generic body segment, for example having bristles poking out of it, which no modern annelid shares.

== Description ==
The genus name Kootenascolex, means "worm from Kootenay National Park" (in British Columbia, where its fossils were found) and species name barbarensis is from Barbara Polk Milstein, a researcher on the Burgess Shale fossils. Over 500 specimen are known, and length ranges 1–30 mm (0.039–1.181 in). They appear to have been bottom feeders, sifting sediment from the seafloor in their mouths.
