= Caudal ramus =

Feature of crustaceans

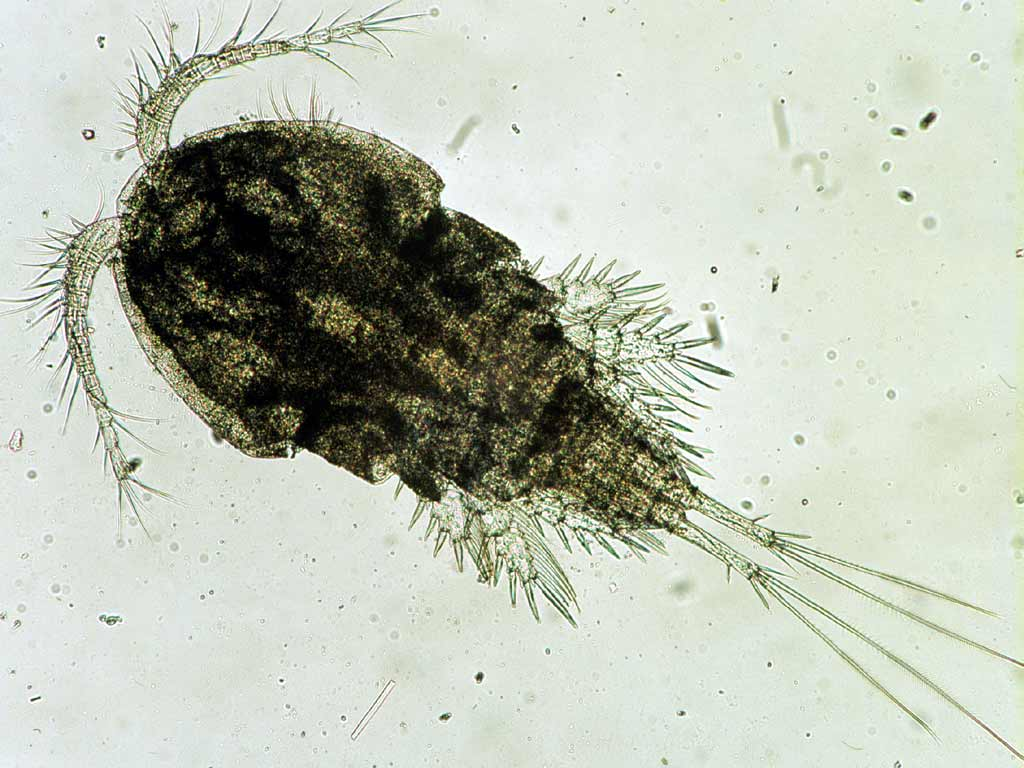
Cyclops (Maxillopoda: Copepoda), showing the caudal rami (bottom right)

The caudal ramus (plural: caudal rami) is a characteristic feature of primitive crustaceans. Located on the anal somite (telson segment), the caudal ramus is a pair of appendage-like or spine-like protrusions. Specific structures which are rod or blade-like are referred to as caudal furca (cf. telson).
