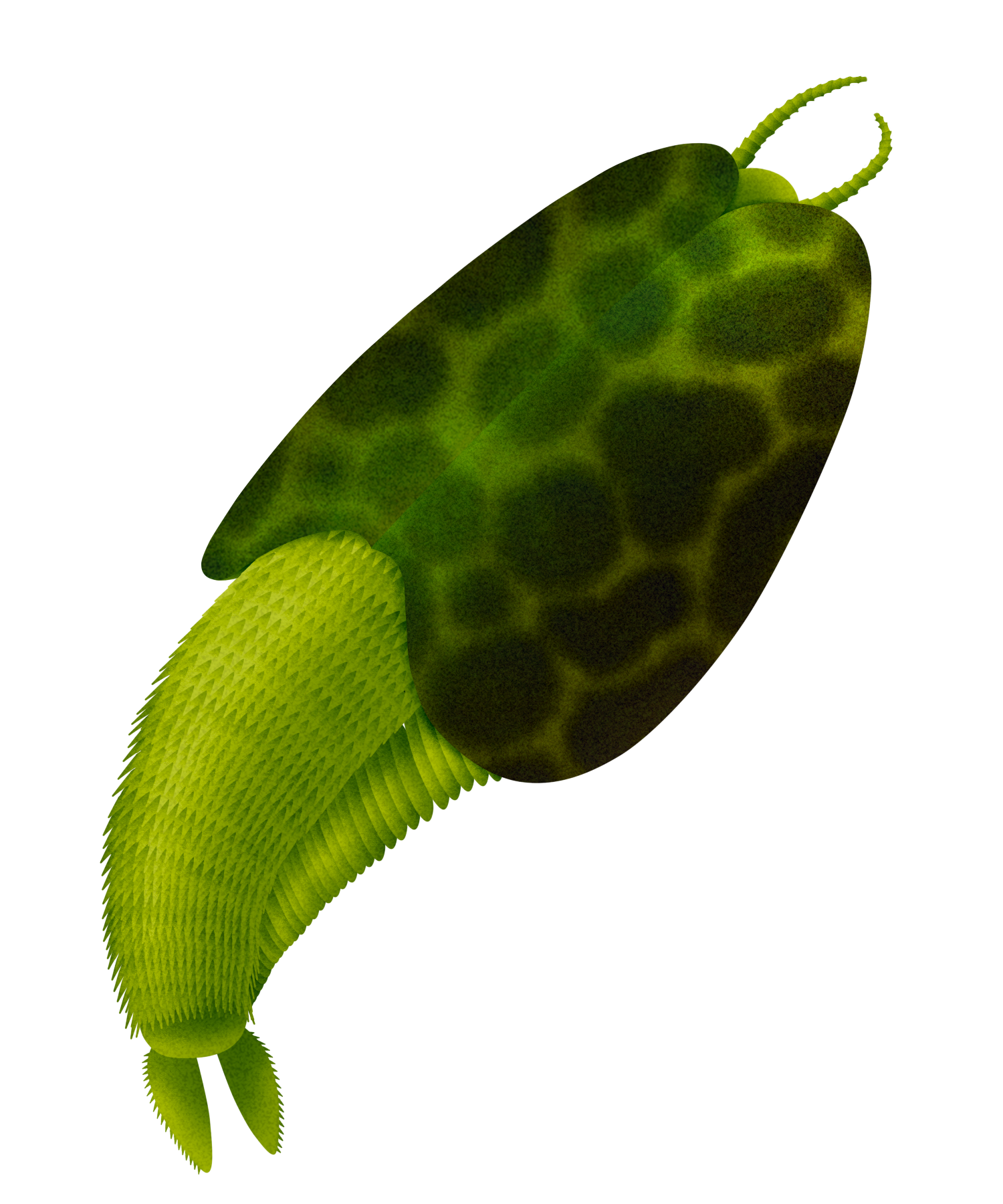
- Life restoration

Scientific classification
- Kingdom: Animalia
- Phylum: Arthropoda
- Order: †Hymenocarina
- Family: †Protocarididae
- Genus: †Loricicaris; Legg & Caron, 2013

Type species
- †Loricicaris spinocaudatus Legg & Caron, 2013

= Loricicaris =

Loricicaris Temporal range: Cambrian, 506 Ma

Extinct genus of arthropods

Loricicaris is a genus of extinct hymenocarine arthropod with a single species, Loricicaris spinocaudatus from the Burgess Shale, British Columbia, Canada described in 2013.

== Description ==
The longest individuals reach around 4.1 centimetres (1.6 in) in length. The front of the body was covered in a convex bivalved carapace which enveloped around 65% of the total body length. The head bore a pair of robust antennae, which was made up of at least 10 segments/podomeres, with the antennae segments bearing setae (hair-like structures). The head possibly bore a pair of stalked eyes. The head morphology is poorly known, but may have been made up of at minimum three segments with an anterior sclerite, whether a hypostome was present is unclear. The head also bore a pair of grasping appendages similar in morphology to those of Branchiocaris. Running through the body was a straight gut tube. The body was made up of somites/segments, of which 14-16 pairs were present under the carapace and 32 pairs ran behind the carpace. Running along the body were pairs of uniramous (single branched) appendages, which were only made up of exopods (the outer branch of a typical biramous/two branched arthropod limb), these changed in morphology from being roughly triangular flaps to being filamented rods towards the posterior of the animal. The body ended with a pair of telson spines, which were themselves covered in fine spines.

== Taxonomy ==
Remains of the species were originally attributed to Branchiocaris, to which Loricicaris is thought to be closely related. Both of these genera are now placed in Protocarididae, alongside Tokummia and Protocaris. Protocarididae has been placed as part of Hymenocarina along with many other bivalved arthropods.
