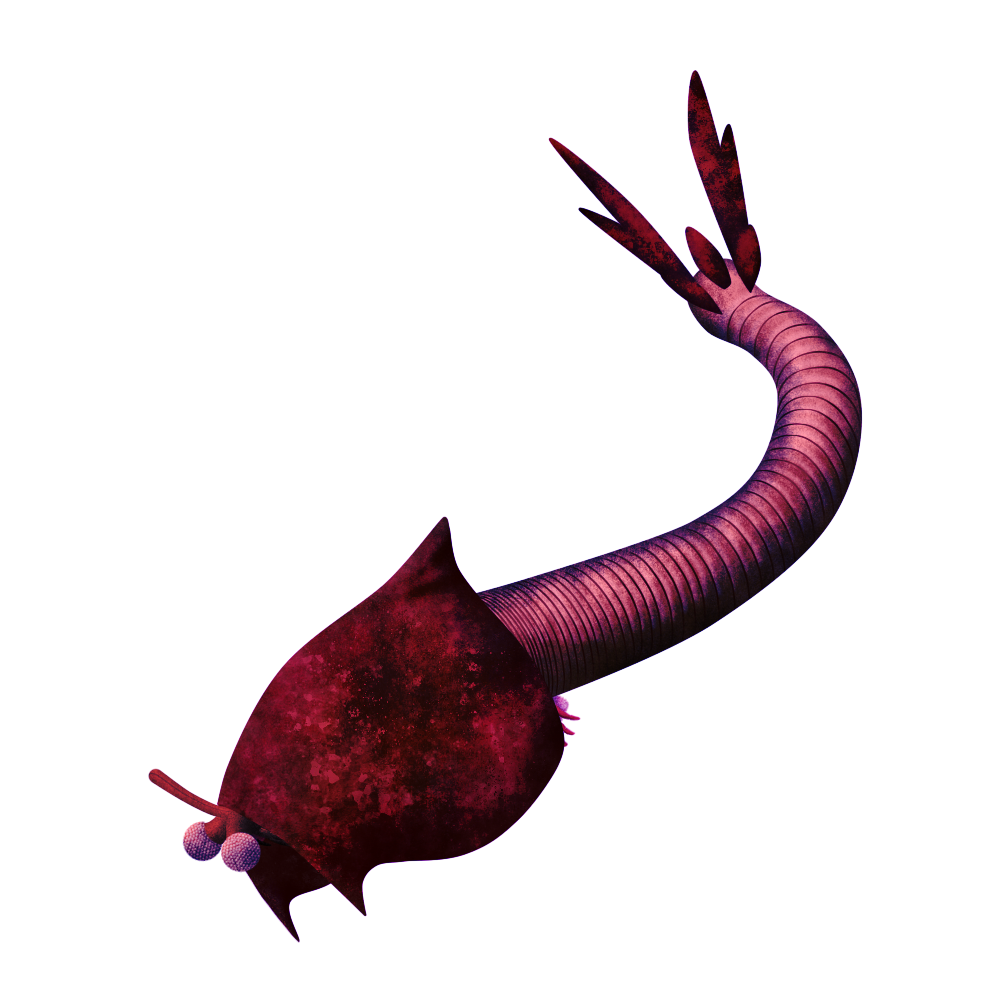
- Artistic reconstruction of Nereocaris exilis

Scientific classification
- Kingdom: Animalia
- Phylum: Arthropoda
- Order: †Hymenocarina
- Genus: †Nereocaris; Legg et al. 2012

Species
- N. exilis Legg et al. 2012; N. briggsi Legg & Caron, 2013

= Nereocaris =

Nereocaris Temporal range: Wuliuan (Middle Cambrian), 508 Ma

Genus of bivalved hymenocarine arthropod

Nereocaris is an extinct genus of bivalved hymenocarine arthropod that lived in the Cambrian period and has been found in the Burgess Shale in what is now British Columbia around 506 million years ago. Two species are known.

== History and nomenclature ==
The holotype and paratype were found in the Burgess Shale Lagerstätte, in the Tulip Beds; it was later described in 2012, by Legg et al, as a basal hymenocarine, naming the type species Neroecaris exilis. In 2013, a second Nereocaris briggsi was described by Legg and Caron.

The generic name, Nereocaris comes from Greek: Nereo, Nereus the Greek god of waves; and caris, "shrimp" or "crab", meaning "Nereus's shrimp". The specific name exilis comes from Latin, meaning slim; while the second species' name briggsi means "of Briggs", referring to professor Derek Briggs, an expert on Cambrian arthropods.

== Description ==
According to the diagnosis of Legg and Caron (2013), the genus including both species is diagnosed by the presence of two lateral stalked eyes and one median eye, the possession of laterally compressed bivalved carapace with hook-like elements, and a telson with a triangular medial process and a three-segmented elongate lateral process. Nereocaris exilis was relatively large sized arthropod for the era, with the largest specimen measuring up to 142 millimetres (0.466 feet). They possessed a thick carapace covering the dorsal and lateral sides of the head. Their thorax was composed of 30-40 segments, each of them coming with a pair of legs. The shape of its armor made it so the legs had a very limited range of movement, barely being able to reach whatever was directly under them. The abdomen was composed of another 60 segments, finishing in a short telson with a pair of triangular flukes made up of three segments each.

== Classification ==
Legg et al. (2012) recovered it as a basal member of Hymenocarina, Izquierdo-López and Caron (2022) recovered both within Hymenocarina, but the genus was found to be non-monophyletic, with the two species found to be more closely related to other hymenocarines than they were to each other.
