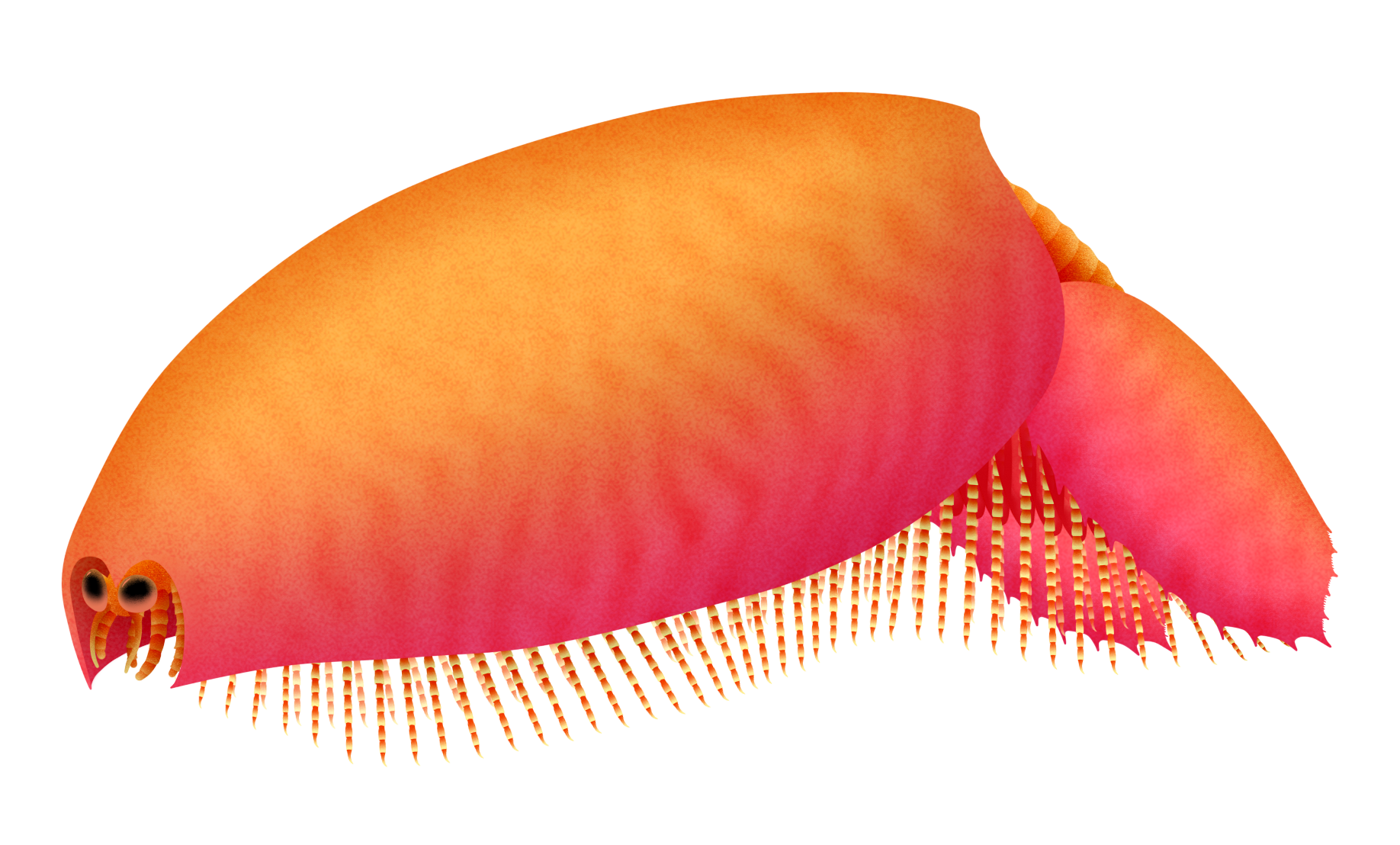
- Life restoration

Scientific classification
- Kingdom: Animalia
- Phylum: Arthropoda
- Order: †Hymenocarina
- Genus: †Pakucaris; Izquierdo-López & Caron, 2021
- Species: †P. apatis

Binomial name
- †Pakucaris apatis Izquierdo-López & Caron, 2021

= Pakucaris =

Pakucaris Temporal range: Miaolingian

Extinct genus of bivalved arthropod

Pakucaris is an extinct genus of bivalved arthropod known from a single species, Pakucaris apatis, found in the Marble Canyon locality of the Burgess Shale in British Columbia, Canada. It is thought to be a member of Hymenocarina. Unlike other members of that group, the posterior segments are covered with a separate pygidium shield, covergent on other arthropods like artiopods. Specimens range in length from 11.65 to 26.6 millimetres (0.459 to 1.047 in). The main bivalved carapace covers around 80% of the body, with the pygidium covering the remaining 20%. The head (cephalon) has a forward and downward facing pair of moderately sized eyes on short stalks, along with three pairs of attached appendages. The thorax had either 30-35 or 70-80 segments, depending on the specimen, while the pygidium had either 11-13 or 20 segments. The segments of the thorax and pygidium had pairs of thin filamentous biramous (two-branched) limbs, with the endopods (inner, leg-like branches) divided into 20/21 podomeres (segments), with paddle-like exopods (outer limb branches). It was probably nektobenthic (actively swimming close to the seafloor), and its ecology was likely that of a selective suspension feeder, using its limbs to scrape and/or suspend food particles from the sea floor, before using its limbs to capture and transfer them to the mouth.
