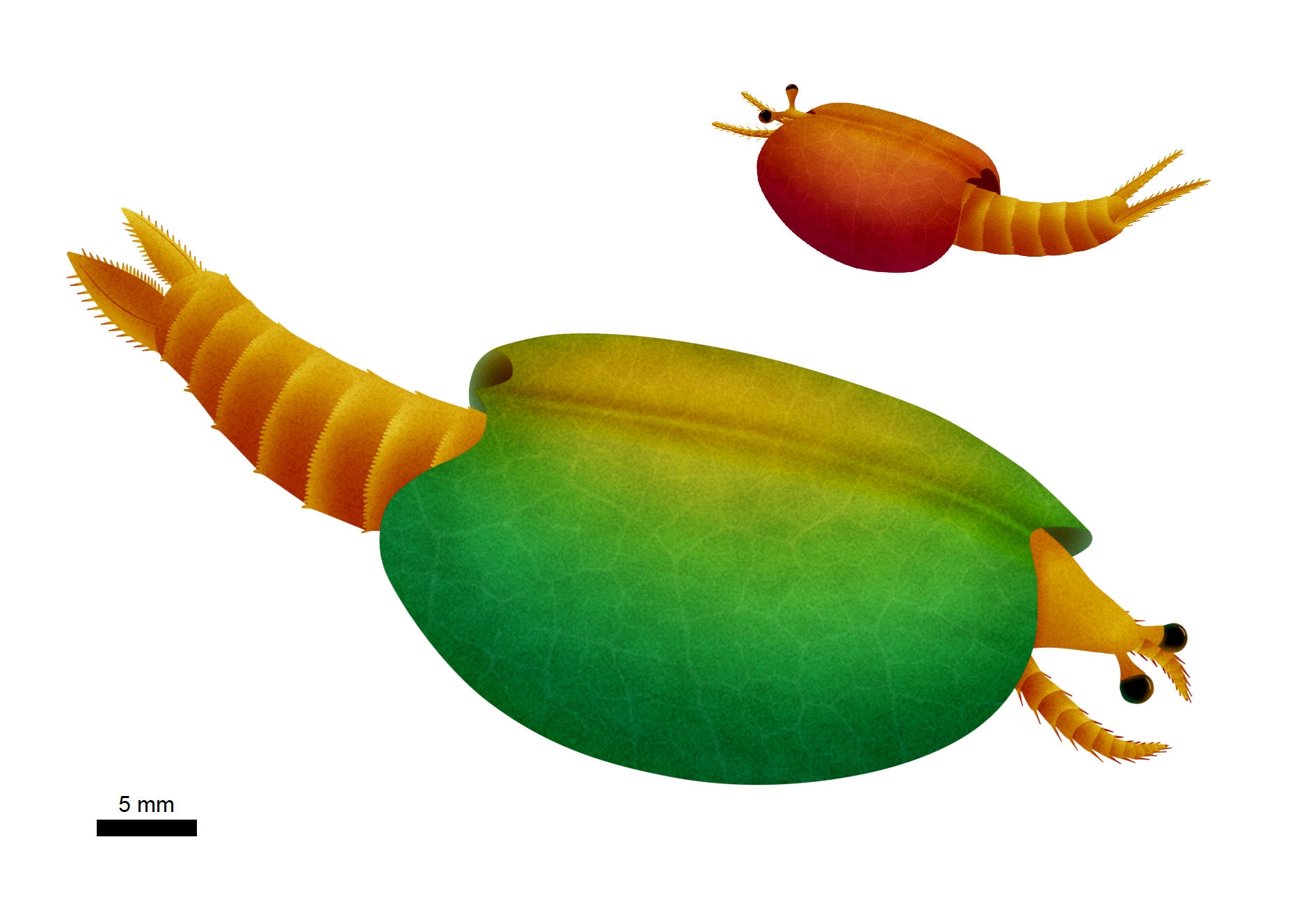
- Perspicaris dictynna (top) and Perspicaris. recondita (bottom) to scale. Scale bar = 5mm

Scientific classification
- Kingdom: Animalia
- Phylum: Arthropoda
- Genus: Perspicaris Briggs 1977

Species
- P. recondita Briggs 1977; P. dictynna (type species, =Canadaspis dictynna Simonetta & Delle Cave 1975)

= Perspicaris =

Perspicaris Temporal range: Miaolingian

Extinct genus of bivalved arthropod

Perspicaris (from the Latin perspicax, meaning “sharp-sighted,” and caris, “crab/shrimp”) an extinct genus of bivalved arthropod from the Cambrian period. Fossils have been found in North America, primarily the Burgess Shale of British Columbia, Canada but also possibly the Wheeler Shale, Marjum Formation, Pioche Shale and Bloomington Formation. Two named species are known from the Burgess Shale Perspicaris dictynna and Perspicaris recondita, which differ in maximum size (66 millimetres (2.6 in) in P. recondita vs 29 millimetres (1.1 in) in P. dictynna), as well as proportions of the tail. Both species have a pair of stalked eyes, as well as a pair of large segmented antennae. The tail is forked and spiny. They are thought to have been active swimmers (nektonic).

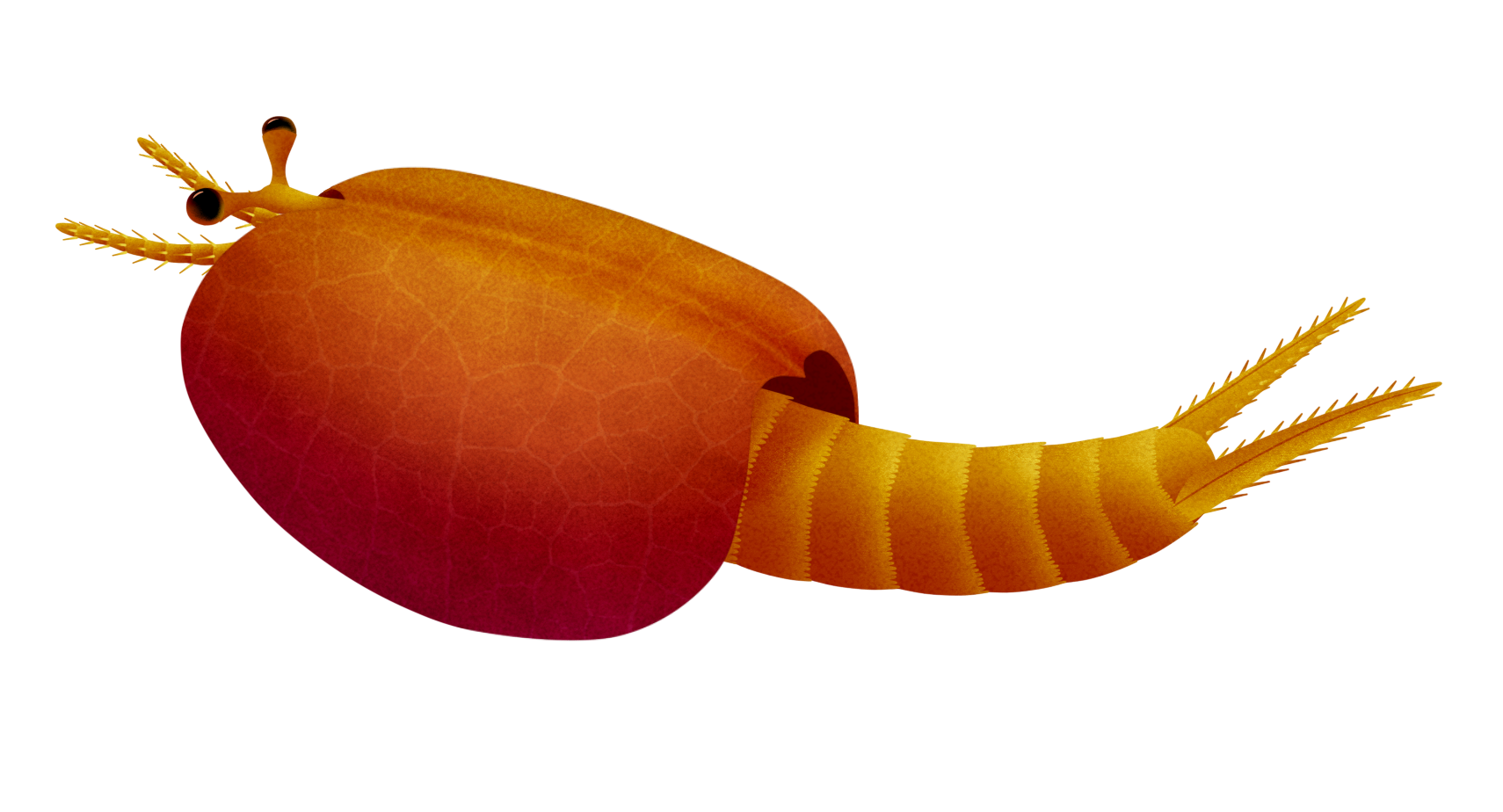
Restoration of P.dictynna

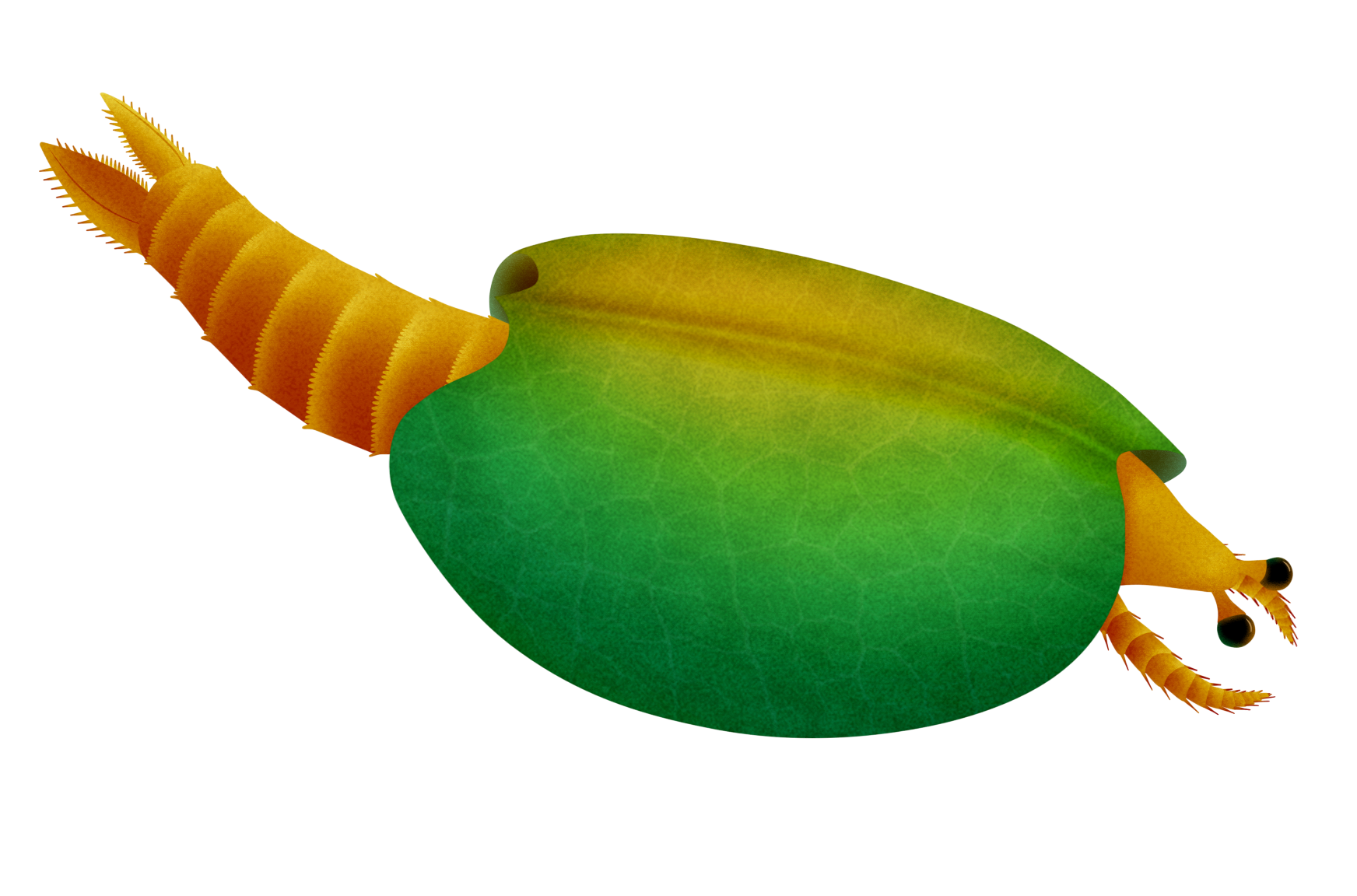
Restoration of P. recondita

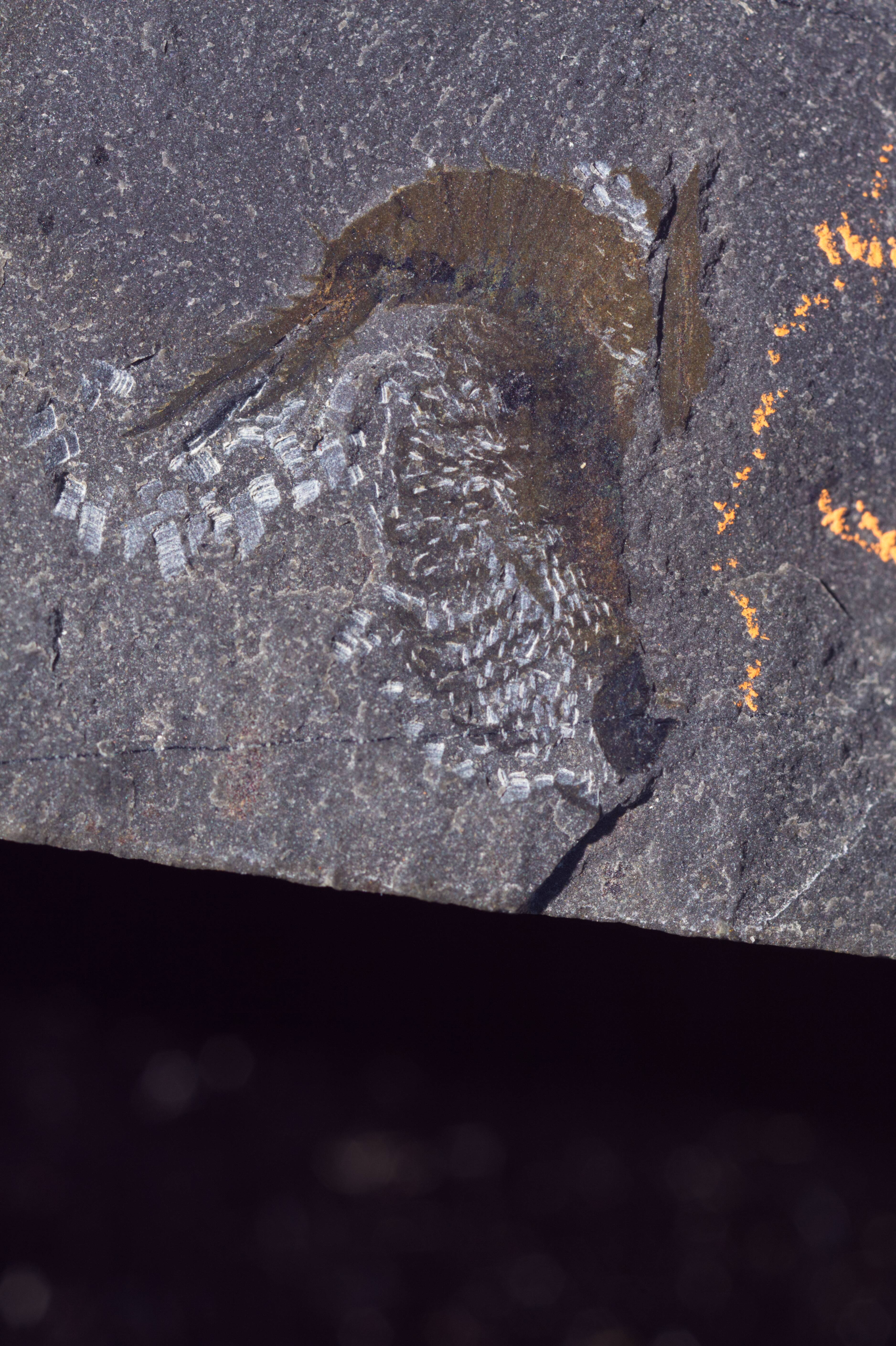
Holotype of P. dictynna

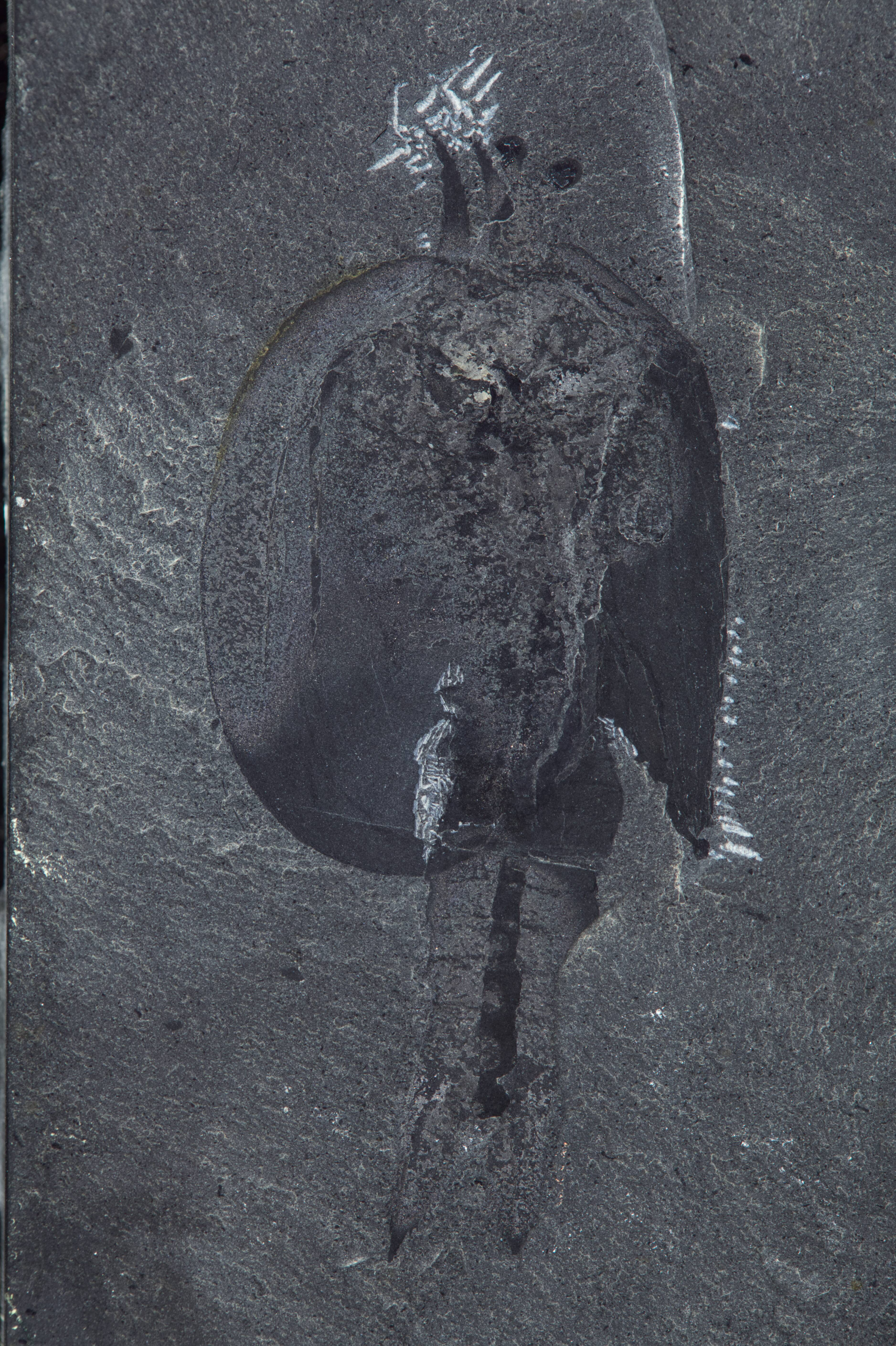
Holotype of P. recondita

Perspicaris has been identified as a member of a clade Hymenocarina close to the crown-group of Euarthropoda, which includes myriapods, chelicerates, insects and crustaceans.
