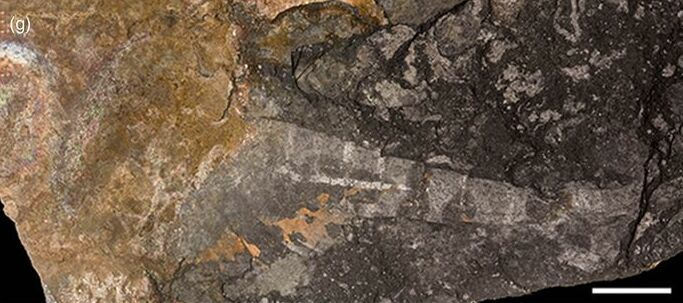
- Fossil of P. spinodorsalis
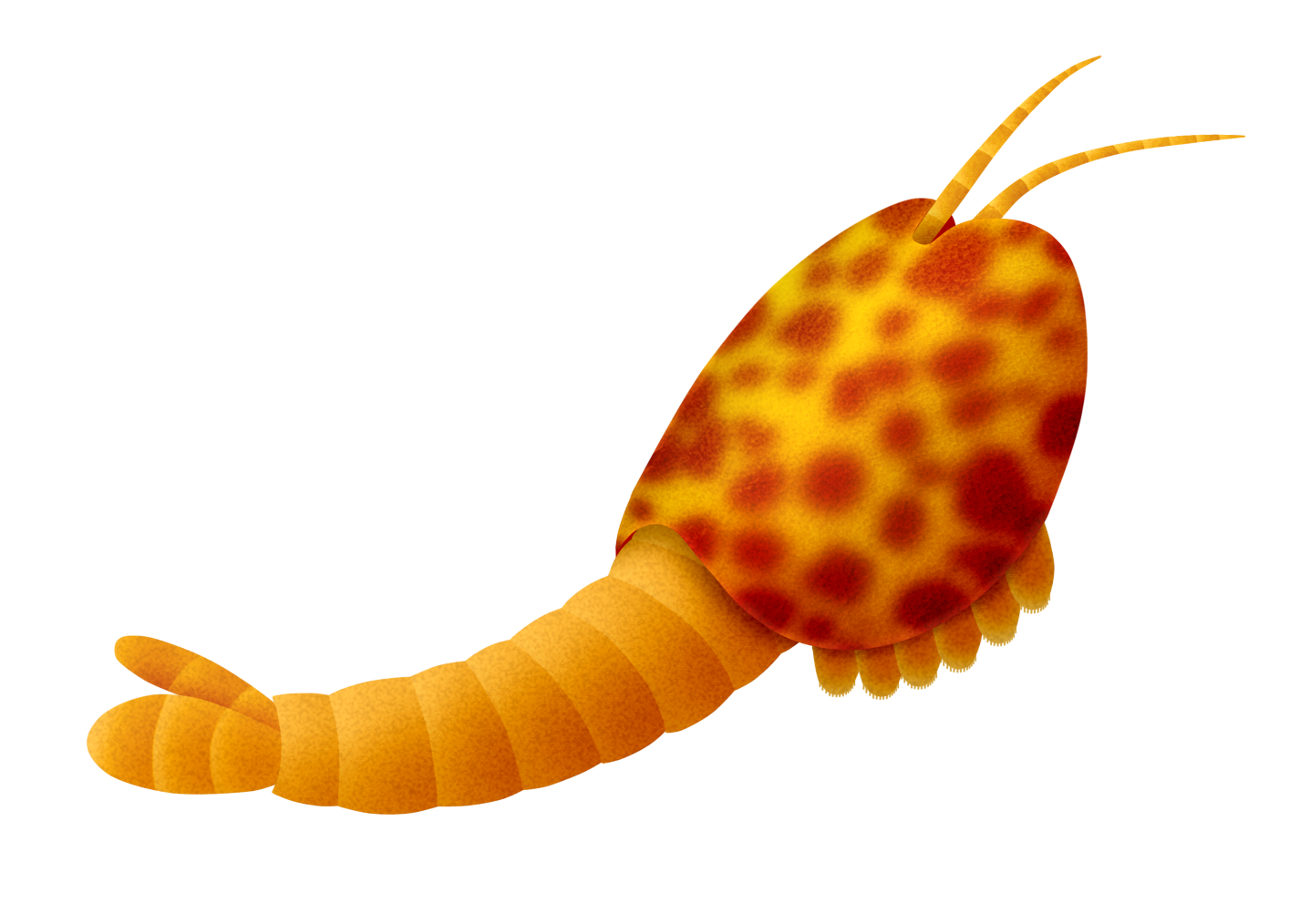
- Life restoration

Scientific classification
- Kingdom: Animalia
- Phylum: Arthropoda
- Order: †Hymenocarina
- Family: †Waptiidae
- Genus: †Pauloterminus; Taylor, 2002
- Species: †P. spinodorsalis

Binomial name
- †Pauloterminus spinodorsalis Taylor, 2002

= Pauloterminus =

Pauloterminus Temporal range: Atdabanian

Extinct shrimp-like stem group crustacean

Pauloterminus is an extinct genus of bivalved arthropod known from Early Cambrian (about 520 to 516 million years ago) Sirius Passet locality of northern Greenland. It is tentatively classified under the family Waptiidae.

The genus only has a single species P. spinodorsalis. It was first described by the paleontologist Rod S. Taylor in 2002. Its generic name is derived from Latin paulus ("small") and terminus ("end"). The specific name is from Latin spina ("thorn") and dorsalis ("of the back").

== Description ==
The ovoid-shaped bivalved carapace encloses the head and the anterior (frontmost) section of the trunk. The carapace is slightly less than twice as long as it is tall, and becomes wider posteriorly. The largest known carapace is 49.5 millimetres (1.95 in) long and 30 millimetres (1.2 in) wide, while in the smallest known specimens it is less than 1 centimetre (0.39 in) in length. The head is poorly known, though it is suggested that they lacked eyes. One specimen has partially preserved pair of segmented antennae, which have at least 4 segments, which decrease in length towards the end of the antenna. The thorax was likely tube shaped, and had six segments, each associated with a pair of biramous (two-branched) limbs, which decrease in size posteriorly. The limb endopods (the inner, leg-like branch) are thin and annulate, and approximately 1 millimetre (3/64 in) in width, while the exopods (outer limb branches) were lobe-shaped and bore setae (hair-like structures). The abdomen was limbless and had five segments, and terminated in a pair of segmented caudal flukes.

== Taxonomy ==
In its original description, Pauloterminus was noted to be morphologically similar to Waptia and Chuandianella, both historically considered "waptiids", but it is unclear whether the group is monophyletic.
