= History of the Burgess Shale =

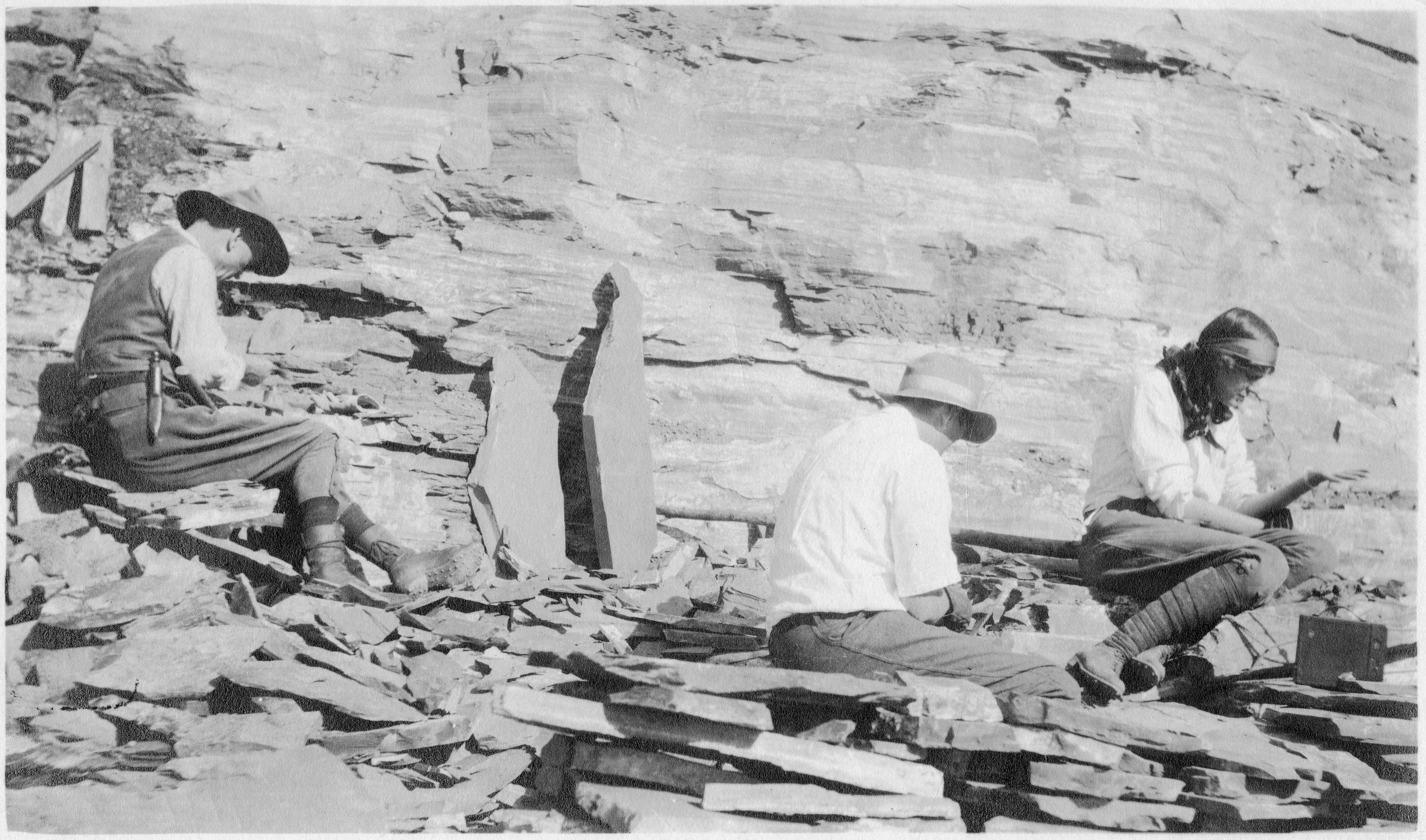
Walcott, his son Sidney, and daughter Helen collecting from the Walcott Quarry, 1913

The Burgess Shale, a series of fossil beds in the Canadian Rockies, was first noticed in 1886 by Richard McConnell of the Geological Survey of Canada (GSC). His and subsequent finds, all from the Mount Stephen area, came to the attention of palaeontologist Charles Doolittle Walcott, who in 1907 found time to reconnoitre the area. He opened a quarry in 1910 and in a series of field trips brought back 65,000 specimens, which he identified as Middle Cambrian in age. Due to the quantity of fossils and the pressures of his other duties at the Smithsonian Institution, Walcott was only able to publish a series of "preliminary" papers, in which he classified the fossils within taxa that were already established. In a series of visits beginning in 1924, Harvard University professor Percy Raymond collected further fossils from Walcott's quarry and higher up on Fossil Ridge, where slightly different fossils were preserved.

Interest in the area's fossil beds faded after Raymond's 1930s expeditions. In the early 1960s Harry B. Whittington was persuaded that further investigation was required, and organised surveys in partnership with the Geological Survey of Canada. These new specimens led him to set up a team to re-examine Walcott's fossils, which had languished in a store-room at the Smithsonian since Walcott's death in 1927. In the early 1970s the team published papers that diagnosed many of the specimens as fossils of previously unknown types of animals, some possibly belonging to new phyla. These analyses heightened interest in the existing debate about whether the Cambrian explosion represented a truly abrupt evolution of recognisable animals or was the result of a longer development, most of which was hidden by gaps in the known sets of fossils that had been found.

All this time no Canadian museum had its own collection of Burgess Shale fossils. In 1975 the Royal Ontario Museum (ROM) began collecting, found 7,750 new specimens around the existing sites, and discovered similar fossil beds up to 40 kilometres (25 mi) away. Their collection currently stands at 140,000 specimens and growing, and the rate at which new species are found suggests that the Burgess Shale will continue to produce important discoveries for the foreseeable future.

== Early forays ==
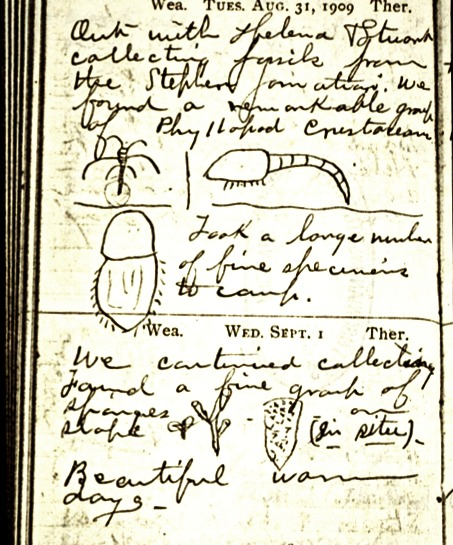
A page of Walcott's field notebook, depicting some familiar fossils from the Phyllopod bed

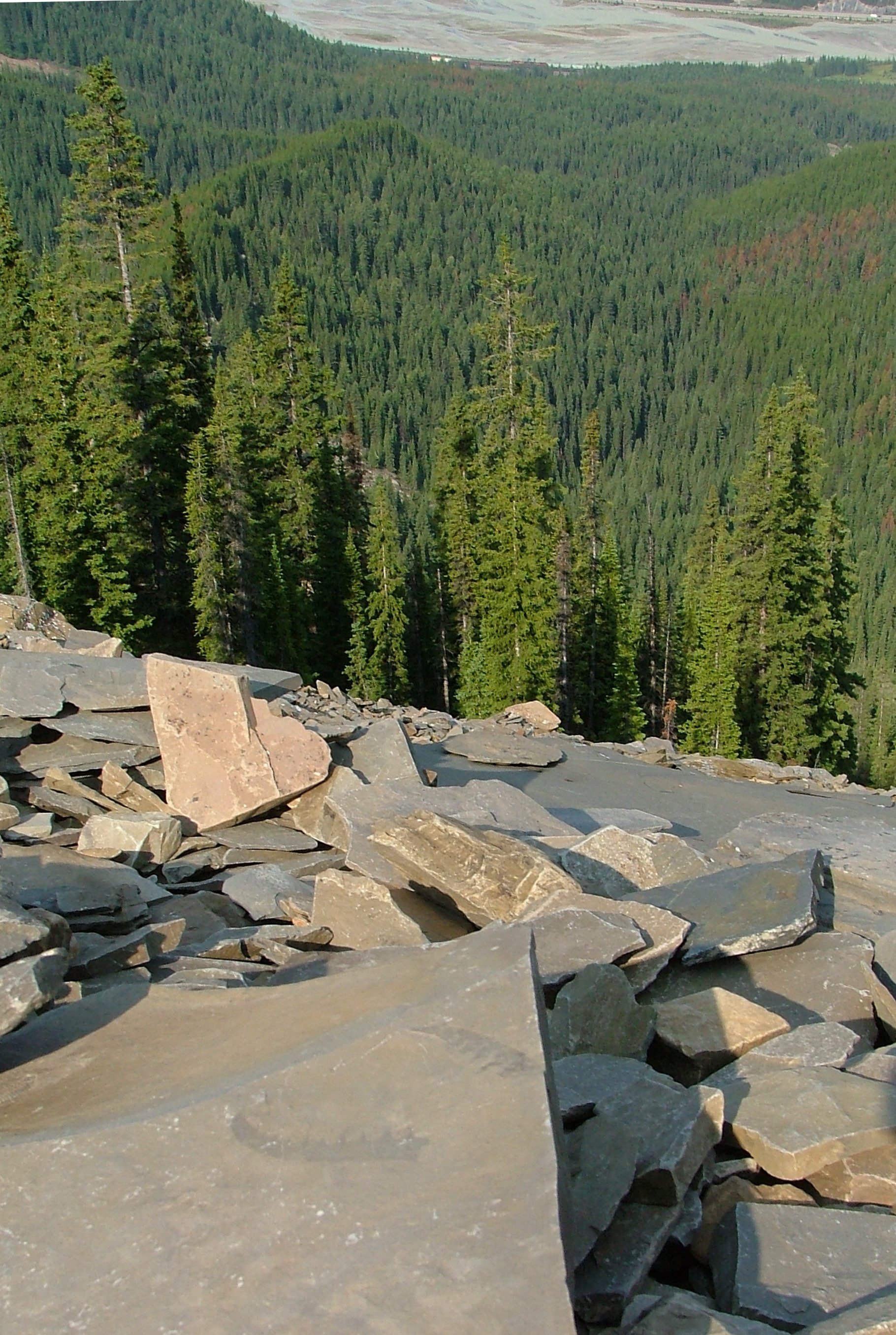
The view from the Mount Stephen trilobite beds, with anomalocaridid claws visible on a slab in the foreground, the Canadian Pacific Railway is visible in the distance.

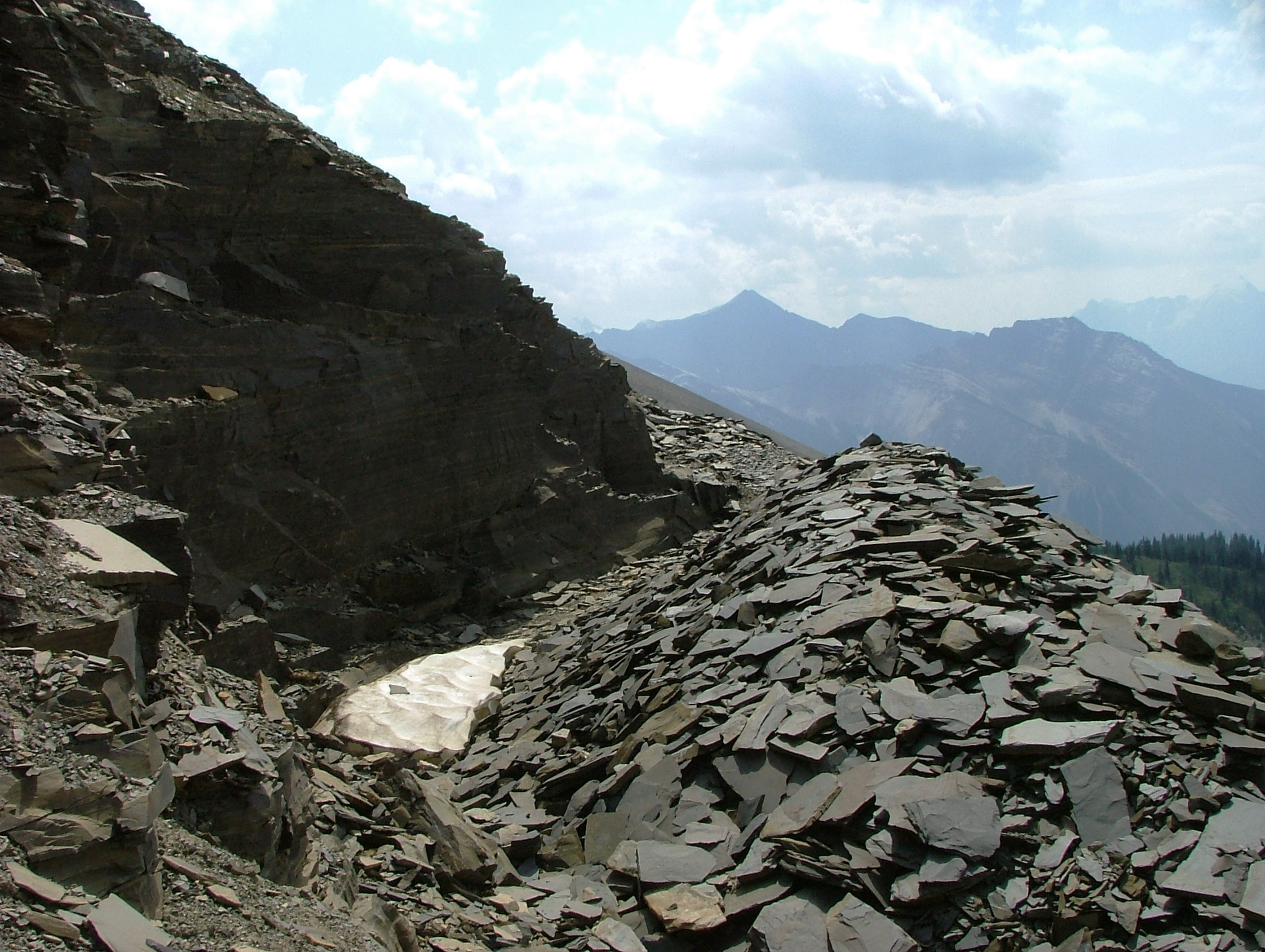
Percy Raymond's Quarry. The quarry was back-filled by Royal Ontario Museum collection teams in the 1980s, producing the row of discarded slabs seen on the right of the image.

The richness of fossils in the Field area was first identified by workers associated with the construction of the Trans-Canada railway, which had (somewhat controversially) been routed through the Kicking Horse valley. Richard McConnell, of the Geological Survey of Canada, was mapping the geology around the railway line in September 1886, and was pointed to the Mount Stephen trilobite beds by a construction worker. Several unusual fossils were subsequently described from this site, including sponges, worms, and the appendages of the unusual Anomalocaris, identified at that time as the bodies of crabs. Some of these fossils found their way to Charles Doolittle Walcott, who described them and correctly estimated their Middle Cambrian age. These fossils whetted Walcott's appetite for the region, but it was not until 1907 that the opportunity arose for him to visit Mount Stephen in person.

1908 saw a rich crop of publications as Walcott worked on the material he had collected the previous year, and towards the end of August 1909 he returned to the Field area. That summer, Walcott had visited England to participate in the celebration of Darwin's centenary. Whilst there, he had met the Natural History Museum curator Henry Woodward, who had suggested that the nearby Mount Field may yield further fossils of the ilk of the Trilobite beds. Promptly upon his arrival in Field, Walcott ascended the slopes of Mount Field via Burgess Pass. This pass, probably one of the many constructed by the CPR in an effort to attract tourists, led along what is now called Fossil Ridge. Walcott recognised the talus material which lay across the trail as the Stephen Formation, and noticed interesting fossils. This find is often considered to be the first discovery of the Burgess Shale 'proper'. He spent several more days collecting on Fossil Ridge before returning to Mount Stephen to bolster his collections from the Trilobite Beds.

The subsequent year saw more intensive collecting by Walcott. He and his two sons systematically investigated every stratum of rock to locate the source of the block they had found the previous summer. They eventually identified the productive layers, including the Phyllopod bed, in what would become the Walcott Quarry. They began to excavate this outcrop, sending blocks by pack horse to Walcott's wife, who split the shale and prepared fossils for transportation downhill to Field, and onwards by rail to Washington. While reporting his finds in the following year, Walcott first coined the term 'Burgess Shale', proposing it to form a facies within the Stephen Formation. These reports covered many now-familiar animal genera, although few of Walcott's proposed classifications would stand the test of time; they were also Walcott's final publications on Burgess Shale animals.

Walcott and his family returned to the quarry each summer until 1913, using dynamite as surface collection dried up. During this time, his wife died in a train crash and his eldest son died of tuberculosis. He considered his next trip, in 1917, to have "practically exhausted" the quarry, with 1300 kg of material being collected that year. He returned to take additional collections, mainly from talus material, in 1919, 1921, and 1924, amassing a total of 65,000 fossil specimens over 30,000 slabs. During these years, he made further preliminary descriptions of the less glamorous sponges and algae. He photographed and clearly intended to describe many further taxa, many of which sat alone with their photograph in a Smithsonian drawer for decades after Walcott's death. Unfortunately, administrative duties became a growing burden on Walcott's time, and the Burgess took a back seat to the completion of his attempts to document the stratigraphy of the southern Rockies, an extensive work which he did not live to see published.

Three years before Walcott died in 1927, the Harvard University professor Percy Raymond led a group of summer-school students to Walcott's camp and quarry. These field trips became a regular fixture, and Raymond's interest in the fossils led him to obtain permission to re-open the quarry. He also determined that a level slightly further up-slope, recognised but not exploited by Walcott, bore a slightly different fauna, and opened a new quarry – now termed the Raymond Quarry – at this level.

== Renewed interest ==
After Raymond's few excursions, the Burgess Shale faded somewhat into obscurity. Walcott's third wife, Mary Vaux, discouraged access to the collections, which gathered dust on high shelves in the Smithsonian Institution. Harry Whittington, then of Harvard University, was to prove the catalyst that renewed interest in the site. As he showed a visiting trilobite expert around Raymond's collections, the necessity of a restudy was pointed out to Whittington, who proceeded to lobby the Geological Survey of Canada (GSC) to revisit the locality. They did, and as a leading authority on trilobites, Whittington was the logical choice to head the palaeontological investigations in the arthropod-rich Shale. In the company of Jim Aitken and Bill Fritz, he led a GSC reconnaissance expedition in 1966; fellow trilobitologist David Bruton joined the crew the next year as they went out to quarry in force. Dynamite was used in only the smallest quantities, with closely spaced drill holes used to separate large blocks of rock, and large slabs were collected systematically from the Walcott and Raymond quarries. These were labelled with their stratigraphic level, helicoptered from the mountain face, and returned to Whittington's base at the Sedgwick Museum in Cambridge for further study. The 1967 operation resulted in the description of new animals, including the earliest known crinoid and a complete Anomalocaris. Initially, detailed descriptions were made of some of the most common arthropod-like organisms: Marrella, Sidneyia and Burgessia. These redescriptions were slow and laborious, making extensive use of the camera lucida technique for microscope drawing, with papers based extensively around detailed drawing of the fossil specimens. It soon became clear that the Burgess Shale was even more exceptional than previously thought – soft tissue was preserved to an exquisite quality, allowing insights into early life that had never before been dreamed of, and preserving a range of non-mineralising taxa which are otherwise invisible in the fossil record. With an overwhelmingly diverse fauna in need of cataloguing, Harry Whittington set his two new graduate students to the task, assigning Derek Briggs and Simon Conway Morris the arthropods and 'worms', respectively. This work began to lift the veil on an unexpectedly diverse ecosystem, with almost as much variety as seen in the modern oceans – the old theory that Cambrian life was simple, straightforward and slightly dull disintegrated further with each new fossil described. This view was reinforced with the identification of other Burgess Shale-type deposits elsewhere in the world, a search for which was triggered by the discovery of the Chengjiang and Sirius Passet lagerstätten in 1984.

In February 2014, the discovery was announced of another Burgess Shale outcrop in Kootenay National Park to the south. In just 15 days of field collecting in 2013, 50 animal species were unearthed at the new site.

== Canadian collections ==
Until 1975, no Canadian museum had its own collection of Burgess Shale fossils. With the work of the GSC and its associates, the shale was rising to prominence, and in 1975 the Royal Ontario Museum (ROM) obtained permission from the National Parks authority, Parks Canada, to collect fossils from talus material in order to develop its own display. Parks Canada would redirect other museums' requests for material to the ROM, so the 1975 collection team gathered ample specimens to meet the anticipated teaching and display requirements. As well as 7750 specimens, this expedition yielded evidence that further fossil outcrops existed up-slope, and in 1981 a five-year reconnaissance program begun. This program would unearth further sites higher on Fossil Ridge; further around the steep cliffs of Mount Stephen; and on Odaray Mountain. These sites proved very productive, bearing a different fauna and spanning more time than the original beds. Excavation by ROM crews continues to this day, and has found fossils below the base of Walcott's quarry, and some 40 km away near the Stanley Glacier. The ROM's collections now stand proud of 140,000 specimens, and is continually yielding important new species and redescriptions. Statistical analysis suggests that new species will continue to be discovered for years to come.

== Protection ==
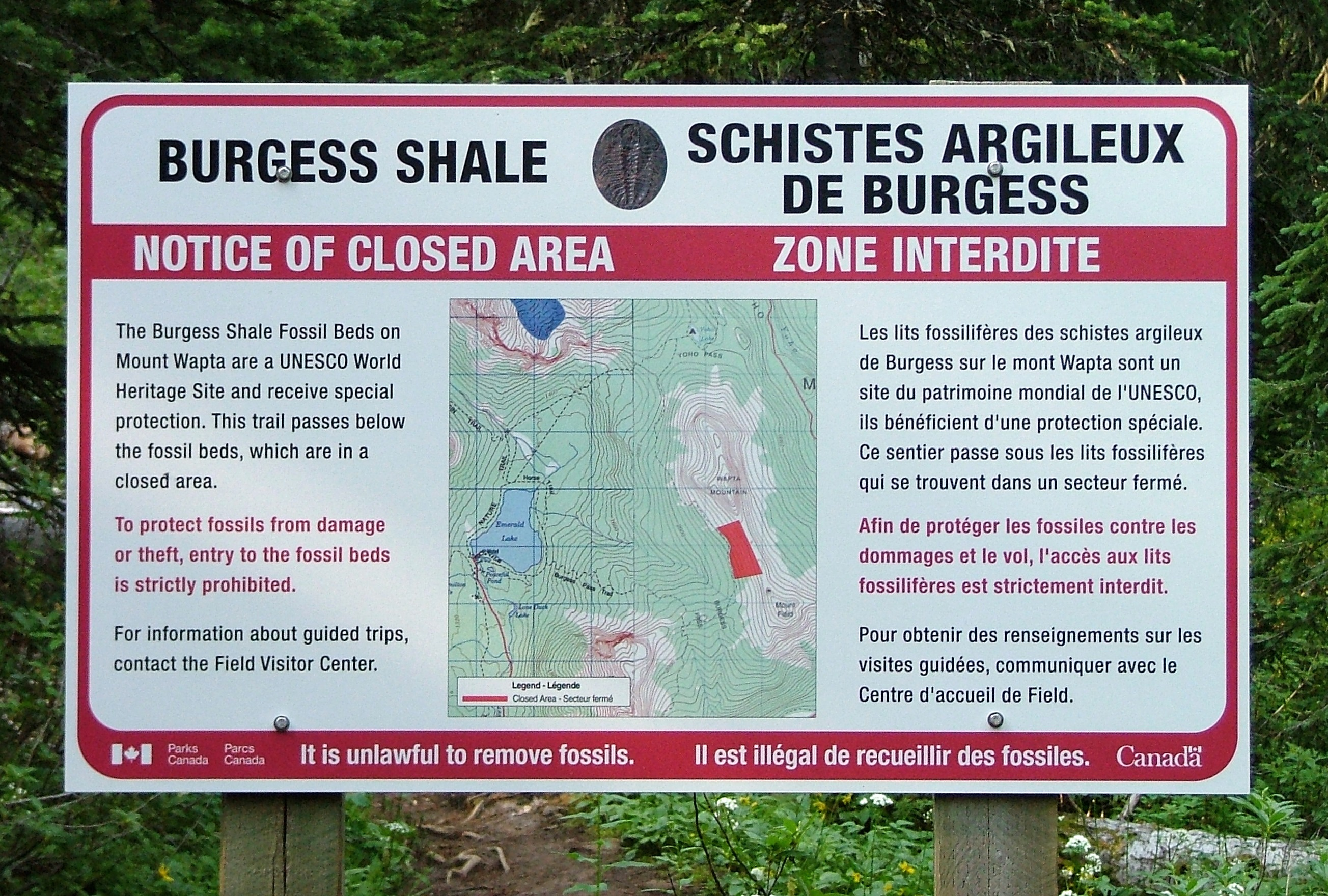
The historic Burgess Shale sites are now restricted areas.

In 1981, UNESCO recognised the importance of the Burgess Shale by naming it a World Heritage Site. Access to the Fossil Ridge quarries and Trilobite beds is now possible only as part of a guided group, and the sites are under continuous surveillance by Parks Canada, with hefty fines for removing or defacing fossil material.

== Centenary ==
To mark the hundredth anniversary of Walcott's discovery of the main Burgess Shale site on Fossil Ridge, an international conference of 150 specialists in the field was held in Banff, Alberta, in August 2009. It featured technical and keynote sessions reporting on the latest research in the field, and field hikes to the Shale itself.
