= Walcott Quarry =

Quarry in British Columbia, Canada

Coordinates: 51.4388°N 116.4714°W

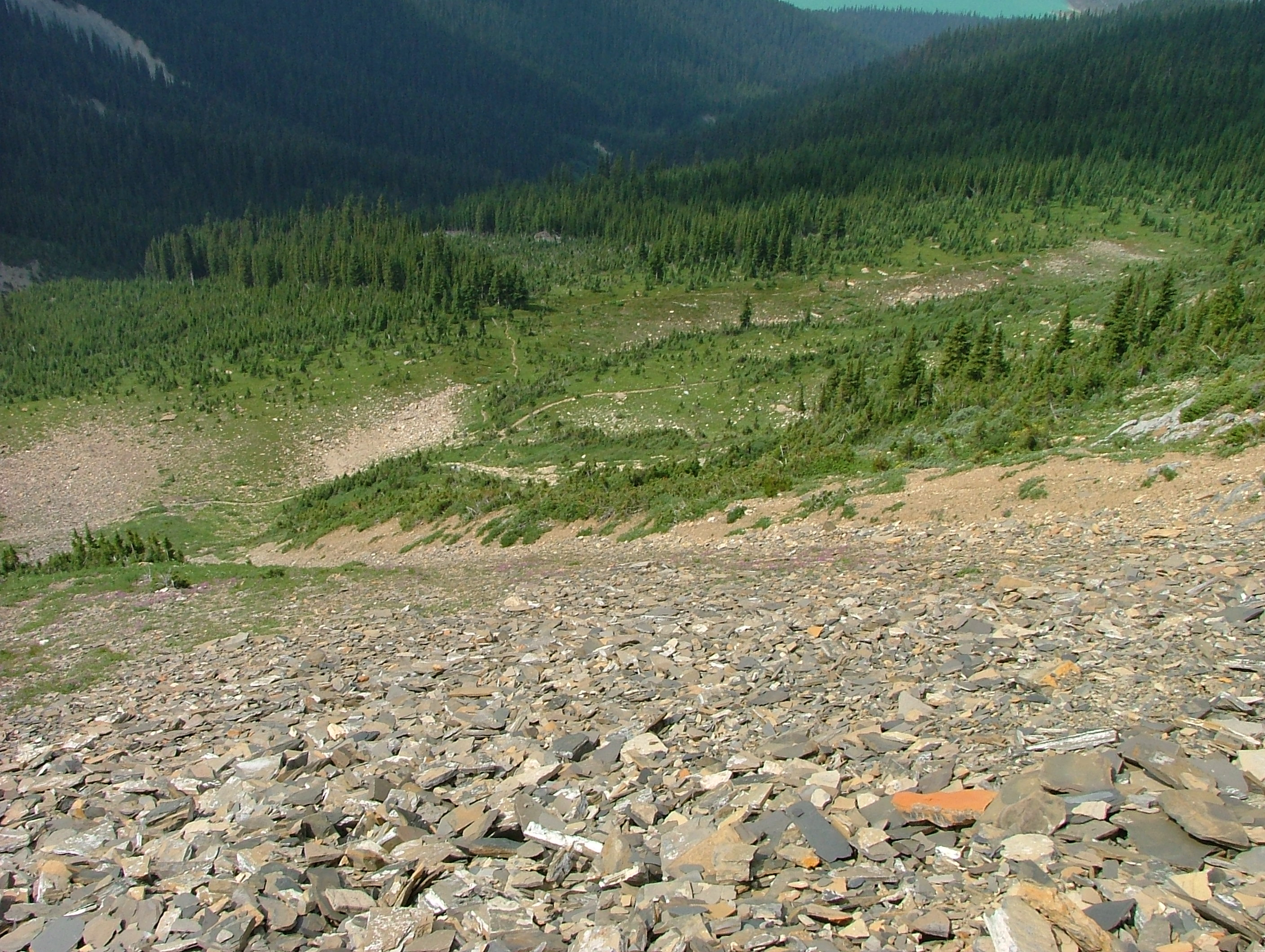
Talus material discarded during quarrying of the shale litters the side of Fossil Ridge. X marks the camp site used by field teams. Emerald Lake (EL) is visible in the background.

The Walcott Quarry is the most famous quarry of the Middle Cambrian Burgess Shale, located in the Canadian Rockies of British Columbia, bearing the Phyllopod beds. This lies at the base of the Walcott Quarry member, on a ridge between Wapta Mountain and Mount Field, and three other quarries – the Raymond, UE and EZ – lie above it. The quarry's proximity to the Cathedral escarpment led to the preservation of spectacular fossils.

Map of the Burgess Shale (Stephen Formation), as well as the Mount Whyte Formation. Major Localities within the shale are shown.

== History ==
After locating soft-bodied fossils in loose fragments of rock in 1907, the Phyllopod bed was located as a source for the fragments' origins by the Walcotts in 1910. The Walcott quarry was opened the subsequent year, and extensive quarrying was performed in field seasons until 1913, and Walcott considered the ton of shale he collected in his next visit, in 1917, to have practically exhausted the productive potential of the bed.

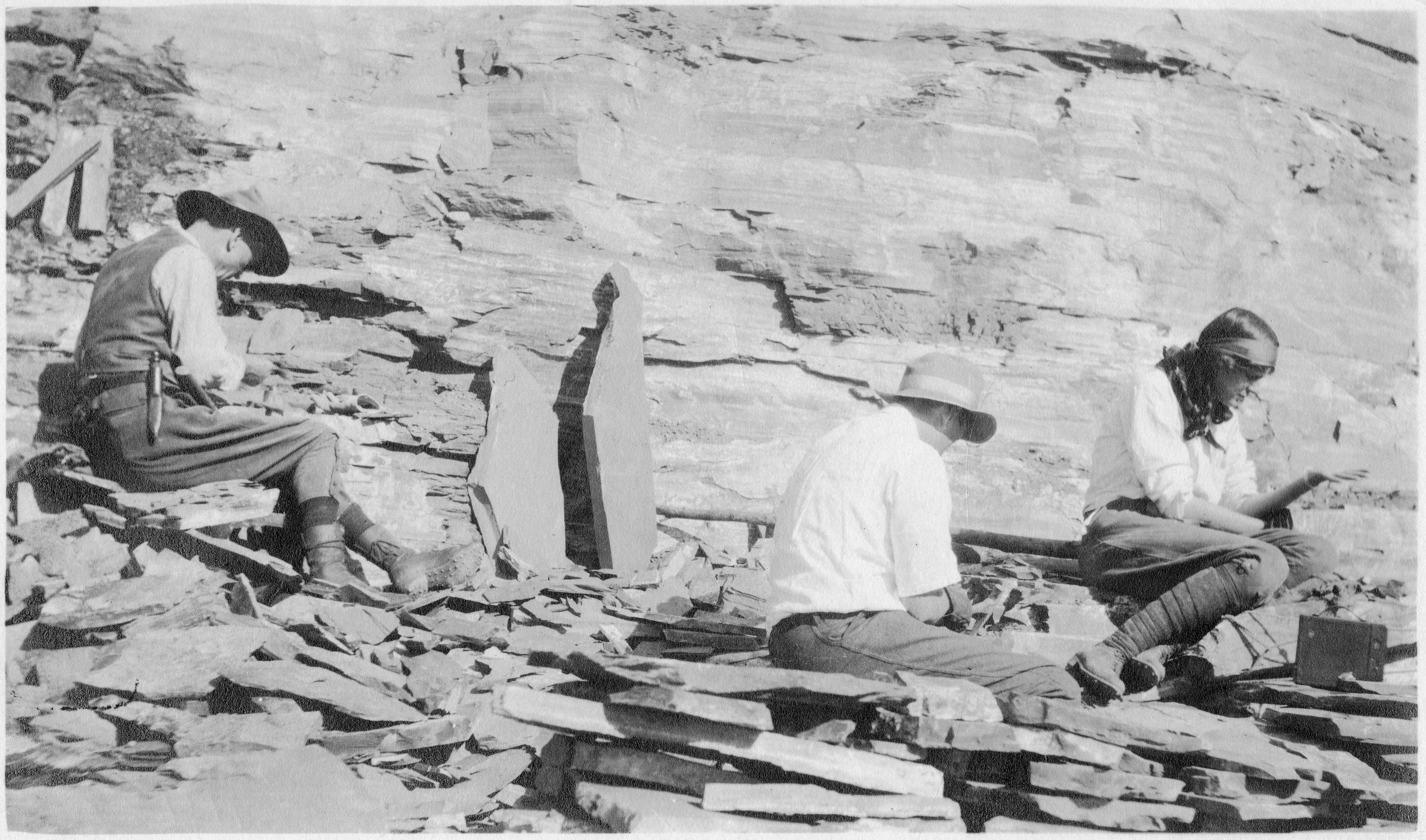
Walcott and his team collecting from the Phyllopod bed, c. 1913
