= Phyllopod bed =

Fossil-bearing member

Coordinates: 51.440°N 116.470°W

The Phyllopod bed, designated by USNM locality number 35k, is the most famous fossil-bearing member of the Burgess Shale fossil Lagerstätte. It was quarried by Charles Walcott from 1911 to 1917 (and later named Walcott Quarry) and was the source of 95% of the fossils he collected during this time; tens of thousands of soft-bodied fossils representing over 150 genera have been recovered from the Phyllopod bed alone.

== Stratigraphy and location ==
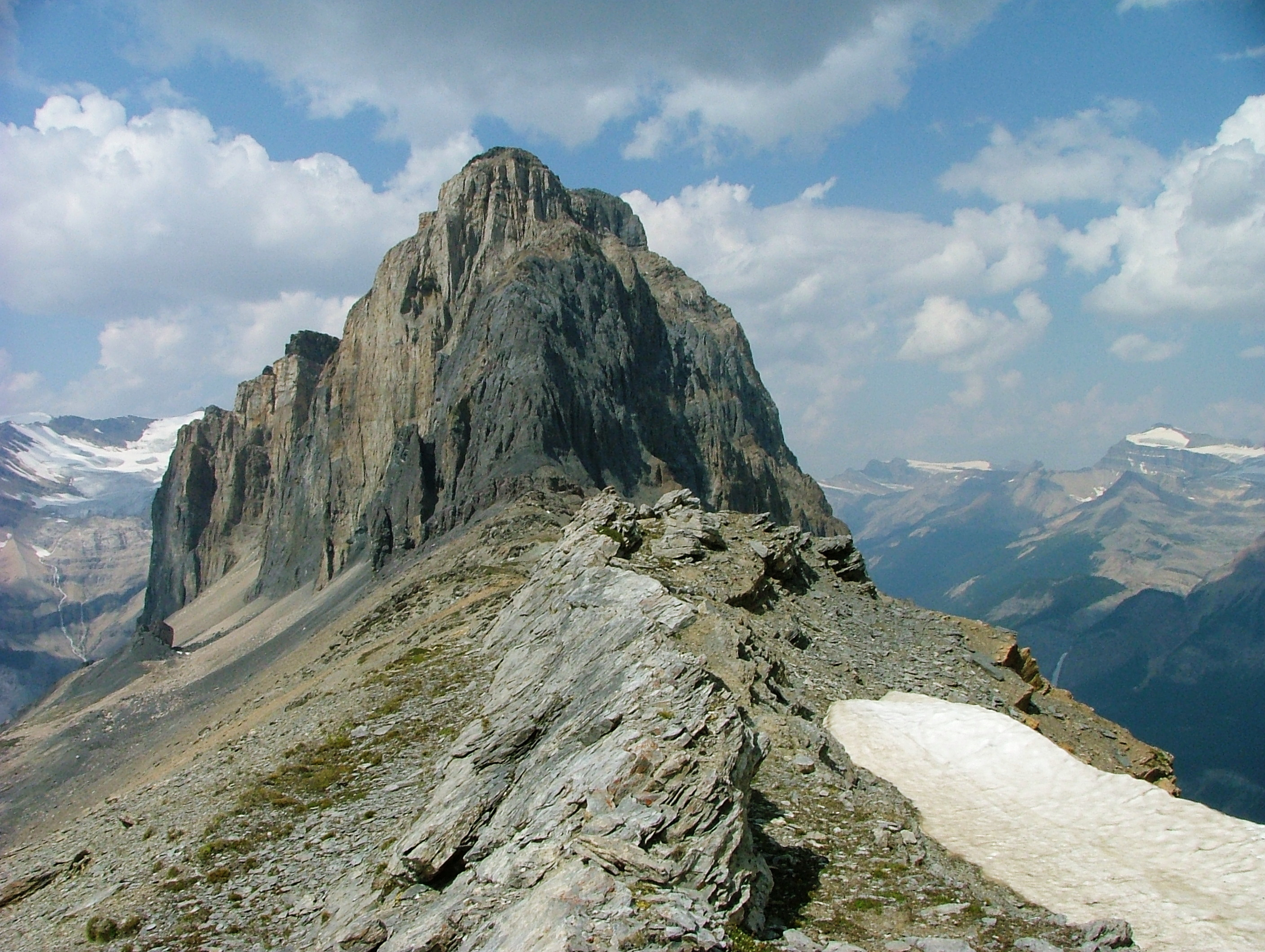
Fossil Ridge forms the spectacular backdrop to the Phyllopod bed.

The phyllopod bed is a 2.31 m thick layer of the 7 m thick Greater Phyllopod Bed, found in the Walcott Quarry on Fossil Ridge, between Wapta Mountain and Mount Field, at an elevation of around 2,300 metres (7,500 ft), around 5 kilometres (3.1 mi) north of the railway town of Field, British Columbia, in the Canadian Rocky Mountains. It is adjacent to Mount Burgess, where Walcott first discovered the Burgess Shale formation.

Walcott divided the bed into twelve units based on the rock type and fossil content. Certain fossil beds provide reference levels and can be recognized by the superabundance of a particular type of fossil: for instance, the Great Marrella layer and Great Eldonia layer.

== History ==
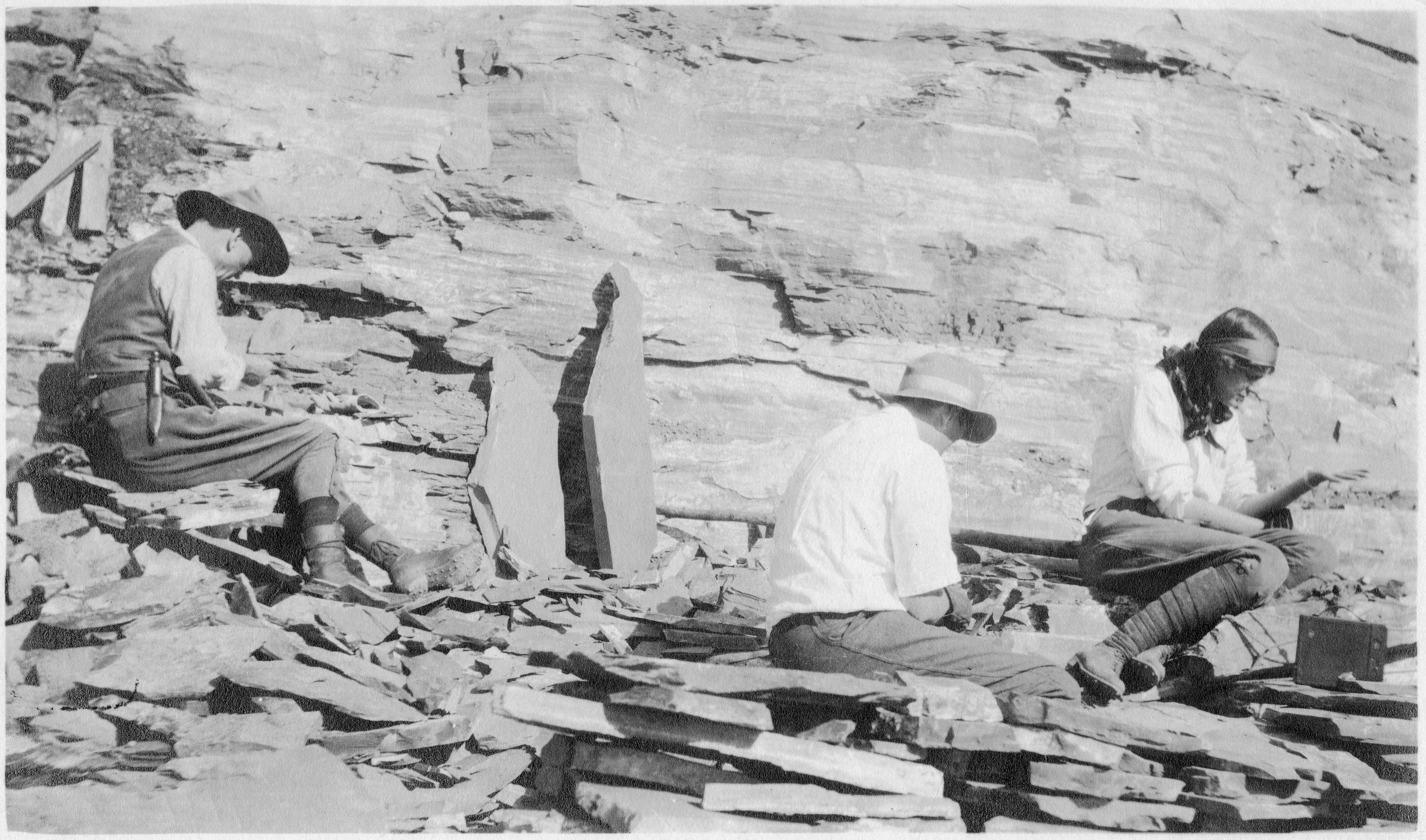
Walcott and his team collecting from the Phyllopod bed, c. 1913

After locating soft-bodied fossils in loose fragments of rock in 1907, the Phyllopod bed was located in a source for the fragments' origins by the Walcotts in 1910. Extensive quarrying was performed in field seasons until 1913, and Walcott considered the ton of shale he collected in his next visit, in 1917, to have practically exhausted the productive potential of the bed.

== Taphonomy ==
Most of the organisms within the Phyllopod bed had been transported minimal distances before they were buried, and decayed in place until they were buried (at which time decay and disarticulation was halted). Mineralization of tissues occurred shortly afterwards. The community of organisms preserved is a good representation of the (preservable) community; the biasing effects of time-averaging and preferential decay seem to be minimal. A great deal of compaction occurred after the deposition of the fossils.

== Sedimentation ==
The unit consists of mudstones that intergrade into coarser shelly sandstones that sometimes form small nodules. There are (very rare) turbidite layers, but on the whole the unit was deposited in large events that dumped tens of centimetres of sediment at a time as a slurry of mud was washed over the site by a density current, sweeping up and entombing any organisms in its path.

== Preservation ==
The preservation of the fossils – and their pre-burial livelihoods – was likely facilitated by mats of the cyanobacterium Morania, which served to bind the sediment and allow anoxic conditions to quickly form.

== Community structure ==
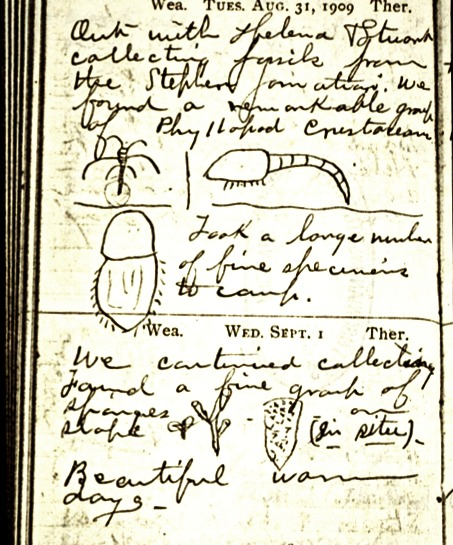
A page of Walcott's field notebook, depicting some familiar fossils from the Phyllopod bed

The phyllopod bed preserves a range of organisms from both a rich benthic community (organisms living on and in the sediment) and representatives of the nekton. Many feeding modes are present and a complex food web can be inferred. Whilst some shelly fossils are present (and seem to be typical of any Cambrian shelly fossil assemblage), the majority of fossils – probably 98% of what was alive at the time of burial – do not derive from biomineralized components.

=== Ichnofauna ===
Whilst trace fossils or ichnofauna are locally abundant in other areas of the Burgess Shale, they are almost completely absent in the Phyllopod bed, perhaps as a result of the presence of Morania.
