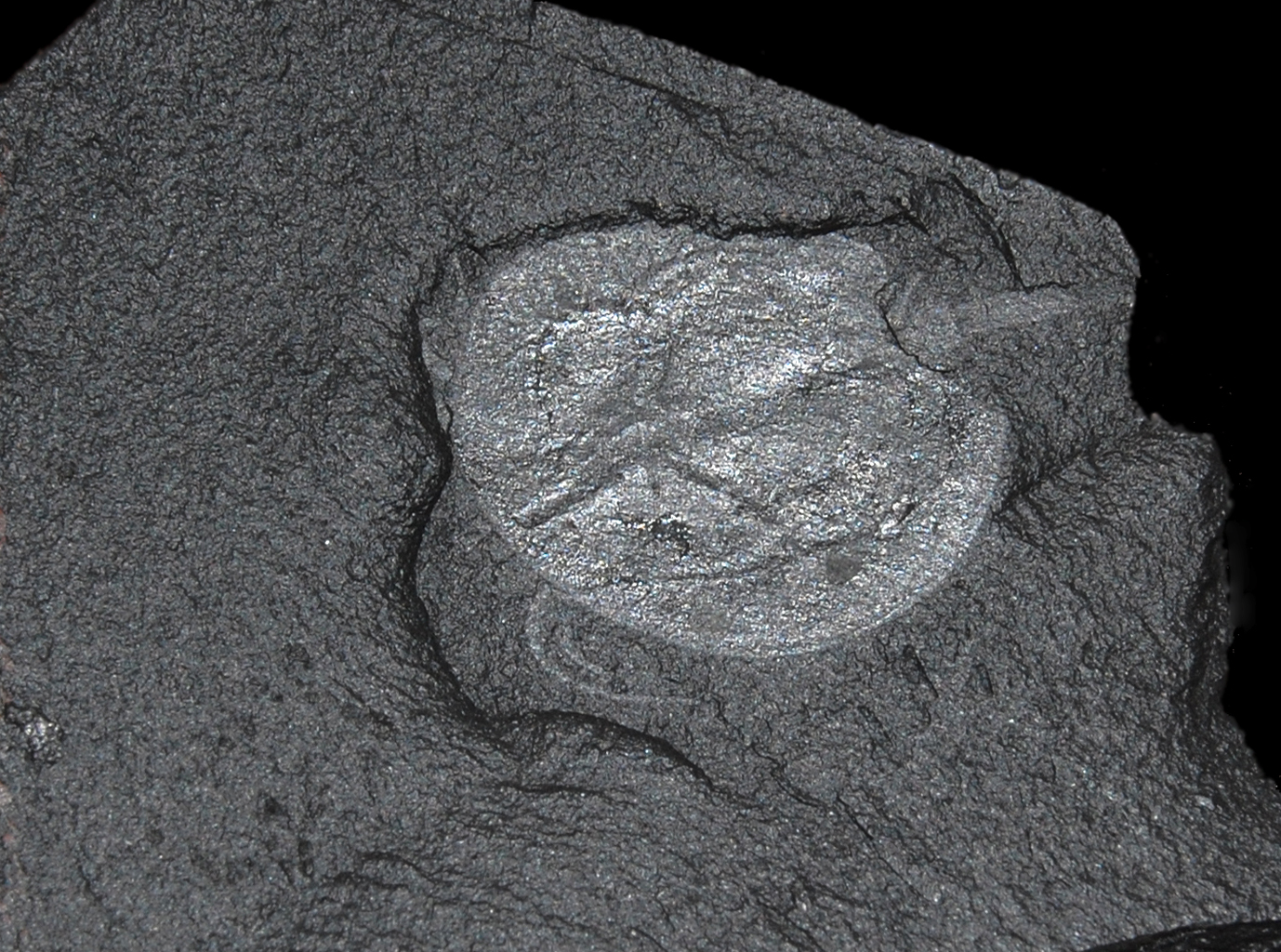
- Burgessia bella
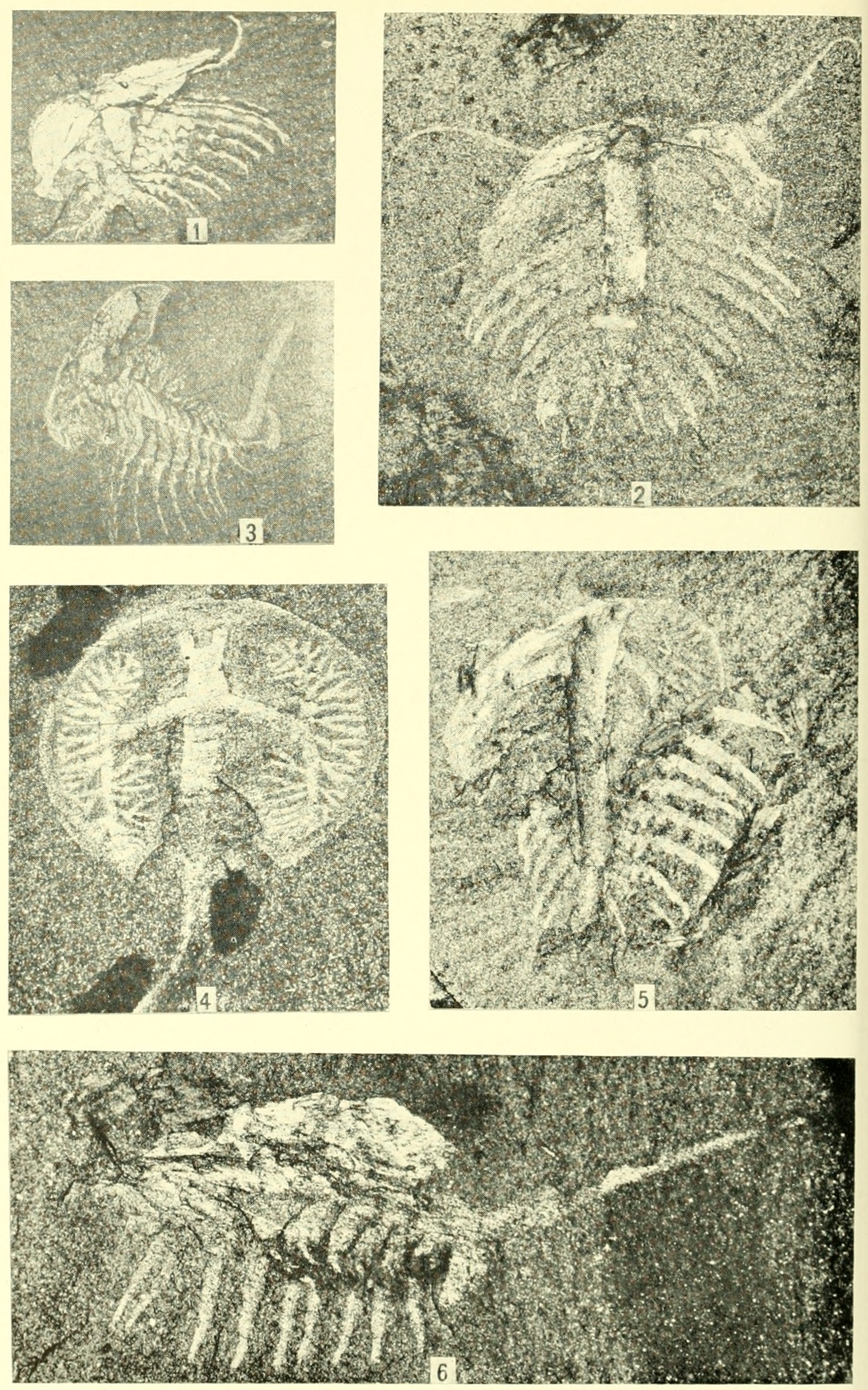
- Various specimens

Scientific classification
- Kingdom: Animalia
- Phylum: Arthropoda
- Class: incertae sedis
- Genus: †Burgessia; Walcott, 1912
- Species: †B. bella

Binomial name
- †Burgessia bella Walcott, 1912

= Burgessia =

Burgessia Temporal range: Mid-Cambrian 508 Ma

Extinct genus of arthropods

Burgessia is a genus of arthropod known from the mid-Cambrian aged Burgess Shale of British Columbia, Canada. It is relatively abundant, with over 1,700 specimens having been collected.

== Description ==
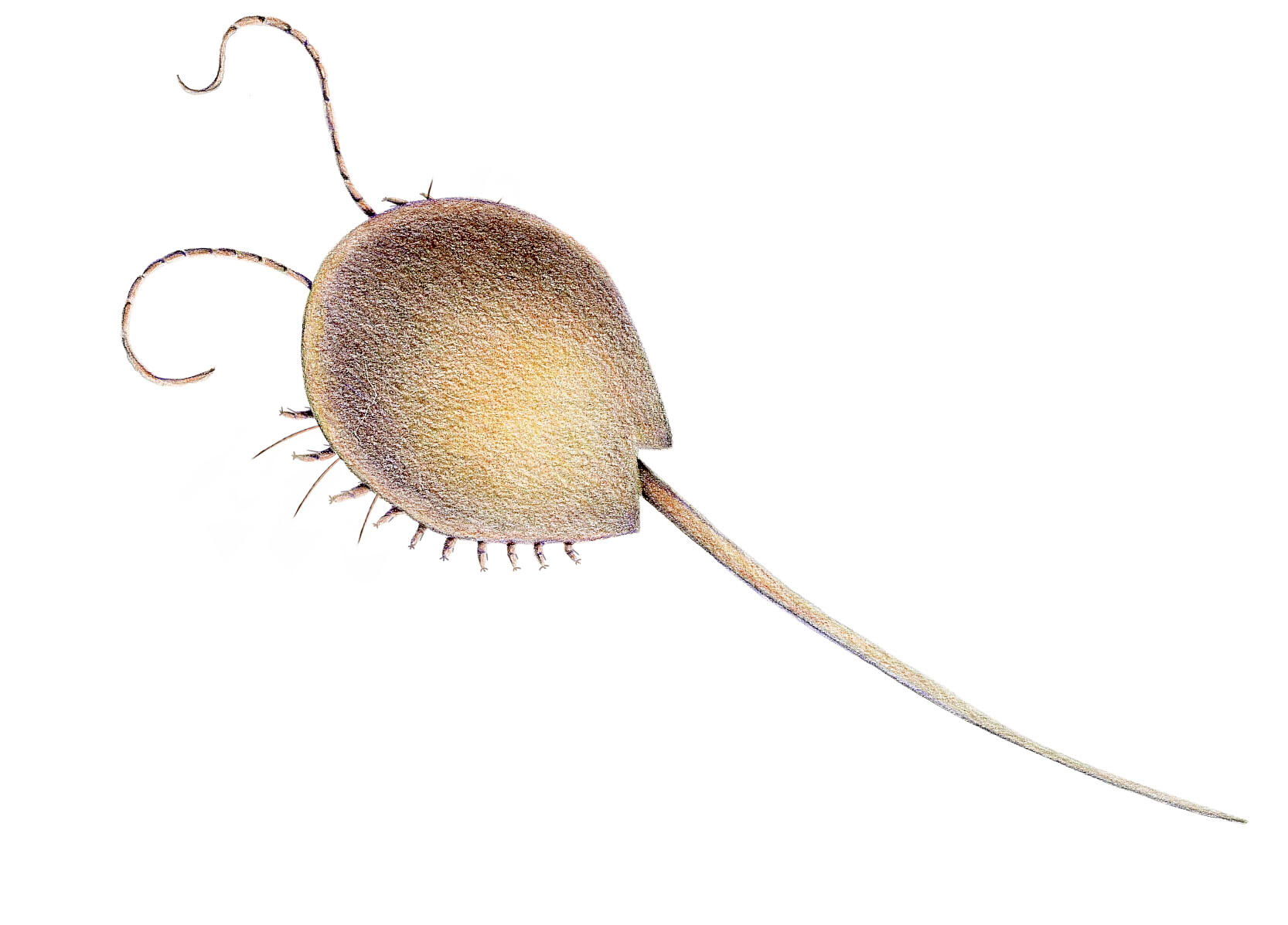
Restoration

The body had an unsegmented approximately circular carapace that was somewhat convex. It was likely thin and had only weak sclerotization. A pair of tapering flexible segmented antennae projected forwards from the head, which were about equal in length to the carapace, these were likely tactile in function. There are three pairs of appendages attached to the cephalon (head region) excluding the antennae that functioned as walking limbs, as well as seven pairs of biramous (two-branched) walking limbs with gills, otherwise similar to the cephalic limbs running along the trunk, which decreased in size posteriorly. Although not visible on any specimens, the mouth was almost certainly located on the underside of the body. The circular carapace was largely occupied by the guts, which were divided into two sections on either side of the carapace. The body ended with a long telson, which was moveable and could either be rigid or flexible, which was likely controlled by the injection/withdrawal of fluid from a cavity within the telson and the corresponding increase/decrease of hydrostatic pressure. It was probably used to turn the animal upright if it became overturned.

== Ecology ==
It was likely a benthic sea floor dweller that probably could not swim. It has been suggested to have been a deposit feeder. The first segments and the coxae of the legs had inward, downward facing projections, which in combination with the projections on the opposite pair of legs was likely used to grip food and in combination with other legs bring it forward towards the mouth.

== Taxonomy ==
Burgessia is not placed as part of any major arthropod group, and its relationships to other arthropods are uncertain. Some authors have suggested a close relationship with marrellomorphs, mandibulates such as crustaceans, and Artiopoda (the group containing trilobites and their close relatives), based on the morphology of the antennae.

== Sources ==
- The Crucible of Creation: The Burgess Shale and the Rise of Animals by Simon Conway-Morris
- Wonderful Life: The Burgess Shale and the Nature of History by Stephen Jay Gould

== See also ==
- Paleobiota of the Burgess Shale
