= Charles Doolittle Walcott =

American paleontologist (1850–1927)

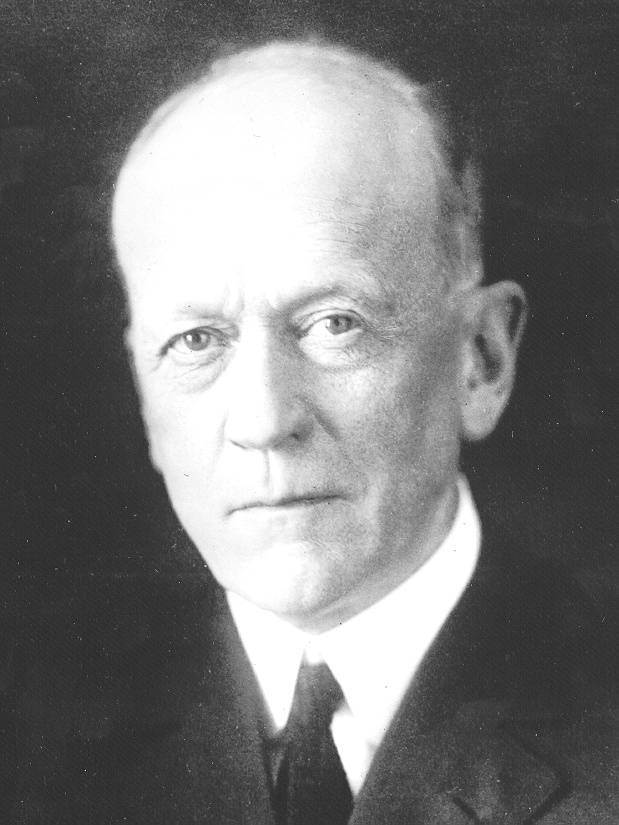

4th Secretary of the Smithsonian Institution
- In office 1907–1927
- Preceded by: Samuel Pierpont Langley
- Succeeded by: Charles Greeley Abbot

3rd Director of the United States Geological Survey
- In office 1894 – 1907
- Preceded by: John Wesley Powell
- Succeeded by: George Otis Smith

4th Director of the National Advisory Committee for Aeronautics
- In office 1920–1927
- President: Calvin Coolidge
- Preceded by: John R. Freeman
- Succeeded by: Joseph Sweetman Ames

Personal details
- Born: March 31, 1850 New York Mills, New York, U.S.
- Died: February 9, 1927 (aged 76) Washington, D.C., U.S.
- Resting place: Rock Creek Cemetery; Washington, D.C.
- Spouses: Lura Ann Rust (m. 1872; died 1876) Helena Breese Stevens (m. 1888; died 1911) Mary Morris Vaux (m. 1914)
- Children: 4
- Scientific career
- Awards: Bigsby Medal (1895); Wollaston Medal (1918); Mary Clark Thompson Medal (1921)
- Fields: Paleontology
- Workplaces: Smithsonian Institution; US Geological Survey
- Author abbrev. (zoology): Walcott

Charles Doolittle Walcott (March 31, 1850 – February 9, 1927) was an American paleontologist, administrator of the Smithsonian Institution from 1907 to 1927, and the third director of the United States Geological Survey. He is famous for his discovery in 1909 of well-preserved fossils, including some of the oldest soft-part imprints, in the Burgess Shale of British Columbia, Canada.

== Early life ==
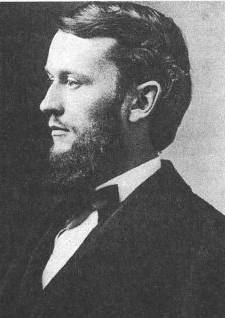
Charles Doolittle Wallcott in 1873

Charles Doolittle Walcott was born on March 31, 1850, in New York Mills, New York. His grandfather, Benjamin S. Walcott, moved from Rhode Island in 1822. His father, also Charles Doolittle Walcott, died when Charles Jr. was only two. Walcott was the youngest of four children. He was interested in nature from an early age, collecting minerals and bird eggs and, eventually, fossils. He attended various schools in the Utica area but left at the age of eighteen without completing high school, the end of his formal education. His interest in fossils solidified as he became a commercial fossil collector.

On January 9, 1872, Walcott married Lura Ann Rust, daughter of the owner of a farm in New York where Walcott made one of his most important trilobite discoveries (Walcott-Rust quarry). She died on January 23, 1876. Walcott's interest in fossils led to his acquaintance with Louis Agassiz of Harvard University, who encouraged him to work in the field of paleontology; later that year, he began work as the assistant to the state paleontologist, James Hall. He lost this job after two years but was soon recruited to the newly formed US Geological Survey as a geological assistant.

== Career ==
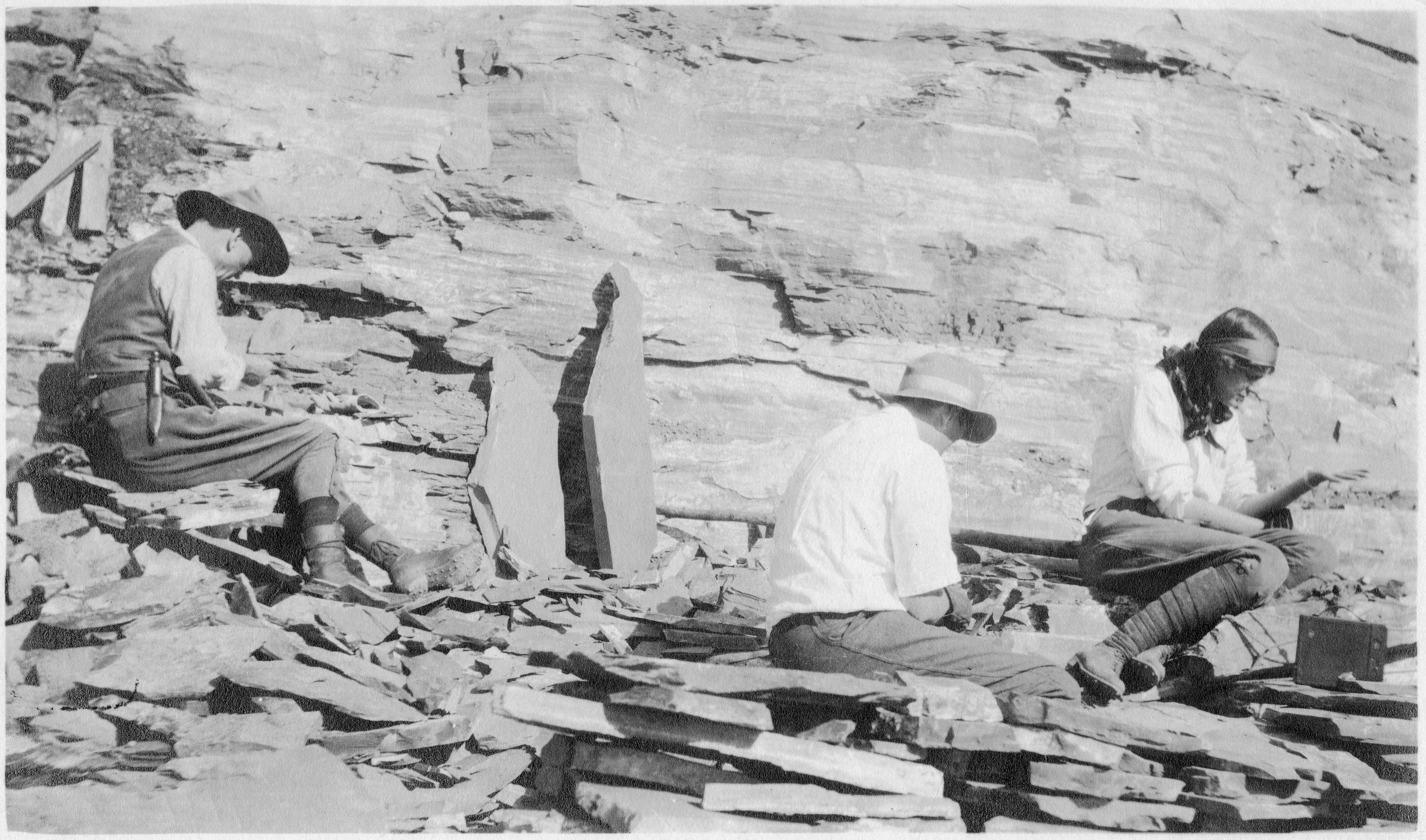
Charles excavating the Burgess Shale (near Field, British Columbia) with his daughter and son, in the quarry which now bears his name

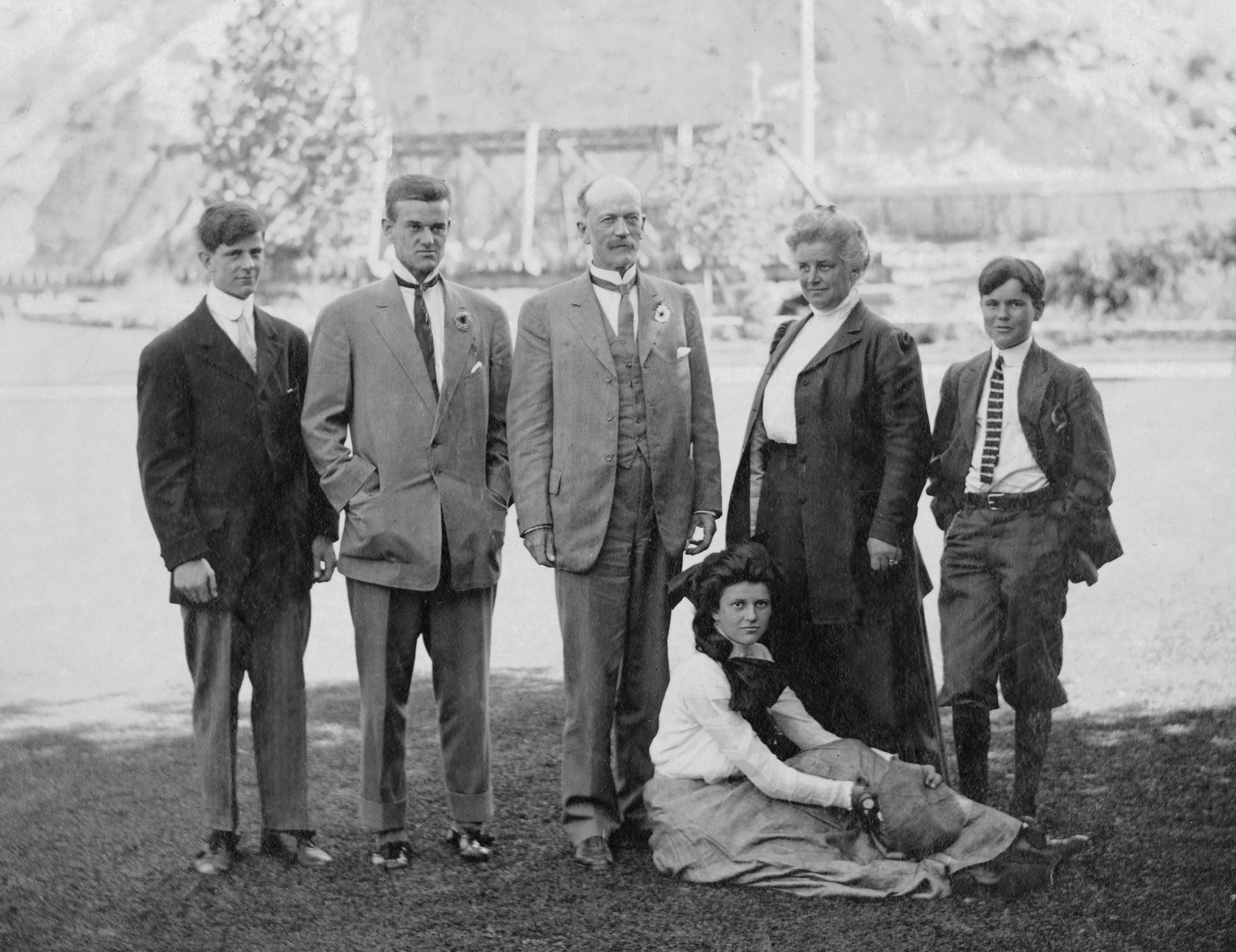
Charles Doolittle Walcott and his family in Provo, Utah, around 1907. Walcott often took his family along on collecting trips. Click on the photo for more information about the Walcotts.

Walcott began his professional paleontology career by discovering new localities, such as the Walcott-Rust quarry in upstate New York and the Georgia Plane trilobite beds in Vermont, and by selling specimens to Yale University. In 1876, he became the assistant to James Hall, State Geologist of New York. Walcott also became a member of the American Association for the Advancement of Science.

In 1879, Walcott joined the US Geological Survey and rose to become chief paleologist in 1893 and then director in 1894. His work focused on Cambrian strata in locations throughout the United States and Canada; his numerous field trips and fossil discoveries made important contributions to stratigraphy.

He married Helena Breese Stevens in 1888. They had four children between 1889 and 1896: Charles Doolittle Walcott, Sydney Stevens Walcott, Helena Breese Walcott, and Benjamin Stuart Walcott.

Walcott was elected to the National Academy of Sciences in 1896, the American Philosophical Society in 1897, and the American Academy of Art and Sciences in 1899. In 1901, he served both as president of the Geological Society of America and the Philosophical Society of Washington. In 1902, he met with Andrew Carnegie and became one of the founders and incorporators of the Carnegie Institution of Washington. He served in various administrative and research positions in that organization. In 1921 Walcott was awarded the inaugural Mary Clark Thompson Medal from the National Academy of Sciences.

He served as president of the American Association for the Advancement of Science in 1923. He previously spearheaded the U.S. Geological Survey under President Theodore Roosevelt.

Walcott had an interest in the conservation movement and assisted its efforts.

== Smithsonian ==
Walcott became Secretary of the Smithsonian Institution in 1907 after the death of Samuel Pierpont Langley, holding the post until his own death. He was succeeded by Charles Greeley Abbot. Because of Walcott's responsibilities at the Smithsonian, he resigned as director of the United States Geological Survey. As part of the centennial celebration of Darwin's birth, Walcott was awarded an honorary doctorate by the University of Cambridge in 1909.

== Burgess shale ==
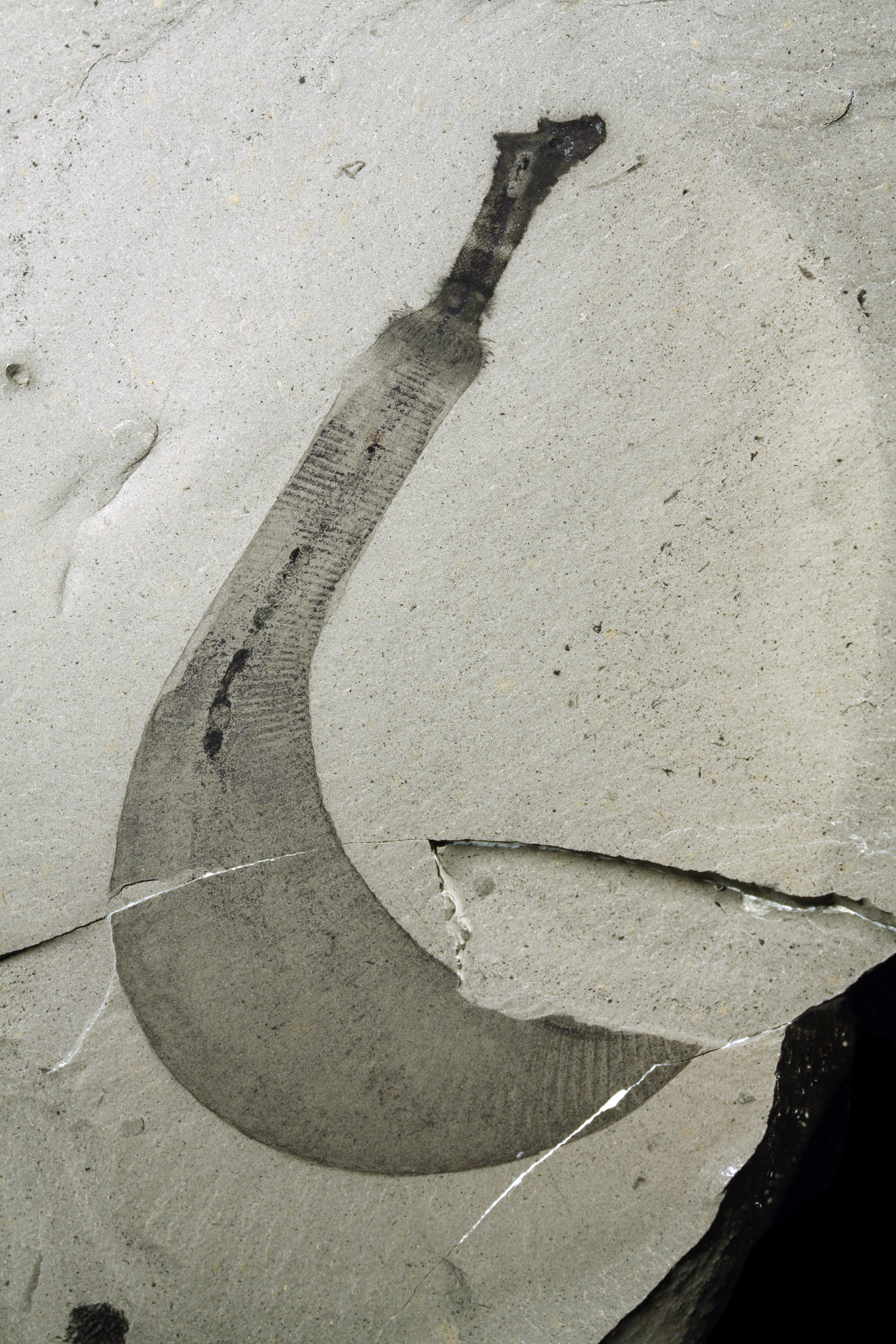
Ottoia, a soft-bodied worm, abundant in the Burgess Shale

In 1910, the year after his discovery of 505 million year old (middle Cambrian) fossils in the Burgess shale, Walcott returned to the area accompanied by his sons Stuart and Sidney. Together they examined all the layers on the ridge above the point where the fossil-laden rock had been found, eventually finding the fossiliferous band. Between 1910 and 1924, Walcott returned repeatedly to collect more than 65,000 specimens from what is now known as the Walcott Quarry, named after him. The find includes exceptional preservation of the soft parts of its fossils, one of the oldest fossil beds containing soft-part imprints.

Walcott's wife Helena died in a train crash in Connecticut in 1911. In 1914, Walcott married his third wife, Mary Morris Vaux, an amateur artist and avid naturalist. She accompanied him on his expeditions, enjoying the study of nature. She made watercolor illustrations of wildflowers as she traveled with him in Canada.

Although Walcott spent a considerable amount of time at the Burgess Shale quarry on what became known as Fossil Ridge, he also traveled widely in other areas of the Canadian Rockies. Some of his numerous scientific publications feature spectacular panoramic photographs of the mountains taken from high passes or high on mountain slopes.

== The NACA ==
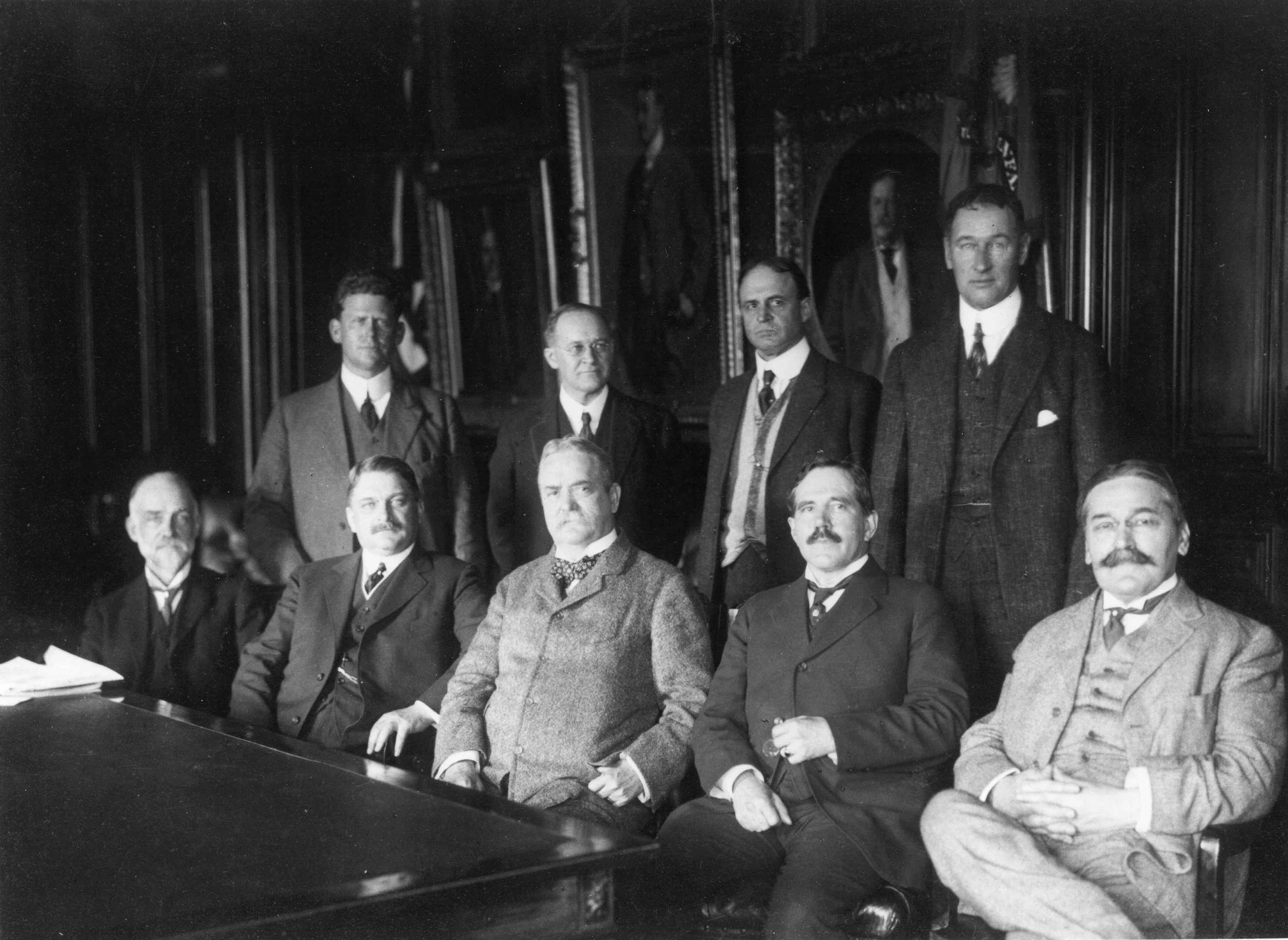
The first meeting of the NACA in 1915

In 1914 Walcott convened a conference in Washington, D.C. for the purpose of stimulating interest in aeronautic science, and its relation to the U.S. government. The conference led to an act of congress organizing an Advisory Committee for Aeronautics (later named the National Advisory Committee for Aeronautics) "to supervise and direct the scientific study of the problems of flight with a view to their practical solution." This committee was composed of twelve members, two each from the Army and Navy, one each representing the Smithsonian Institution, the Weather Bureau, and the National Bureau of Standards. Five additional members were chosen "who shall be acquainted with the needs of aeronautical science, either civil or military, or skilled in aeronautical engineering or its allied sciences". Brigadier General George P. Scriven, Chief Signal Officer of the Army, was chairman of the committee; Walcott was elected chairman of the Executive Committee. William F. Durand was one of the civilian members of the Committee.

== Wright Brothers Controversy ==
In light of the Wright brothers patent war and to discredit the Wright brothers, Glenn Curtiss in 1914 helped Walcott secretly make major modifications to a failed aerodrome built in 1903 by Professor Samuel Langley to make it appear able to fly. After the flight demonstrations, Walcott ordered the Langley machine be restored to its 1903 condition to cover up the deception before it was put on display. It took until 1928 for the Smithsonian Board of Regents to pass a resolution acknowledging that the Wright brothers deserved the credit for "the first successful flight with a power-propelled heavier-than-air machine carrying a man."

== Death and legacy ==
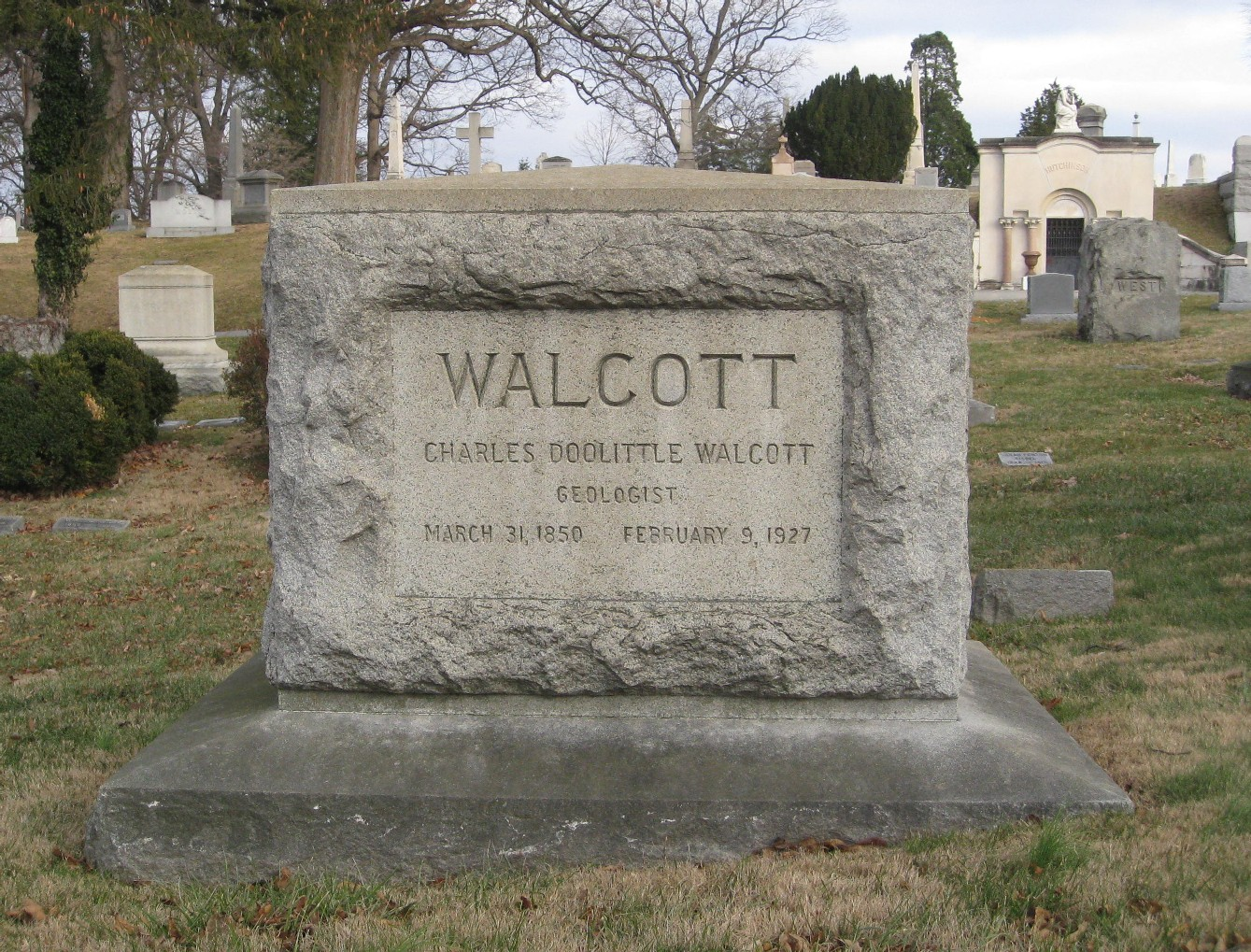
Gravesite of Walcott in Rock Creek Cemetery in Washington, D.C.

After Walcott's death in Washington, D.C., his samples, photographs, and notes remained in storage until their rediscovery by a new generation of paleontologists in the late 1960s. Since then, many of his interpretations have been revised.

Walcott would be little known today if he had not been brought to attention by Stephen Jay Gould's book Wonderful Life (1989). In this book, Gould put forth his opinion that Walcott failed to see the differences among the Burgess Shale species and "shoehorned" most of these fossils into existing phyla. Many paleontologists would now take a much less negative view of Walcott's descriptions and of the theoretical perspective that shaped them.

Walcott's work on Ordovician trilobites of New York also tended to be overlooked until, in the early 1990s, Rochester-based amateur paleontologist Thomas Whiteley revived Walcott's research and re-opened the Walcott–Rust quarry near Russia, New York. This localized stratum has some of the best preserved Laurentian trilobites ever found, including enrolled specimens with soft body parts.

The Walcott Peak, near where he first discovered the Burgess Shale on Mount Burgess in Canada, was named after him. The nearby Walcott Quarry, with the Phyllopod bed of Burgess Shale fossils between Wapta Mountain and Mount Field, is also named for him. The Charles Doolittle Walcott Medal is awarded by the National Academy of Sciences every five years for outstanding work in the field of Precambrian and Cambrian life and history.

The World War II Liberty Ship SS Charles D. Walcott was named in his honor.

== Publications ==
- Walcott, Charles Doolittle (1924). Cambrian Geology and Paleontology. Smithsonian Miscellaneous Collection. Vol. 67. Frances Wieser (illustrations). Washington, D.C. and Baltimore, MD: Smithsonian Institution and The Lord Baltimore Press.
- Walcott, Charles Doolittle (1924). Nomenclature of Some Post Cambrian and Cambrian Cordilleran Formations. Smithsonian Miscellaneous Collection. Vol. 67. Frances Wieser (illustrations). Washington, D.C. and Baltimore, MD: Smithsonian Institution and The Lord Baltimore Press.
- Cambrian Brachiopoda with descriptions of new genera and species, (1905) Proceedings of the United States National Museum; v. 28.
- Cambrian faunas of China, (1905) From the Proceedings of the United States national museum, vol.xxx. 106 p.
- Cambrian Geology and Paleontology, (1910) at Internet Archive
- Correlation Papers on the Cambrian, (1890) Bulletin of the United States Geological Survey; no.81. 447 p.
- The fauna of the Lower Cambrian or Olenellus zone, (1890) Extract from the 10th annual report of the director of the U. S. Geological Survey, 1888–89, pt. I. p. 516–524.
- Fossil Medusa, (1898) Monographs of the United States Geological Survey; no.30, 201 p.
- Geology of the Eureka district, Nevada, with an atlas, (1892) Monographs of the United States Geological Survey; no.20, 419 p.
- The North American continent during Cambrian time, (1892) Extract from the 12th annual report of the director of the U.S. Geological survey, 1890–91, pt. I. pp:523–568
- Cambrian faunas of North America, (1884) from Bulletin of the U. S. Geological Survey
- The Paleontology of the Eureka District, (1884) Monographs of the United States Geological Survey; no.8, 298 p.

== See also ==
- Science and technology in Canada
- Walcott-Rust quarry

Government offices
Preceded by John Wesley Powell	Director of the United States Geological Survey; 1894–1907	Succeeded by George Otis Smith
Preceded by Samuel Pierpont Langley	Secretary of the Smithsonian Institution; 1907–1927	Succeeded by Charles Greeley Abbot
