= Mount Field (British Columbia) =

Mountain in British Columbia, Canada

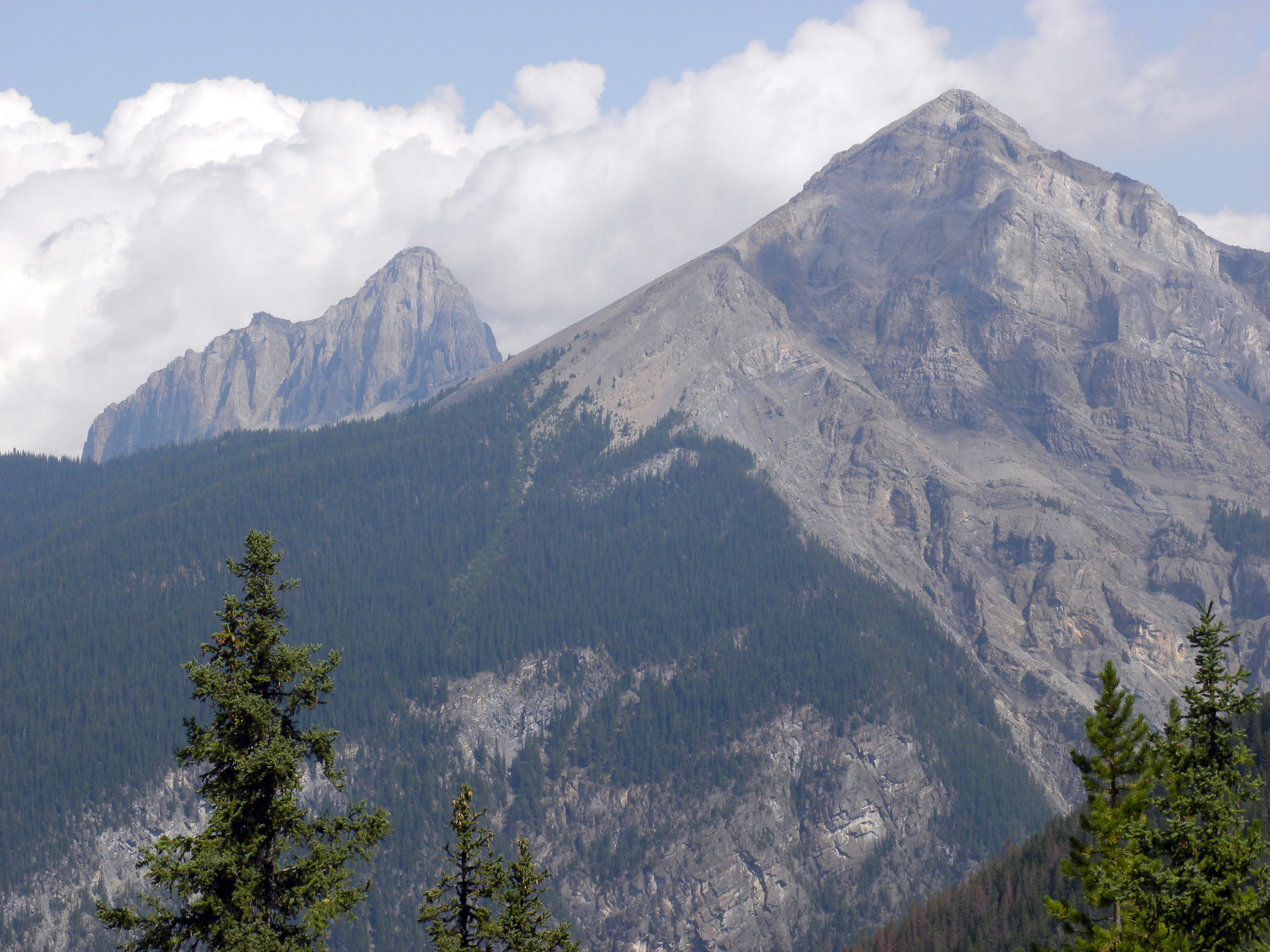
- Mount Field with Mount Wapta in the background; near Field, British Columbia, Canada.

Highest point
- Elevation: 2,643 m (8,671 ft)
- Prominence: 182 m (597 ft)
- Listing: Mountains of British Columbia
- Coordinates: 51°25′51″N 116°27′46″W

Geography
- Location within British Columbia Location within Canada
- Interactive map of Mount Field
- Location: Yoho National Park; British Columbia, Canada
- District: Kootenay Land District
- Parent range: President Range
- Topo map: NTS 82N8 Lake Louise

Climbing
- Easiest route: Scramble

Mount Field is a mountain located about 4 km (2 mi) northeast of the town of Field in Yoho National Park, Canada. The mountain was named in 1884 after Cyrus West Field, an American merchant who had laid the first Atlantic cable. Field was visiting the Canadian Rockies as a guest of the CPR at the time the mountain was named. Precipitation runoff from Mount Field drains into the Kicking Horse River. Topographic relief is significant as the summit rises 1,360 meters (4,462 feet) above the river in two kilometers (1.2 mile). The Trans-Canada Highway (Highway 1) traverses the southern foot of the mountain.

== Geology ==
Mount Field is composed of sedimentary rock laid down during the Precambrian to Jurassic periods. Formed in shallow seas, this sedimentary rock was pushed east and over the top of younger rock during the Laramide orogeny. The Burgess Shale is located below the ridge connecting Mt. Field to Wapta Mountain.

== Climate ==
Based on the Köppen climate classification, Mount Field is located in a subarctic climate zone with cold, snowy winters, and mild summers. Winter temperatures can drop below −20 °C with wind chill factors below −30 °C.

== Gallery ==
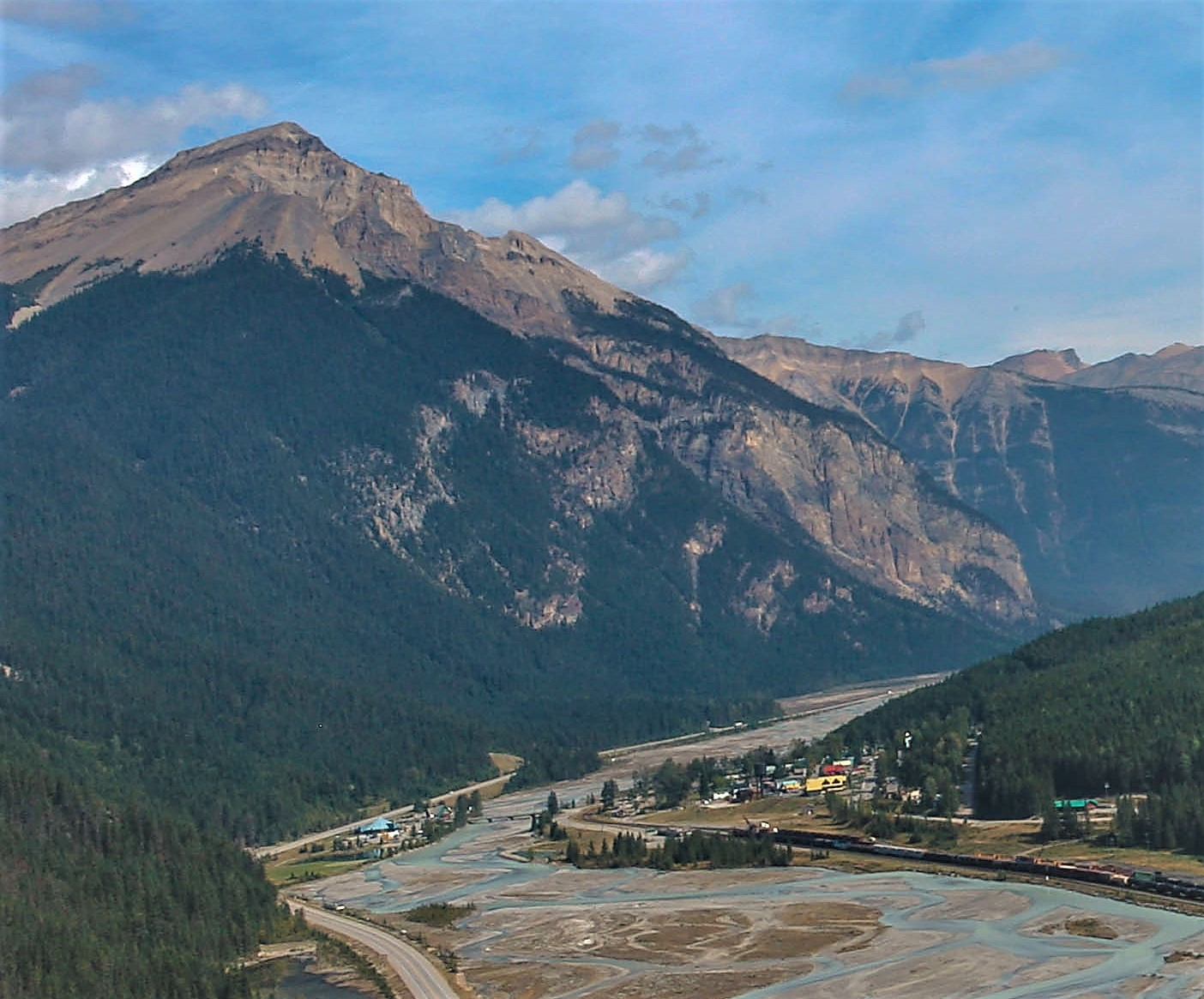
Mount Field rising above Field, British Columbia

== See also ==
- Geography of British Columbia
