= Wapta Mountain =

Mountain in Yoho National Park, British Columbia, Canada

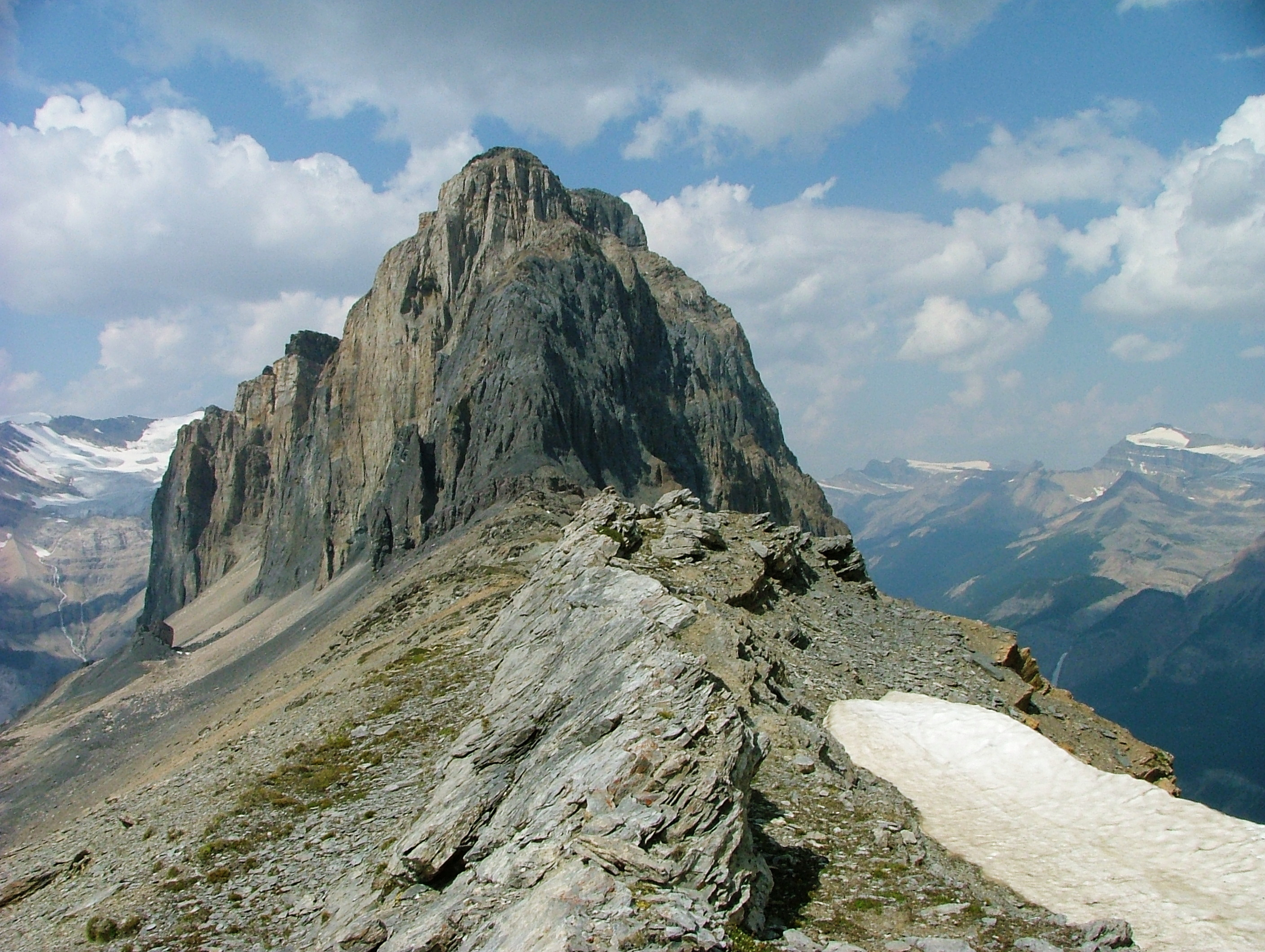
- Wapta Mountain marks the end of Fossil Ridge

Highest point
- Elevation: 2,778 m (9,114 ft) (Note: Other sources give 2782 m.)
- Prominence: 952 m (3,123 ft)
- Listing: Mountains of British Columbia
- Coordinates: 51°27′05″N 116°28′39″W

Geography
- Location within British Columbia
- Country: Canada
- Province: British Columbia
- District: Kootenay Land District
- Protected area: Yoho National Park
- Parent range: Waputik Mountains (Note: Peakbagger states Wapta Mountain is in the President Range but the CGNDB map clearly shows the mountain outside the range boundary.)
- Topo map: NTS 82N8 Lake Louise

Climbing
- First ascent: 1901

Wapta Mountain is a mountain located in the Canadian Rockies between Emerald Lake and Yoho Valley in Yoho National Park, British Columbia, Canada. It stands just north of the ridge containing the Burgess Shale fossil beds. Along with The Vice President and Mount Burgess, Wapta Mountain forms the backdrop to Emerald Lake.

In 1901, James Outram, J. H. Scattergood, and their guide C. Bohren, became the first people to ascend Wapta Mountain. Wapta Mountain overlooks Takakkaw Falls (1,247 feet), the second tallest waterfall in western Canada. The word "Wapta" means "river" in the Stoney language.

== Gallery ==
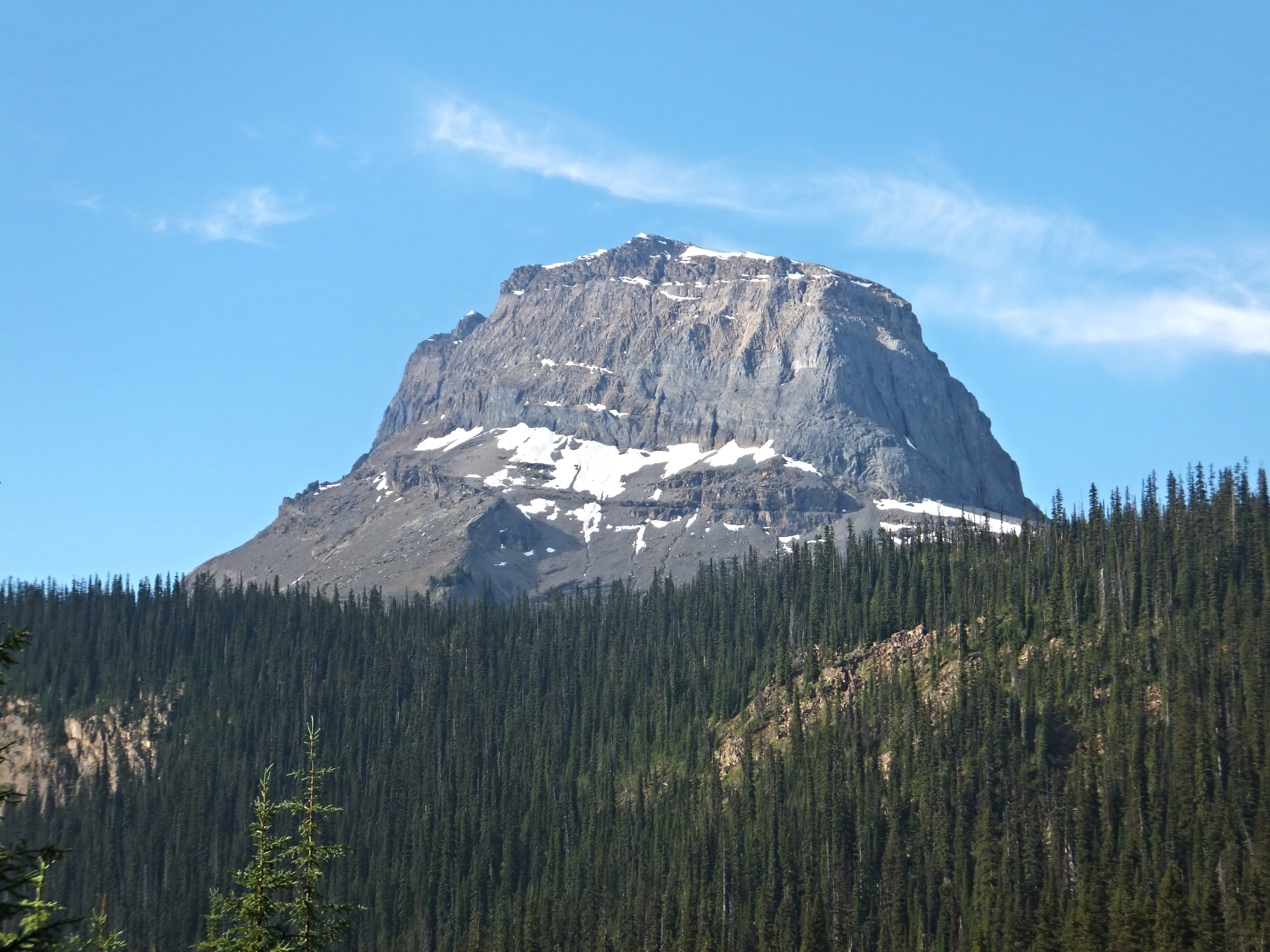
Wapta Mountain
