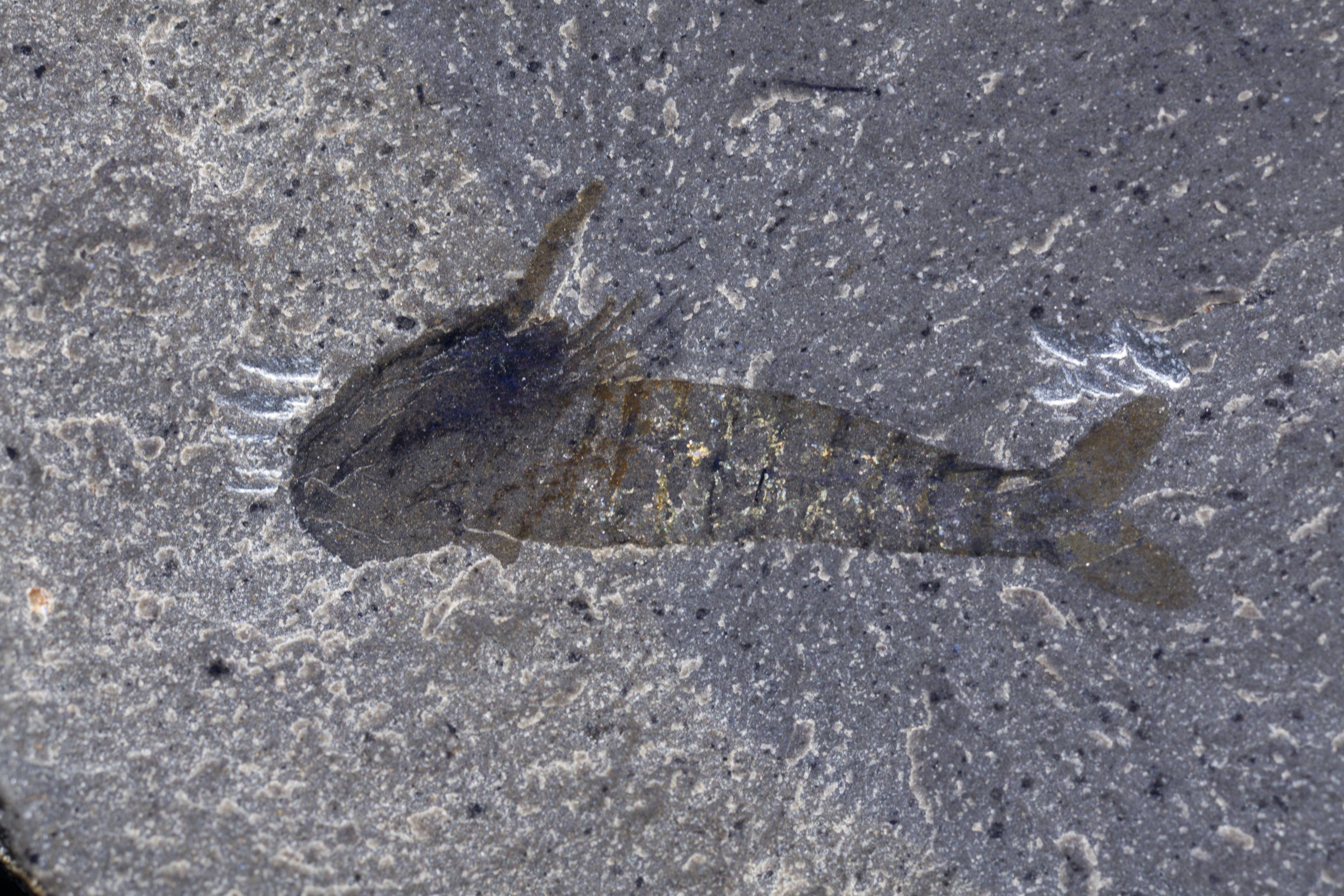
- Fossil of Plenocaris plena from the Burgess shale
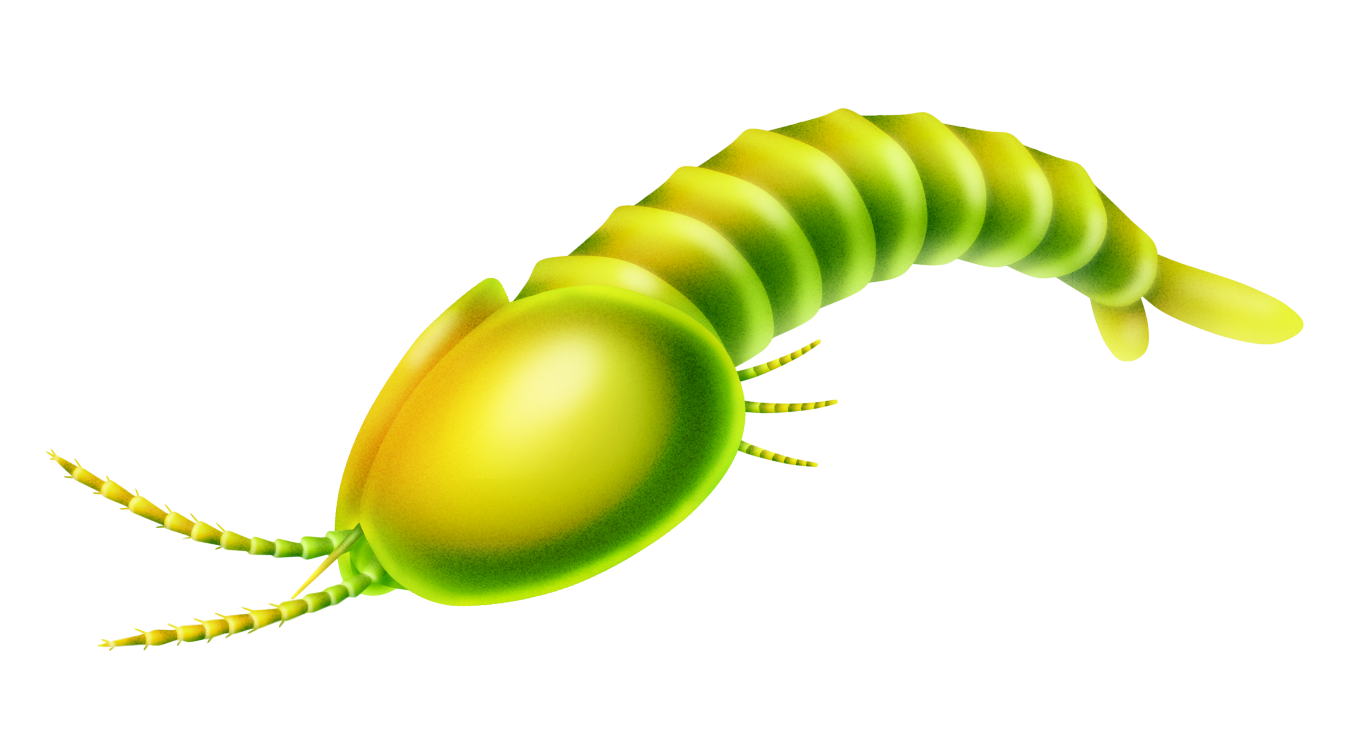
- Life restoration

Scientific classification
- Kingdom: Animalia
- Phylum: Arthropoda
- Clade: Mandibulata
- Order: †Hymenocarina
- Family: †Waptiidae
- Genus: †Plenocaris; Whittington, 1974
- Species: †P. plena

Binomial name
- †Plenocaris plena (Walcott, 1912)

Synonyms
- Yohoia plena Walcott, 1912

= Plenocaris =

Plenocaris Temporal range: Chengjiang–Burgess shale

Extinct genus of arthropods

Plenocaris plena is a genus of extinct bivalved hymenocarine arthropod that lived in the Cambrian aged Burgess Shale and Chengjiang. Originally described as a species of Yohoia by Walcott in 1912, it was placed into its own genus in 1974.

The head has a pair of simple antennae. The body has 13 tergites, with trunk tergites 2 to 4 having pairs of elongate and uniramous appendages, with appendages absent from the other body segments. The body terminates with paired tail flukes. Unlike waptiids, but similar to Synophalos, the tail flukes lack segmentation. 106 specimens of Plenocaris are known from the Greater Phyllopod bed, where they comprise 0.20% of the community. It has been suggested to be a member of Hymenocarina, which contains numerous other Cambrian bivalved arthropods. Its ecology is unclear. Some specimens have been found with sediment within the gut tract, possibly suggesting it was a deposit feeder, though this is not definitive and it could also have had a predatory of suspension feeding lifestyle. The lack of swimming appendages means that swimming was likely primarily accomplished with movement of the trunk and tail fan.
