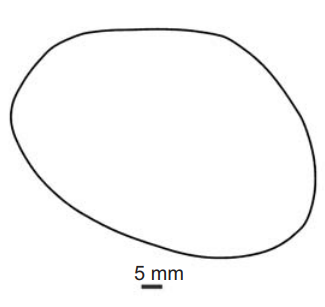
- Drawing of a fossil of Yunnanocaris

Scientific classification
- Kingdom: Animalia
- Phylum: Arthropoda
- Order: †Hymenocarina
- Genus: †Yunnanocaris; Hou, 1999
- Species: †Y. megista

Binomial name
- †Yunnanocaris megista Hou, 1999

= Yunnanocaris =

Yunnanocaris Temporal range: Cambrian Stage 3

Extinct genus of arthropods

Yunnanocaris megista is a species of Cambrian bivalved arthropod known from the Chengjiang biota and described by Hou Xianguang in 1999. It is known only from isolated carapaces and its soft anatomy remains unknown. The classification of Yunnanocaris is uncertain, although its carapace has been noted to be similar to that of other Cambrian bivalved arthropods such as Chuandianella. In a 2018 redescription of Waptia, Yunnanocaris was proposed to be a member of Hymenocarina, a group of mandibulate bivalved arthropods.

== See also ==
- Paleobiota of the Maotianshan Shales
