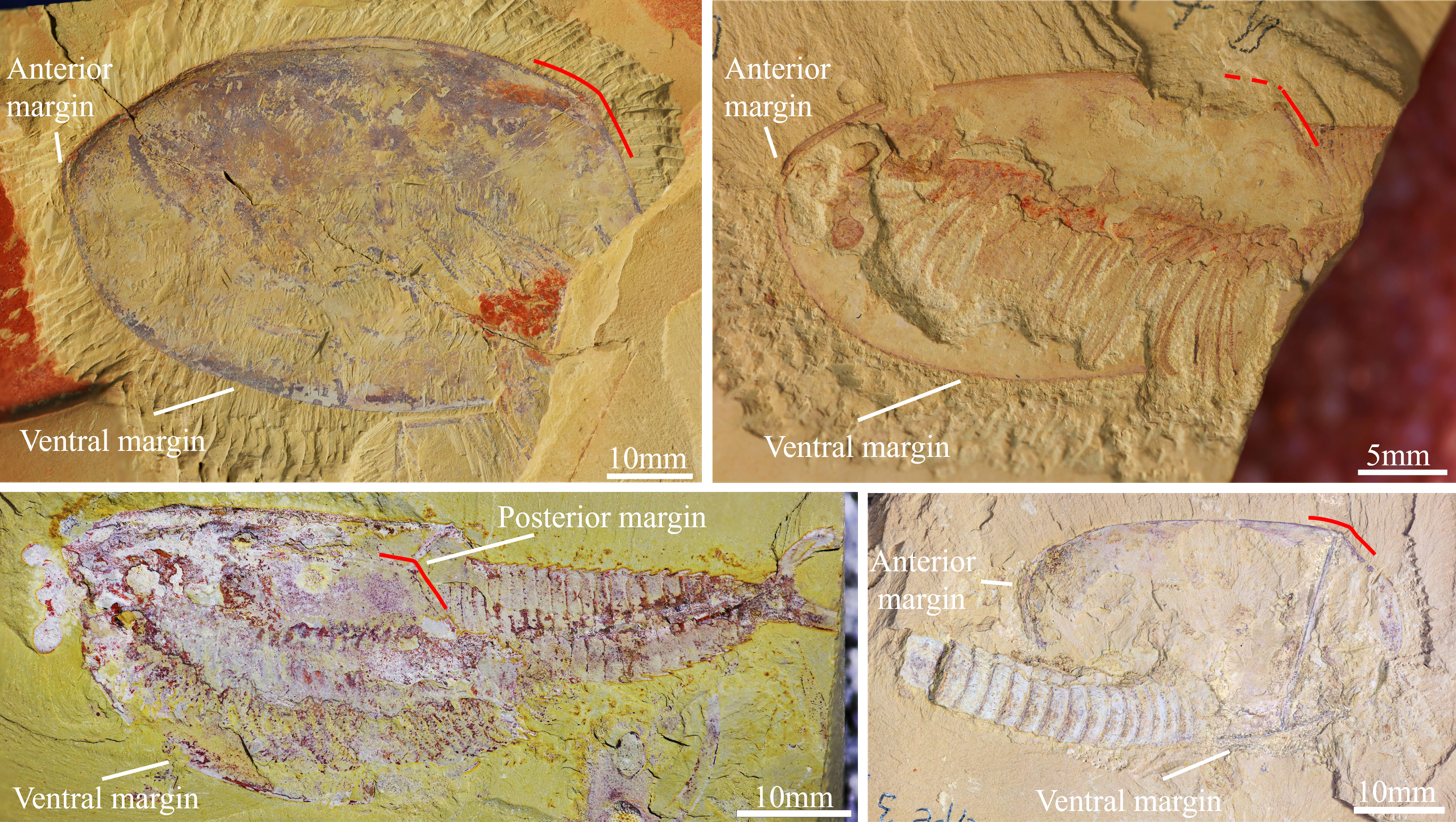
- Pectocaris species. Left to right, top to bottom: P. spatiosa, P. erypetala, P. inopinata, P. paraspatiosa

Scientific classification
- Kingdom: Animalia
- Phylum: Arthropoda
- Order: †Hymenocarina
- Family: †Pectocarididae
- Genus: †Pectocaris; Hou et al., 1999

Type species
- Pectocaris spatiosa Hou et al., 1999

Species
- P. eurypetala (Hou and Sun, 1987); P. inopinata Jin et al., 2021; P. paraspatiosa Jin et al., 2024; P. spatiosa Hou et al., 1999

Synonyms
- Synonyms of P. eurypetala: Odaraia? eurypetala Hou and Sun, 1987

= Pectocaris =

Pectocaris Temporal range: Cambrian Stage 3

Extinct genus of crustaceans

Pectocaris is an extinct genus of bivalved arthropods from the Cambrian Maotianshan Shales, Yunnan Province of China. There are currently four known species within the genus.

== Discovery ==
The first species of the genus, Pectocaris spatiosa, was described in 1999 from fossils of the Maotianshan Shales; however, these were not the first fossils of the genus to be extracted from the formation, as partial hymenocarine fossils described as belonging to the genus Odaraia (Odaraia? eurypetala) were described in 1987. Since these fossils were partially preserved, they were not recognised as part of a different genus until 2004, keeping their species name, erecting Pectocaris euryptela. The final species, Pectocaris inopinata was not described until 2021. All species come from the Yu'anshan Member of the Chiungchussu Formation.

The genus' name, Pectocaris, comes from Latin pecto, "comb"; and caris, "shrimp" or "crab".

== Description and species ==
Pectocaris possessed a fused bivalved carapace, covering about half of the total body length; out of which were a pair of pedunculate eyes, both antennae and part of the head. They had triangular-shaped mandibles. They had a multisegmented body, with pairs of limbs across it; only the cephalothorax had biramic appendages, the rest of them possessing a multisegmented endopod and a flap-shaped exopod, bordered by marginal setae, much like their antennae. Their body ended in a long telson, with a pair of fins forming a crescent moon shape.

=== Pectocaris spatiosa ===
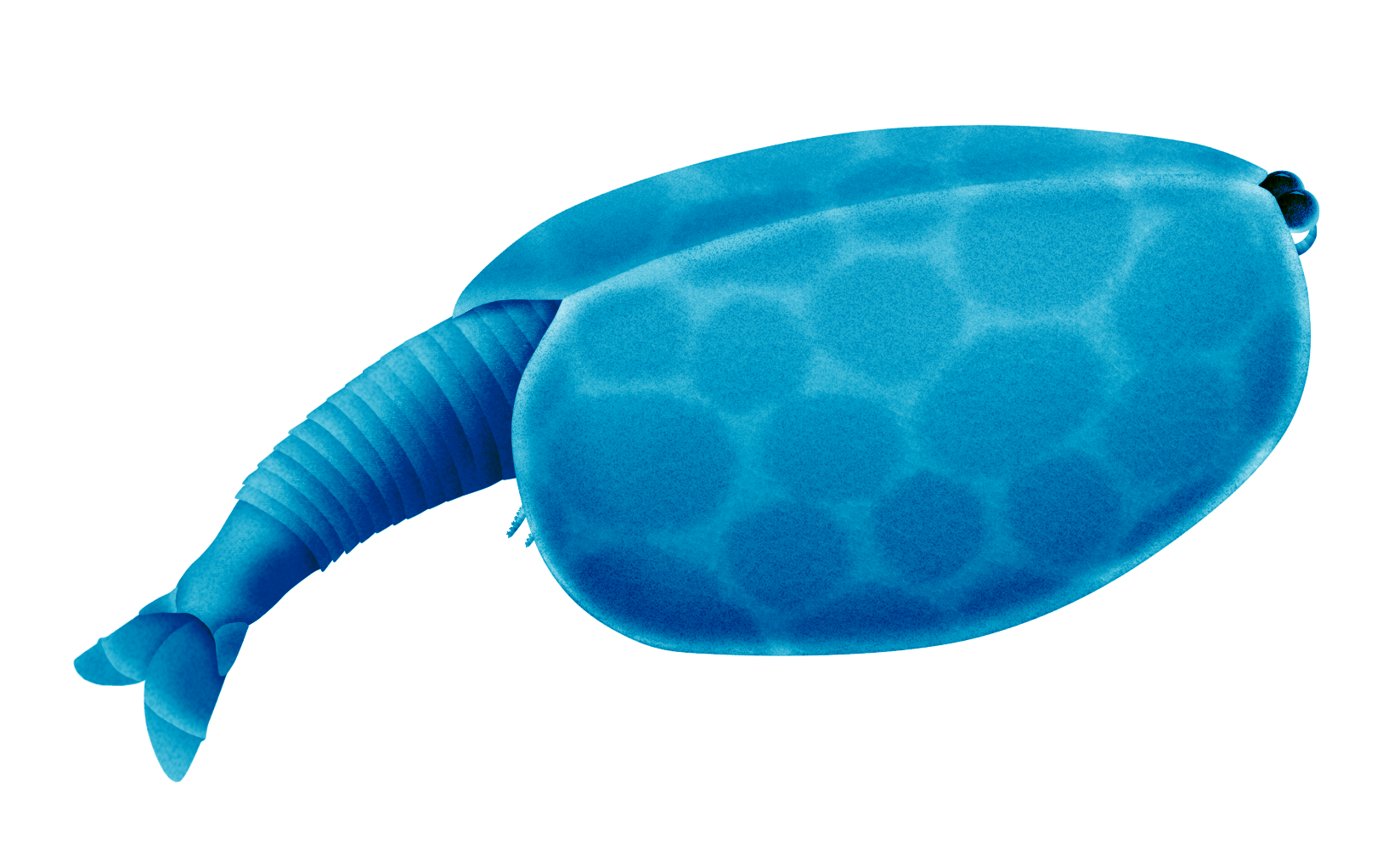
Life restoration of P. spatiosa

The type and largest species, surpassing 10 centimetres (0.33 feet) in length. It possessed about 50 body segments, each one accompanied by its own pair of limbs. The cephalothoracic appendages were relatively thin and their antennae were the shortest proportionally.

The species' name comes from Latin, meaning "spacious".

=== Pectocaris eurypetala ===
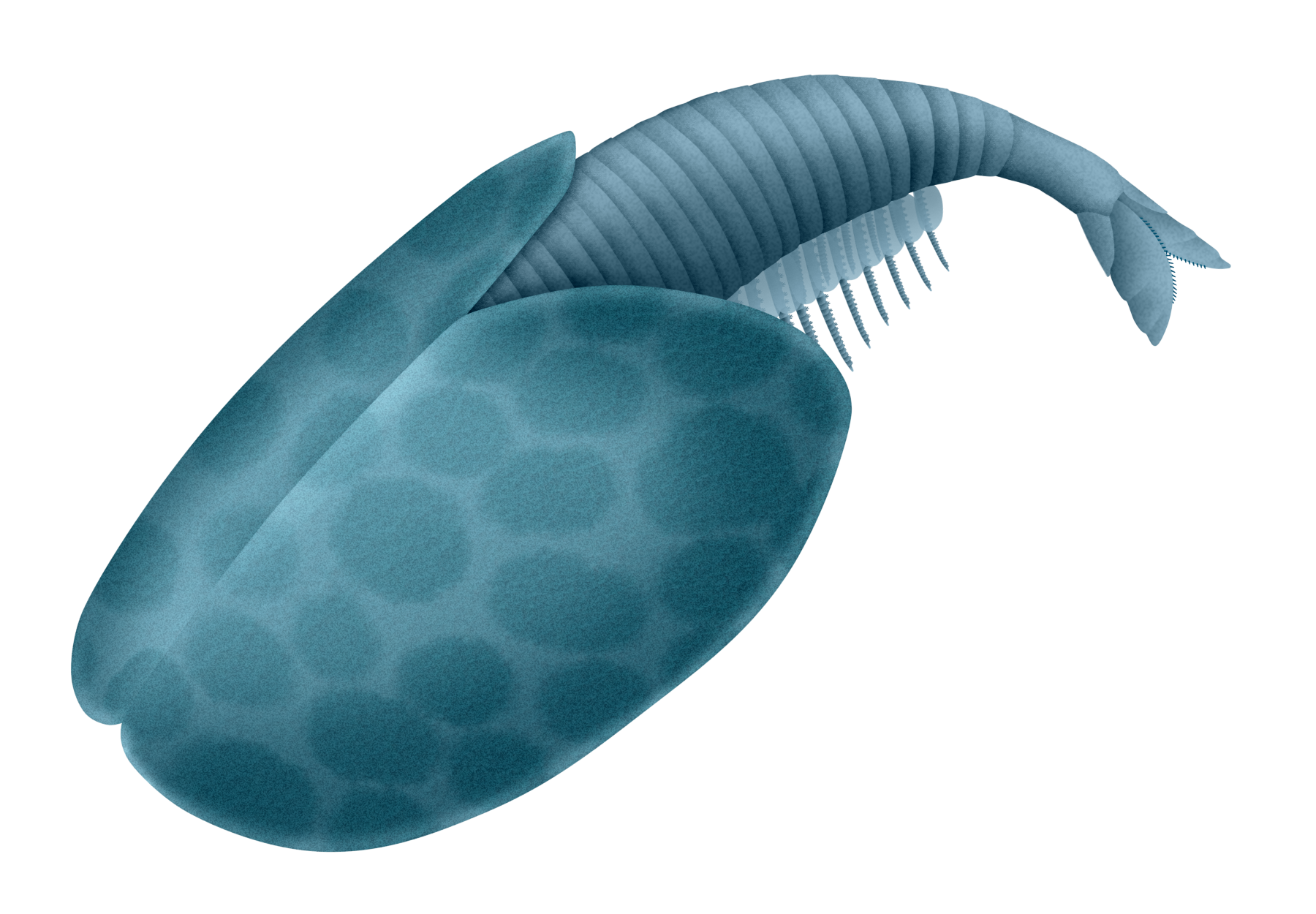
Life restoration of P. eurypetala

P. eurypetala was the mid-sized species, measuring about 4.5 centimetres (0.15 feet) long. It possessed about 53 body segments, each one accompanied by its own pair of limbs. The cephalothoracic appendages were relatively thin, with endites, their antennae were the thinnest proportionally.

The species' name comes from Latin eury, "wide", and Greek petala, "petals"; meaning "wide petals", referring to their bivalved carapace.

=== Pectocaris inopinata ===
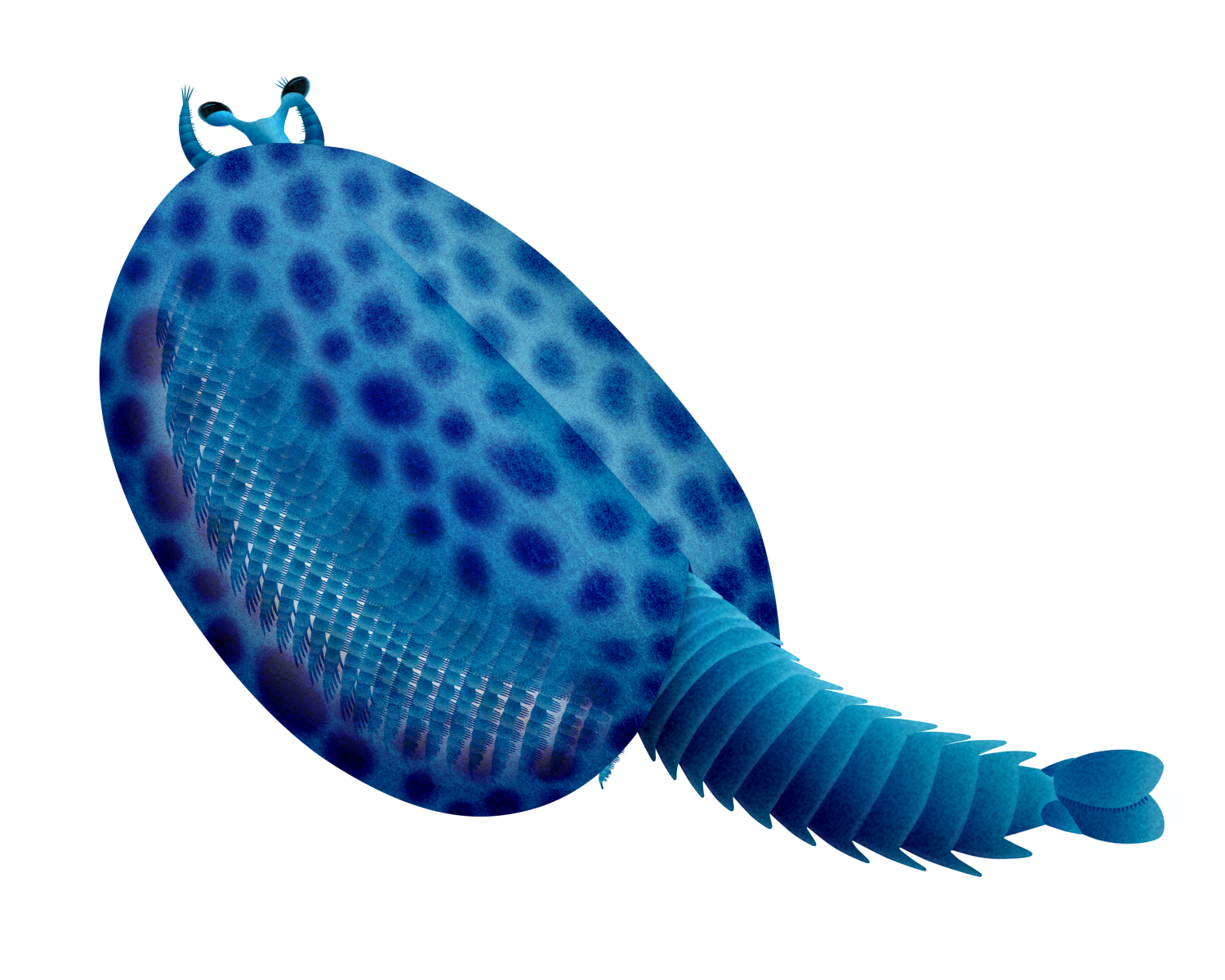
Life restoration of P. inopinata

The smallest species in the genus, barely reaching 3.7 centimetres (0.12 feet). It possessed about 41-46 body segments, only 29 of them possessed limbs. The cephalothoracic appendages were relatively strong, with endites and a claw; their antennae were the most robust, proportionally.

The species' name comes from Latin inopinans, "unexpected", since the authors were not expecting to find fossils from this rare genus, and because, since they lacked microscopes in the field, they were unable to identify them as a new species,

=== Pectocaris paraspatiosa ===
This species, unlike other Pectocaris species, lacks a tapering abdomen, being approximately equally wide throughout its length. The endopods of the limbs have at least 24 podomeres.

== Ecology ==
Species of Pectocaris are thought to have been active swimmers. P. paraspatiosa, P. spatiosa and P. eurypetala have been suggested to be filter feeders, using the setae on the endites of their limbs to filter out matter from the water column, while P. inopinata has been suggested to be a predator, using its spinose antennae to capture prey.

== Taxonomy ==
Pectocaris has been generally recovered as closely related to other bivalved arthropods such as Odaraia and Jugatacaris, with some studies including it within the clade Hymenocarina.

== See also ==
- Arthropod
- Cambrian explosion
- Chengjiang biota
  - List of Chengjiang Biota species by phylum
