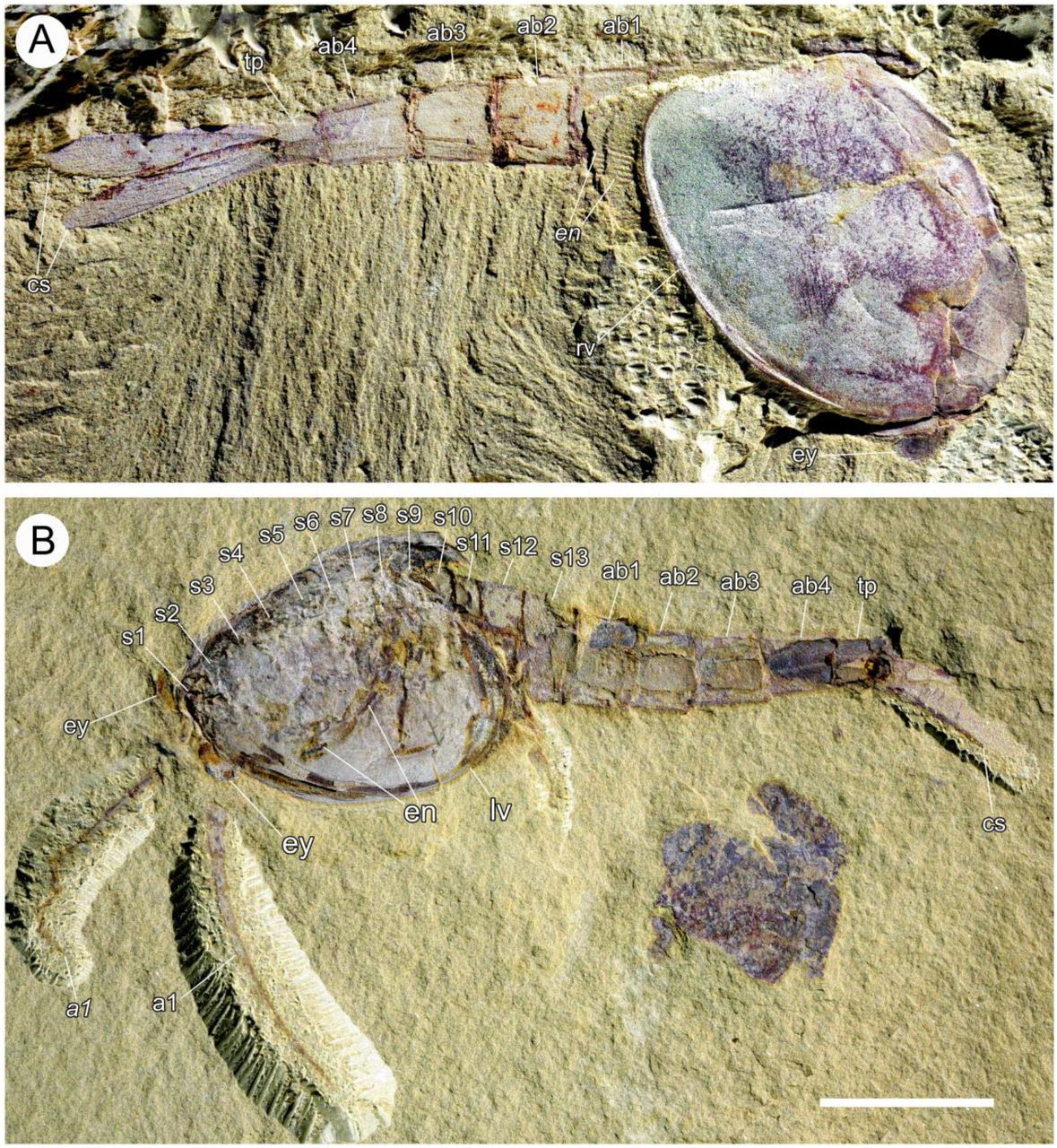
- Fossils of C. ovata
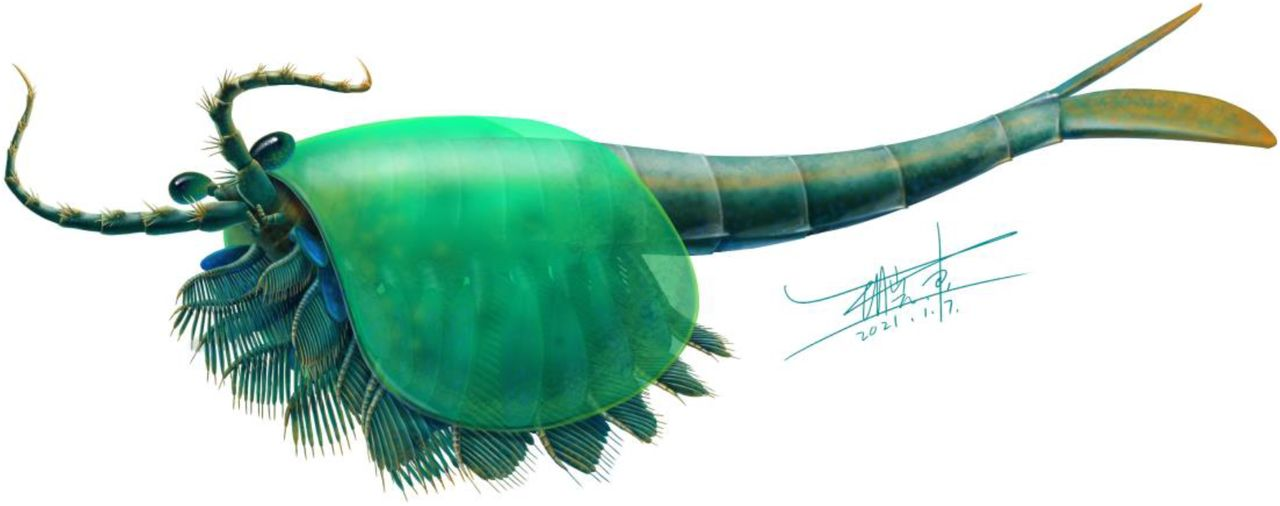
- Reconstruction

Scientific classification
- Kingdom: Animalia
- Clade: Panarthropoda
- Phylum: Arthropoda
- Class: incertae sedis
- Genus: †Chuandianella; Hou and Bergström, 1991
- Species: †C. ovata

Binomial name
- †Chuandianella ovata (Li, 1975)

Synonyms
- Mononotella ovata (Li, 1975); Waptia ovata (Li, 1975)

= Chuandianella =

Chuandianella Temporal range: Cambrian Stage 3 520–516 Ma

Extinct genus of Cambrian animals

Chuandianella ovata is an extinct bivalved arthropod that lived during Cambrian Stage 3 of the Early Cambrian (about 520 to 516 million years ago). It is the only species classified under the genus Chuandianella. Its fossils were recovered from the Chengjiang Biota in Yunnan, China.

== Taxonomy ==
It was originally described in 1975 under the "ostracod"-like genus Mononotella, as Mononotella ovata. In 1991, the paleontologists Hou Xian-guang and Jan Bergström reclassified it under the new genus Chuandianella when additional discoveries of more complete specimens made its resemblance to Waptia fieldensis more apparent. In 2004, paleontologist Jun-Yuan Chen tentatively transferred it to the genus Waptia. However, C. ovata had eight abdominal somites in contrast to five in W. fieldensis. Its limbs were biramous and were undifferentiated, unlike those of W. fieldensis. Other authors deemed these differences to be enough to separate it from Waptia to its own genus. In 2022, a detailed restudy was published, which rejected Chuandianella from Hymenocarina, the group that includes Waptia, because of the absence of mandibles and maxillae, and was instead considered an "upper stem-group arthropod" as opposed to the more derived mandibulate hymenocarines. However, the study affirmed that it was at least an antennulate.

== Description ==
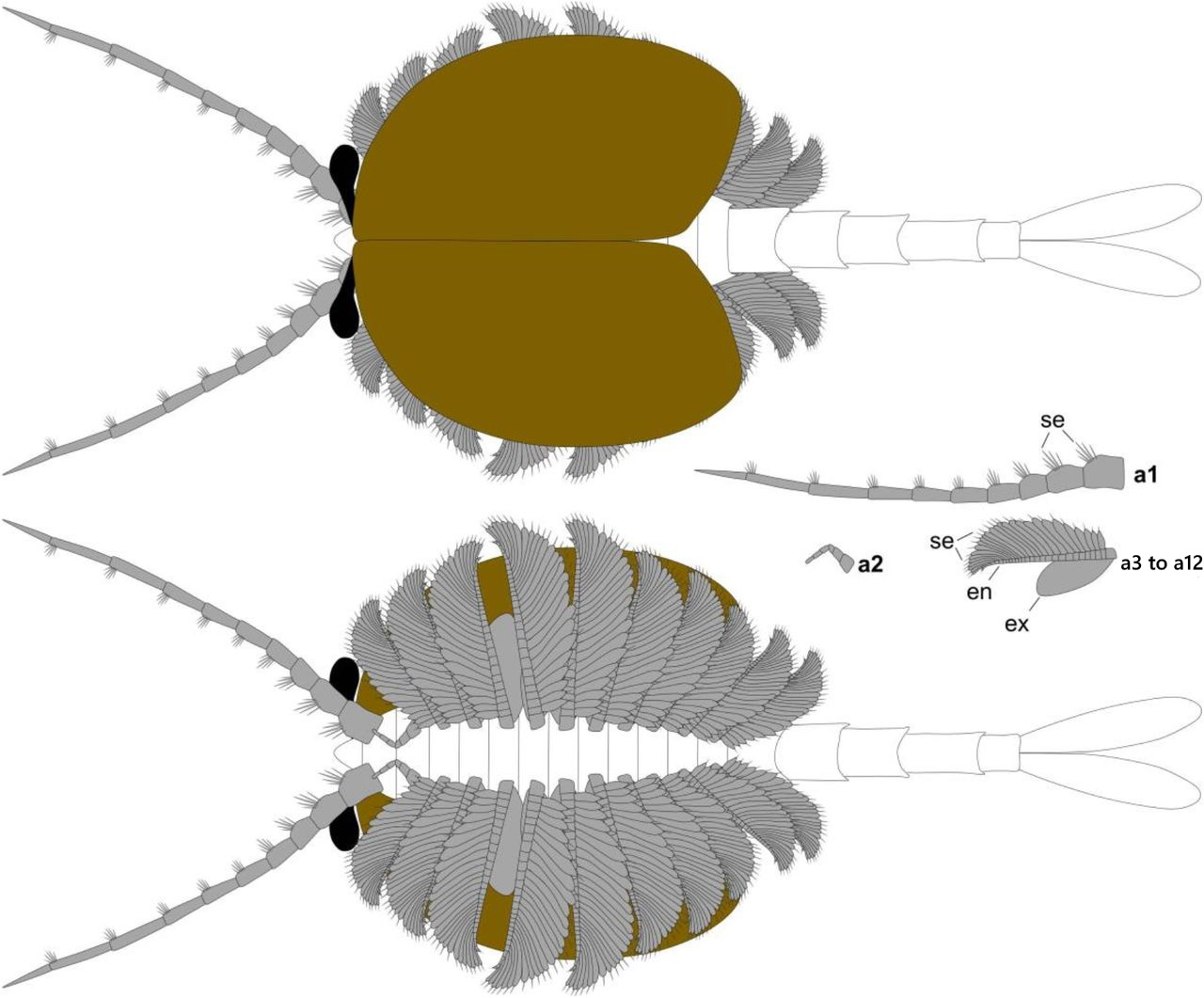
Diagram

Specimens of Chuandianella reach a total body length of up to 30 millimetres (1.2 in). Chuandianella ovata had a bivalved carapace up to 14.5 millimetres (0.57 in) long with a medial fold line. The carapace was composed of calcium phosphate. The head had a pair of stalked eyes. The body has at least 18 segments. The first appendage pair is elongate and antenniform with 10 podomeres/segments with each podomere bearing inward-facing setae (hair-like structures), and the second appendage is uniramous (single-branched) and short and has 6 podomeres. These are followed by 10 biramous (two-branched) appendage pairs that are all similar to each other, which have endopods (inner-leg like branches) each with at least 27 podomeres, which have blade-like endites (structures growing from the limbs) projecting perpendicularly from the limb axis, which have been described as "feather like". The exopods (outer limb branch) are short and paddle-shaped. The trunk terminates with a pair of elongate caudal flukes.

== Ecology ==
It has been suggested that it was an active swimmer and a filter feeder, using its feathery endopod endites to capture small food particles from the water column, with the short second appendage used to help process food. Specimens of Chuandianella have been found with up to 100 eggs, each 0.5 millimetres (3/128 in) across, adhered to the inside surface of the bivalved carapace, this is thought to have been a form of brood care to protect the eggs against predators.

== See also ==
- Waptia
- List of Chengjiang Biota species by phylum
- Burgess Shale
- Burgess shale type preservation
