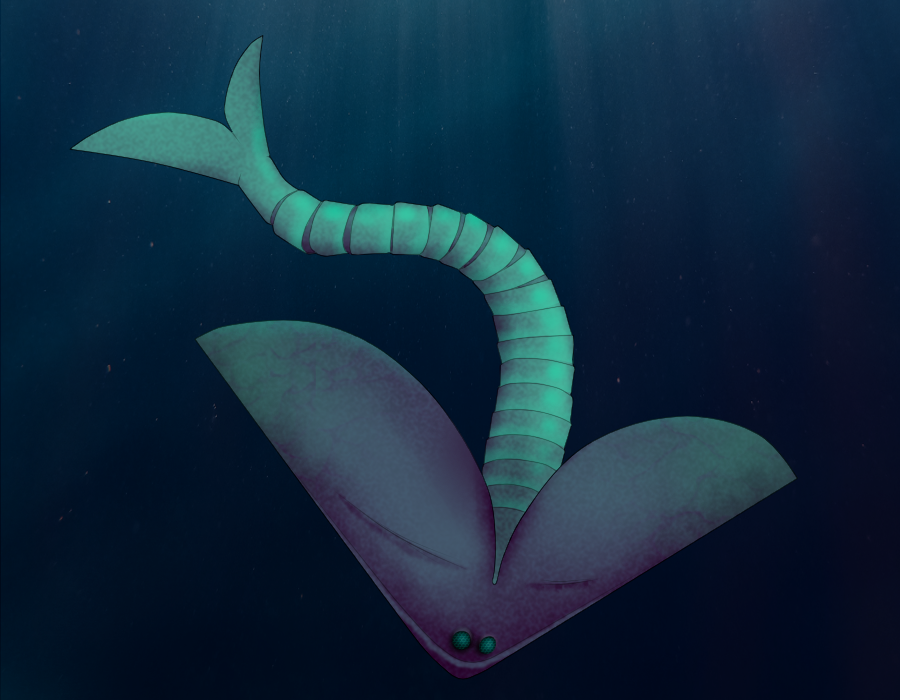
- Life restoration

Scientific classification
- Kingdom: Animalia
- Phylum: Arthropoda
- Genus: †Erjiecaris; Fu, Zhang and Budd, 2014
- Species: †E. minusculo

Binomial name
- †Erjiecaris minusculo Fu, Zhang and Budd, 2014

= Erjiecaris =

Erjiecaris Temporal range: Cambrian Stage 3

Extinct genus of arthropod

Erjiecaris Is an extinct genus of bivalved Cambrian arthropod, known from the Chengjiang Biota of Yunnan, China. It is only known from a single species Erjiecaris minisculo. Around 1 centimetre (0.39 in) long, It has an unusual flattened head-shield, with an elongate body with at least 19 segments and a forked tail similar to Waptia. Unlike most bivalved arthropods, its simple, unstalked eyes are placed on top of the headshield. It was likely a nektobenthic (swimming above ocean floor) deposit feeder. The relationship of Erjiecaris to other arthropods was considered uncertain in its original description. A later study suggested it was a member of Hymenocarina.
