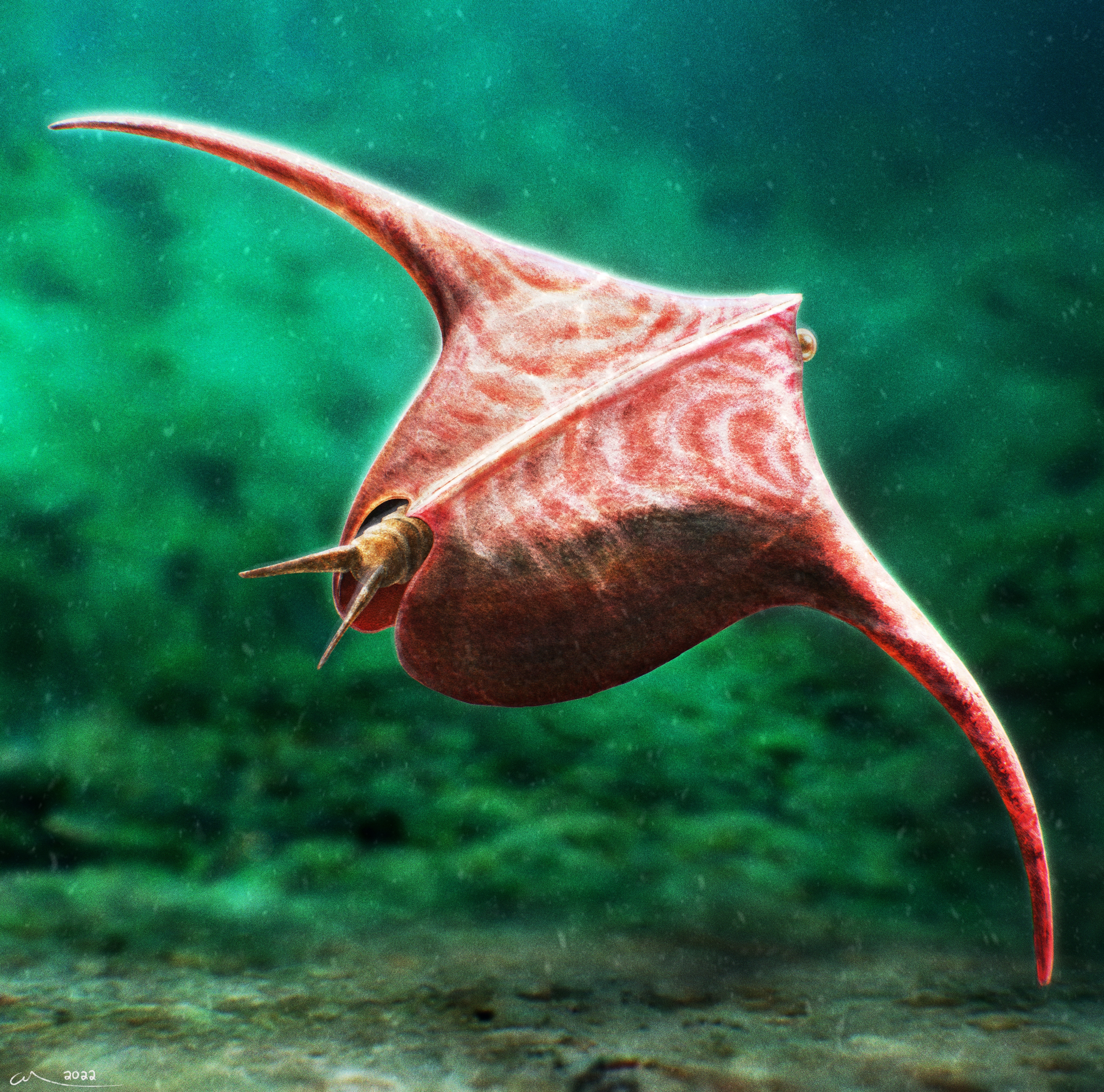
- Life restoration of P. sharpi
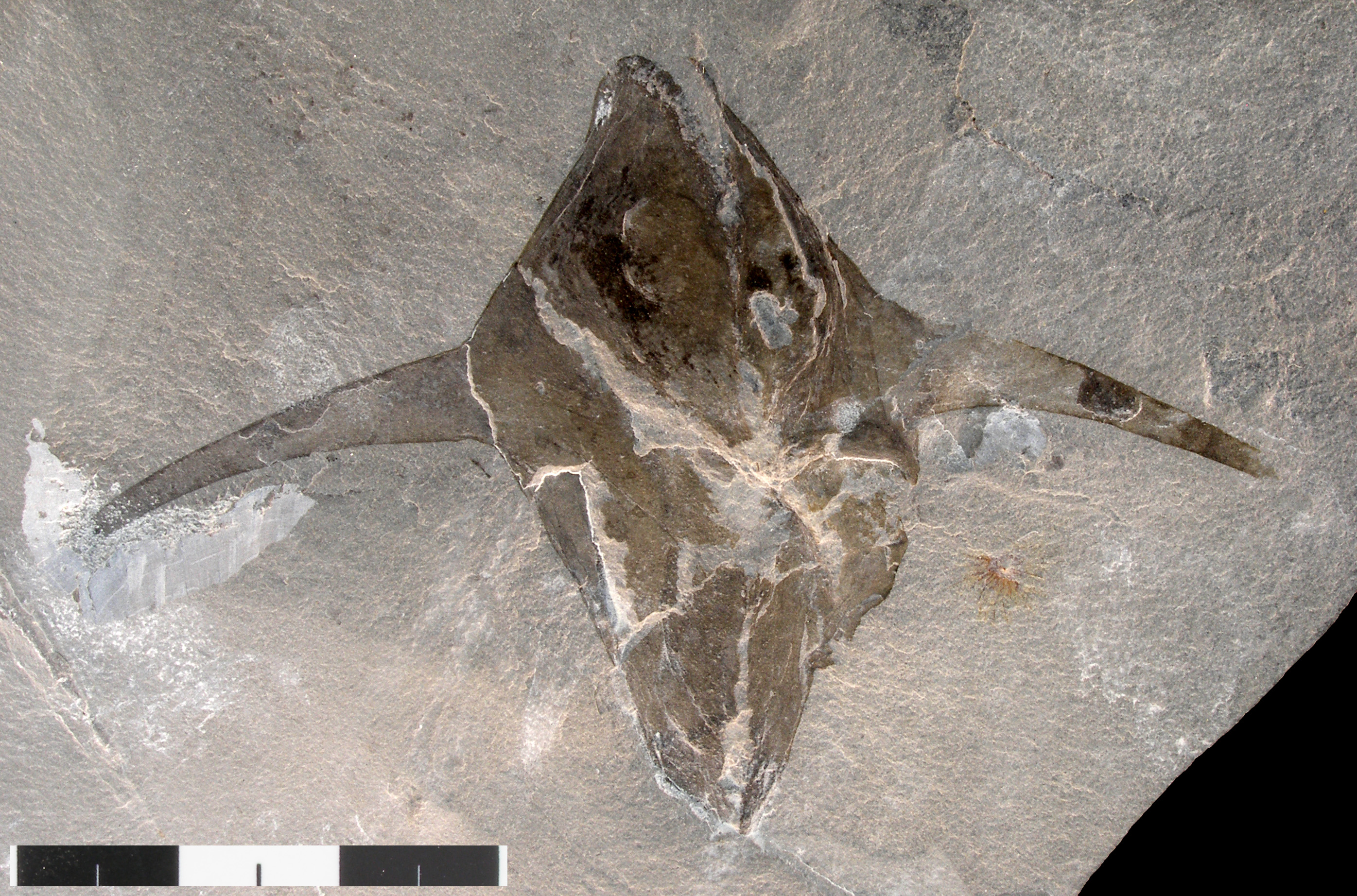
- Fossil of P. sharpi

Scientific classification
- Domain: Eukaryota
- Kingdom: Animalia
- Phylum: Arthropoda
- Genus: †Pseudoarctolepis; Brooks & Caster, 1956

Type species
- Pseudoarctolepis sharpi Brooks & Caster, 1956

Other species
- Pseudoarctolepis semicircularis Yuan et al., 2011

= Pseudoarctolepis =

Pseudoarctolepis Temporal range: Wuliuan–Drumian

Extinct genus of bivalved arthropod

Pseudoarctolepis (meaning "false Arctolepis") is an extinct genus of bivalved arthropod known from the Cambrian period. The type species, P. sharpi was described by Brooks & Caster in 1956 from specimens found in the Wheeler Shale of Utah. It is unusual among Cambrian arthropods for having a pair of wing-like structures projecting outwards from the carapace. A second species, P. semicircularis has been described from the Kaili Biota in South China, which differs from the type species in the fact that the wings are semicircular rather than blade-like. A possible related form has been reported from the Ordovician of Portugal. They were relatively large, with some carapaces of P. sharpi reaching 11 centimetres (4.3 in) in length. The soft-bodied anatomy is poorly known, though the poorly preserved posterior anatomy of a specimen of P. sharpi is known, which consists of a narrow segmented abdomen, which ends with a pair of caudal rami. They are thought to have been actively swimming nektonic organisms. Affinities to the bivalved arthropod group Hymenocarina have been proposed, but the limited knowledge of the anatomy makes the referral tentative.
