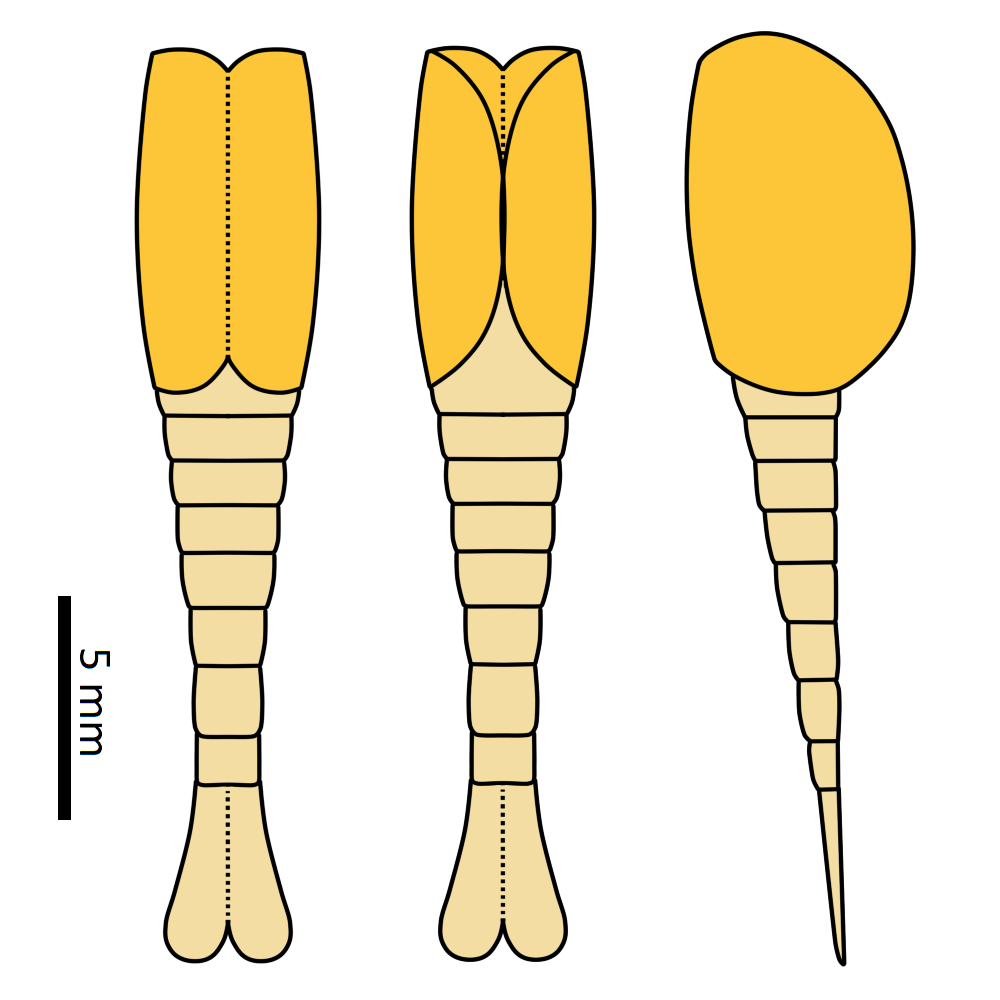

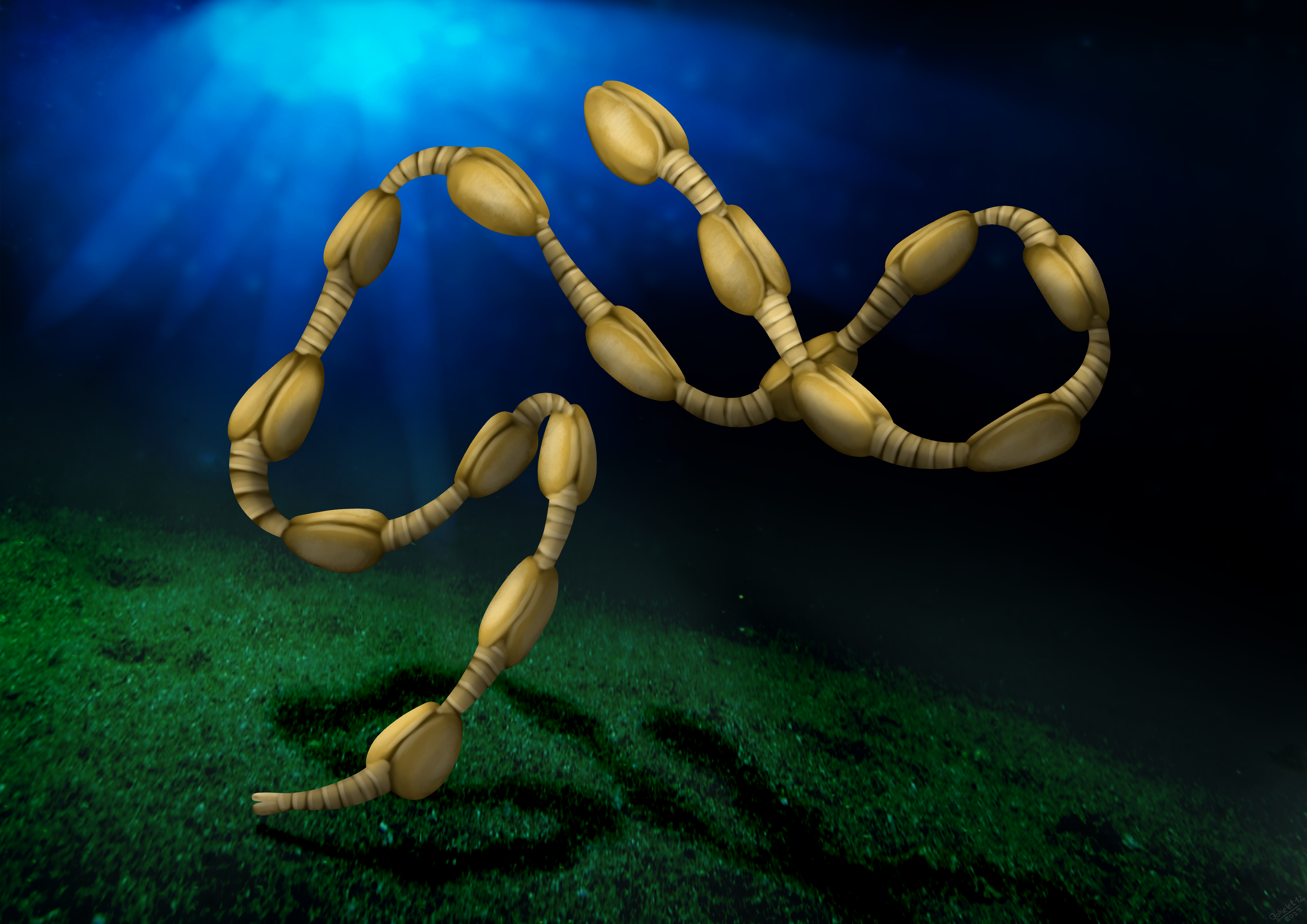
- Restoration of an individual (top) and chain-like association of many individuals (bottom)

Scientific classification
- Kingdom: Animalia
- Phylum: Arthropoda
- Order: †Hymenocarina
- Family: †Waptiidae
- Genus: †Synophalos; Hou, et al. 2009
- Species: †S. xynos

Binomial name
- †Synophalos xynos Hou, et al. 2009

= Synophalos =

Synophalos Temporal range: Cambrian Stage 3

Extinct genus of arthropod

Synophalos is an extinct genus of bivalved arthropod. The genus contains a single species, Synophalos xynos, found in the Cambrian Stage 3-aged Chengjiang biota of Yunnan, China. The body has approximately 6 (possibly 7) abdominal segments, which terminate in a forked unsegmented tail. The holotype specimen is around 2.4 centimetres (0.94 in) long. It is noted for having been found in unusual chain-like associations where up to 20 individuals were connected via the insertion of the tail into the head carapace of the preceding individual. While the linking behaviour of Synophalos is unique among known arthropods living or extinct, other animals do form lines for a variety of purposes, such as the migratory queues of the Caribbean spiny lobster (Palinurus argus). Individuals found in chains are around 5.7 to 8.7 millimetres (0.22 to 0.34 in) in length, smaller than the max size. The purpose of the chaining behaviour in Synophalos is uncertain, but could have served for reproduction, migration, or protection. The authors of the describing paper considered migration the most likely candidate. The describers tentatively referred Synophalos to Waptiidae.

== Etymology ==
Synophalos comes from ancient Greek Synodia meaning "company of travellers" and Hyphalos meaning "under the sea" or "submerged."
