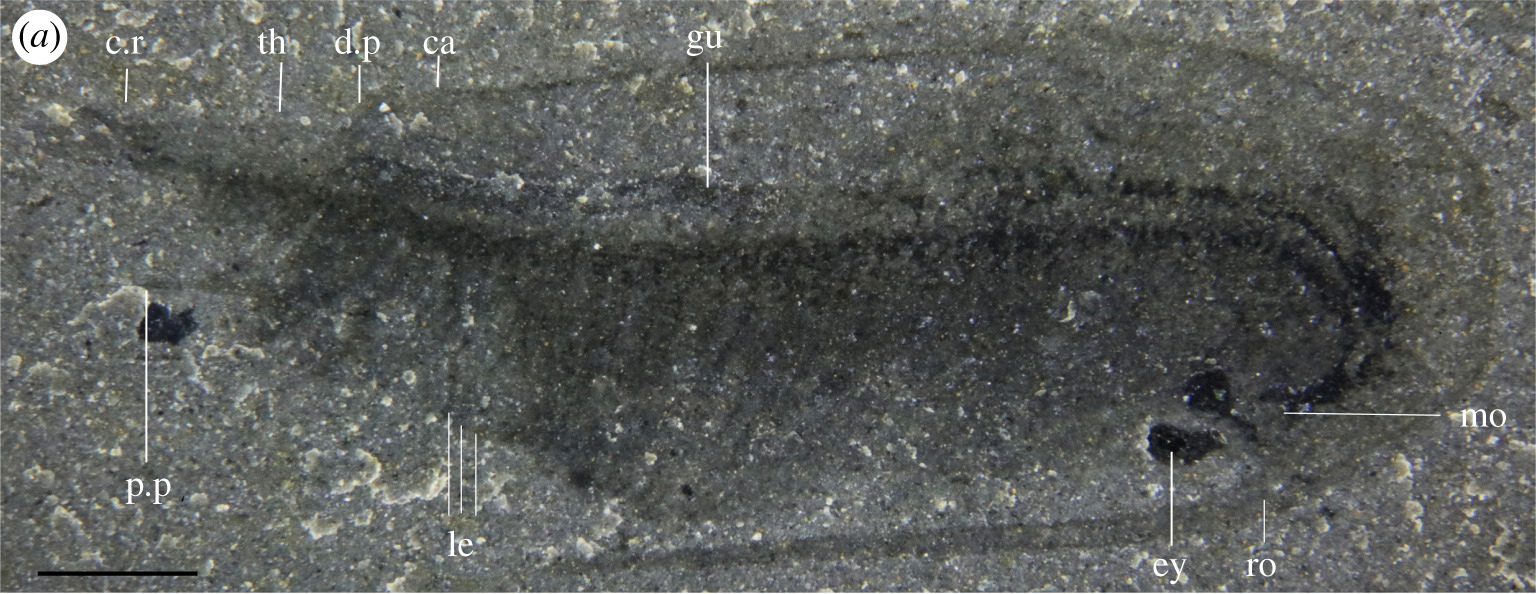
- Holotype specimen of Fibulacaris nereidis (ROMIP 65380)
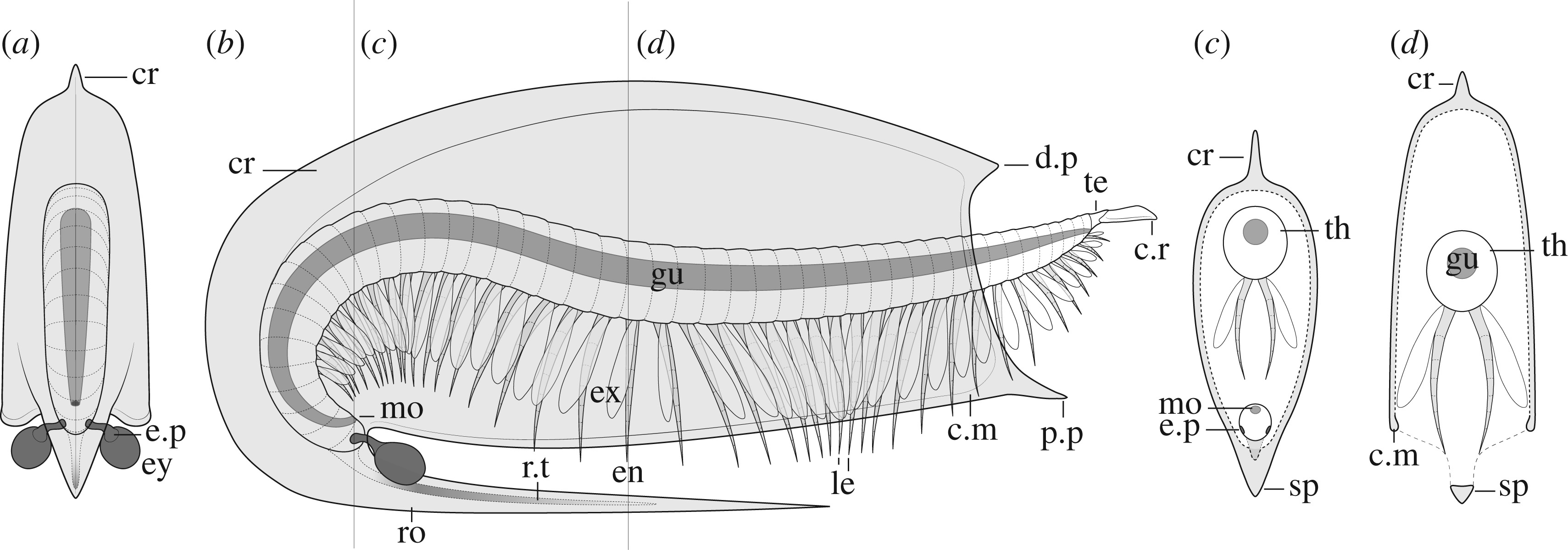
- Diagram

Scientific classification
- Kingdom: Animalia
- Phylum: Arthropoda
- Order: †Hymenocarina
- Genus: †Fibulacaris

= Fibulacaris =

Fibulacaris Temporal range: 518 Ma

Genus of fossil Arthropod

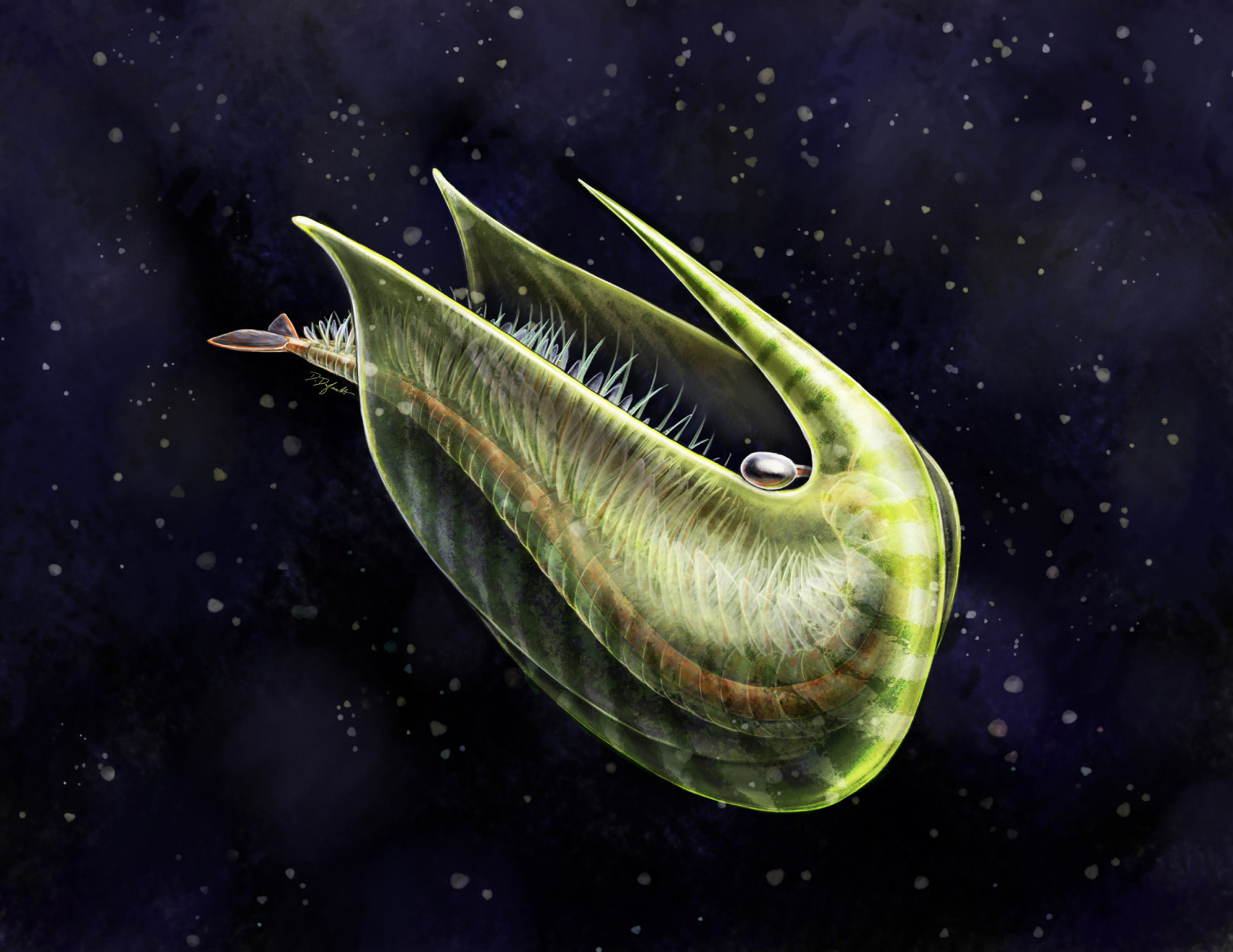
Life restoration

Fibulacaris is a monotypic genus of fossil arthropod known only by one species, Fibulacaris nereidis, discovered from the Cambrian Burgess Shale of Canada. It was characterized by a bivalved carapace with an inverted rostrum, sandwiching the slender body with stalked eyes and homonomous appendages. It was probably an actively swimming filter feeder and possibly swam upside-down like some branchiopod crustaceans and horseshoe crabs. Phylogenetic analysis suggest it was a relative or member of Hymenocarina, which contains other bivalved arthropods.
