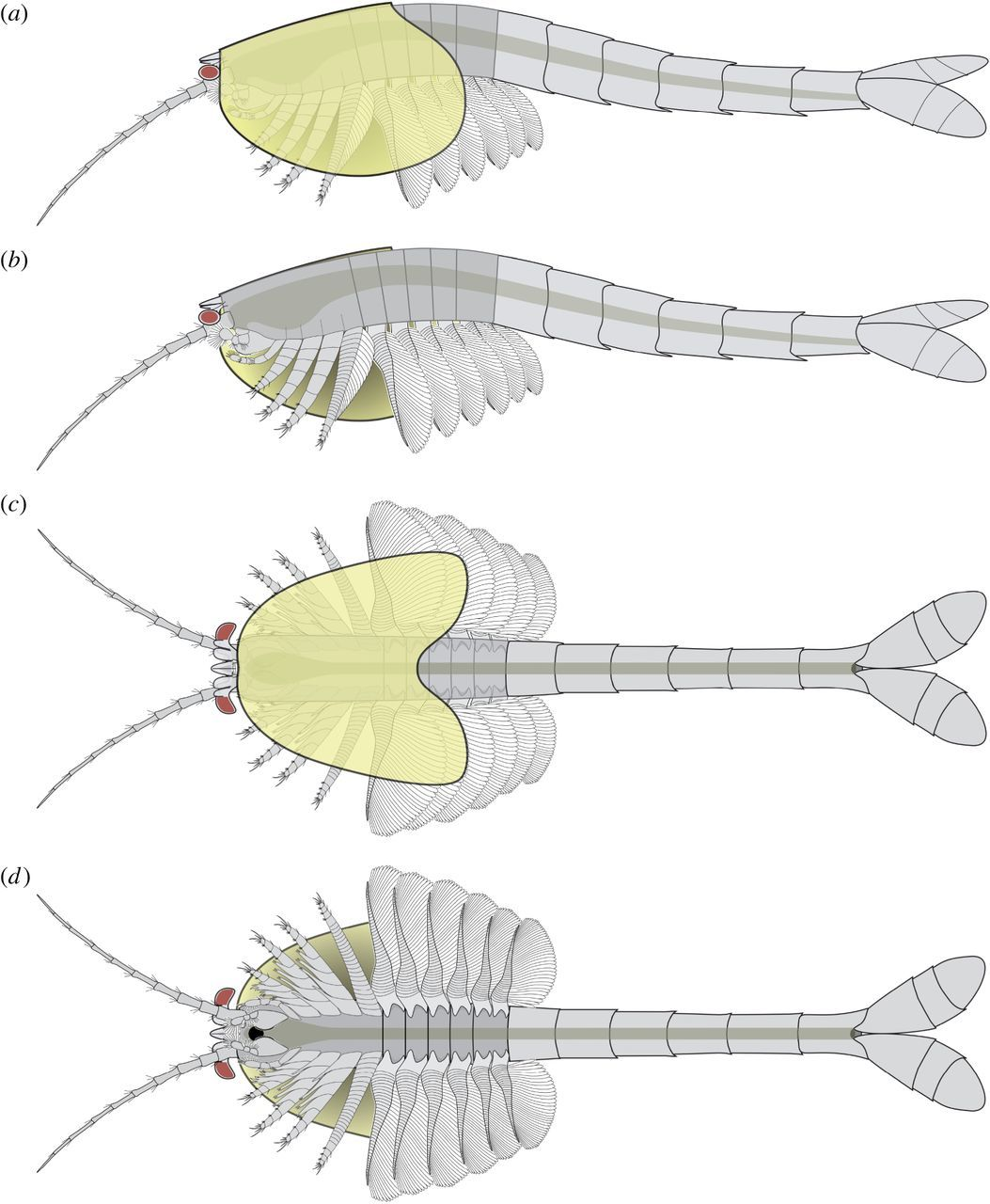
- Diagram of Waptia
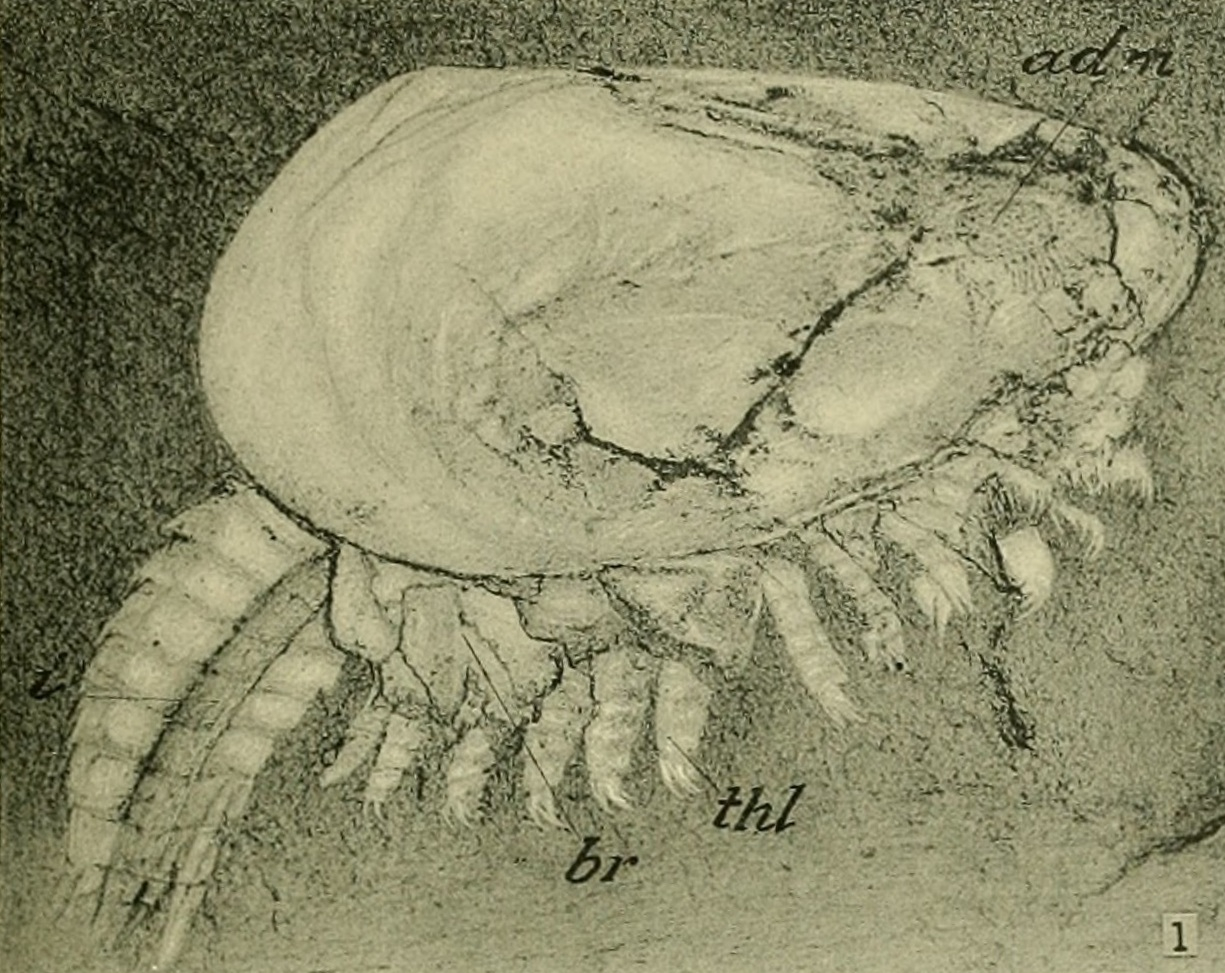
- Fossil of Canadaspis perfecta

Scientific classification
- Kingdom: Animalia
- Phylum: Arthropoda
- Clade: Mandibulata
- Order: †Hymenocarina; Clarke, 1900

Genera
- See text

Synonyms
- Canadaspidida Novozhilov in Orlov, 1960

= Hymenocarina =

Hymenocarina Temporal range: Cambrian

Extinct order of arthropods

Hymenocarina is an order of extinct marine arthropods known from the Cambrian. They possess bivalved carapaces, typically with exposed posteriors. Members of the group are morphologically diverse and had a variety of ecologies, including filter feeders and predators. Recent research has generally considered them to be stem or crown group members of Mandibulata, due to the presence of mandibles in well-preserved species.

== Description ==
Hymenocarines are characterized by the combination of the following characters: bivalved, convex carapace covering cephalothoracic (combined head and thorax) region; cephalothorax bearing multisegmented antennae (though as an exception antennae are absent in Odaraia) and rounded mandibles and likely maxillae, post maxillae limbs with spiny, subdivided basis and endopods (lower, leg-like branches of limbs) with well-developed terminal claws; absence of appendages between antennae and mandibles; median sclerite and lobate protrusions located between compound eyes; and posterior tagma (abdomen) with ring-like segments with the posterior of the body ending with a pair of well-developed caudal rami (often in the form of tail flukes).

The group was very diverse in shape, with some forms like Waptia somewhat resembling shrimp, and others like Odaraia having a large carapace and trifurcate tail. The appendages showing various degrees of specialization across the group, ranging from the feathery gills of Waptia to the robust pincers (chelae) of Tokummia. They also had a wide range of sizes with some like Fibulacaris reaching a length of up to 2 cm (0.79 in) long, while largest Balhuticaris reached 24.5 cm (9.6 in) long. Hymenocarines are thought to have been ecologically diverse, with various forms occupying scavenging, predatory, deposit feeding and suspension feeding niches.

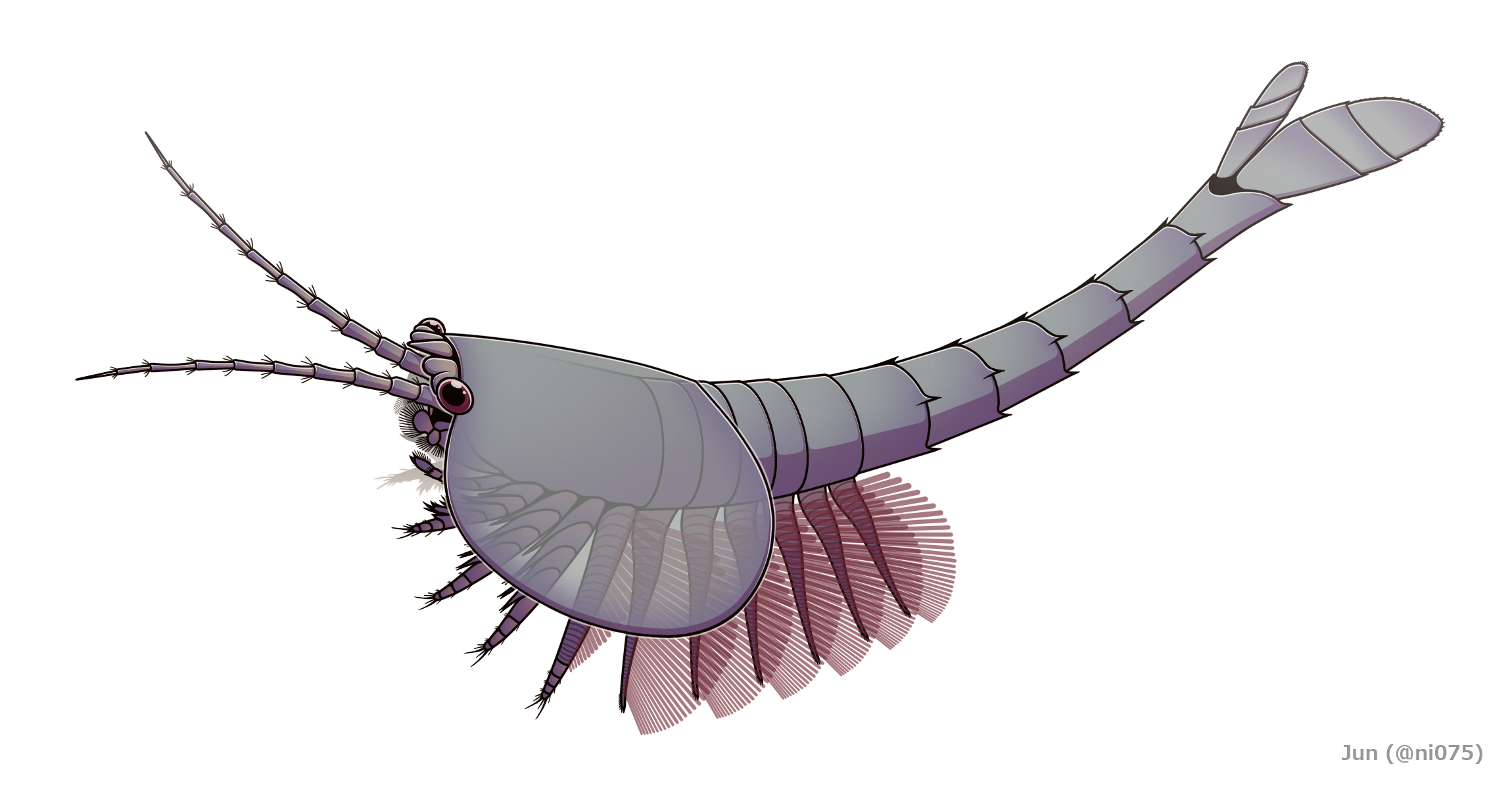
Life restoration of Waptia

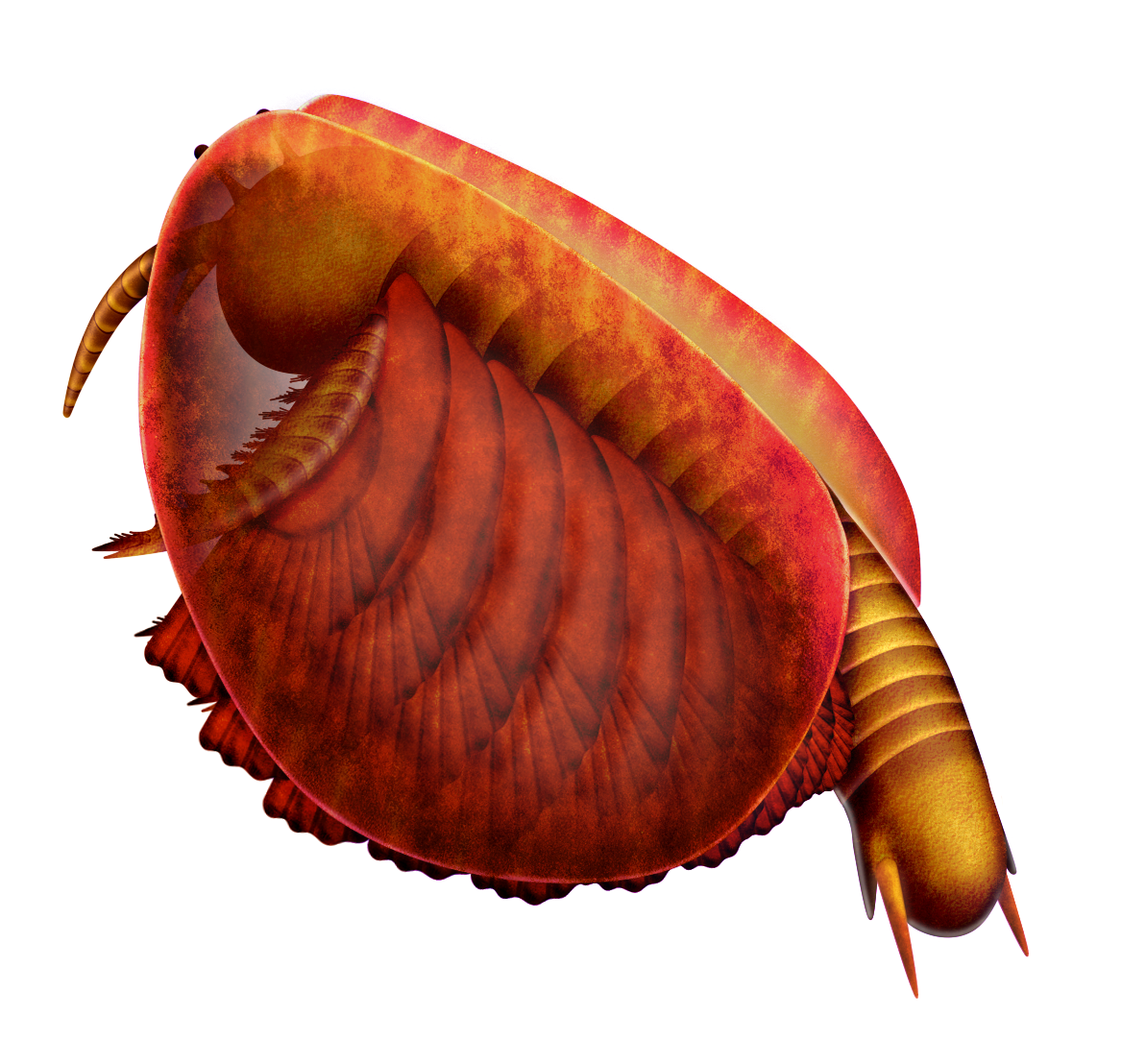
Life restoration of Canadaspis laevigata

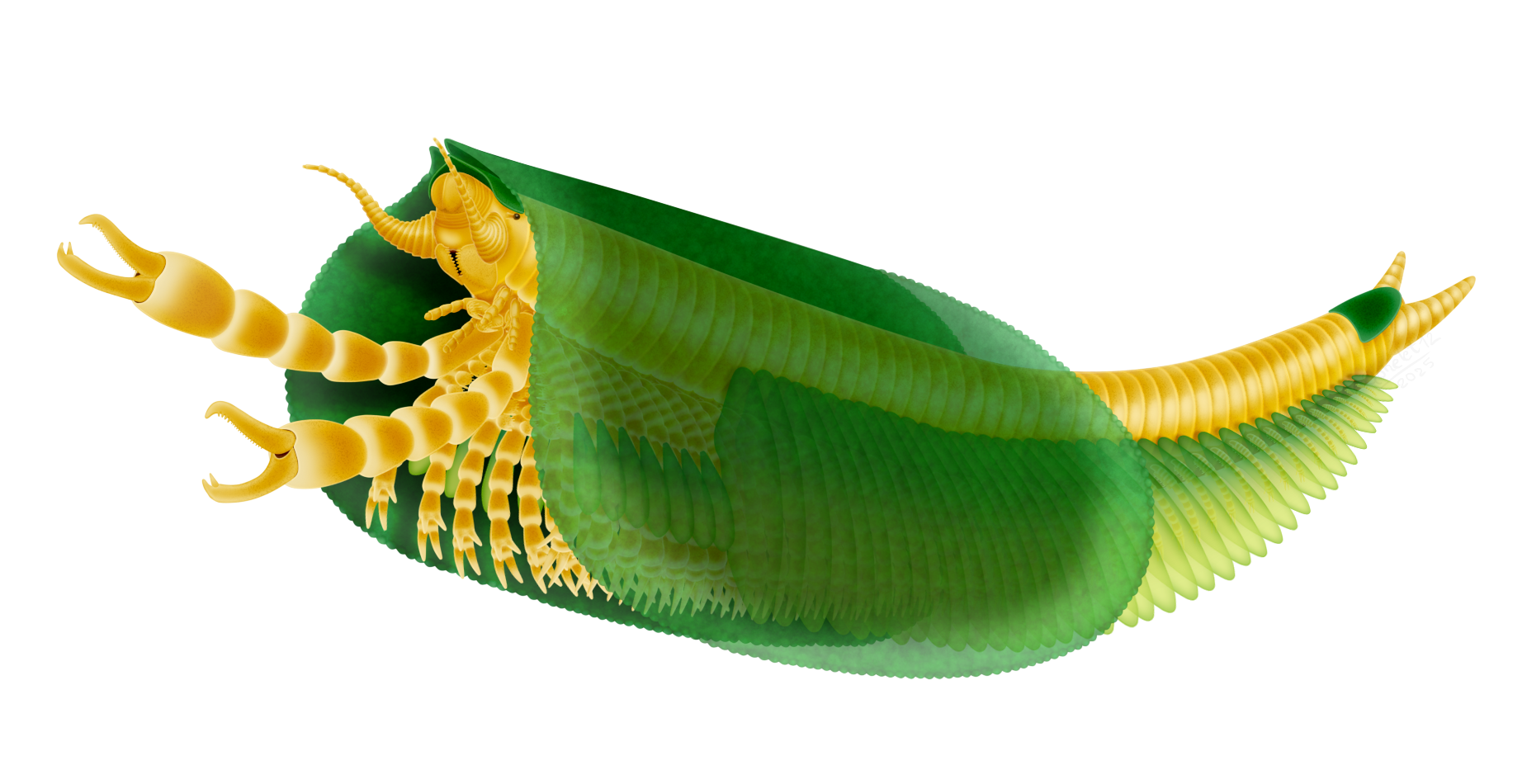
Tokummia is the earliest known animal bearing pincers

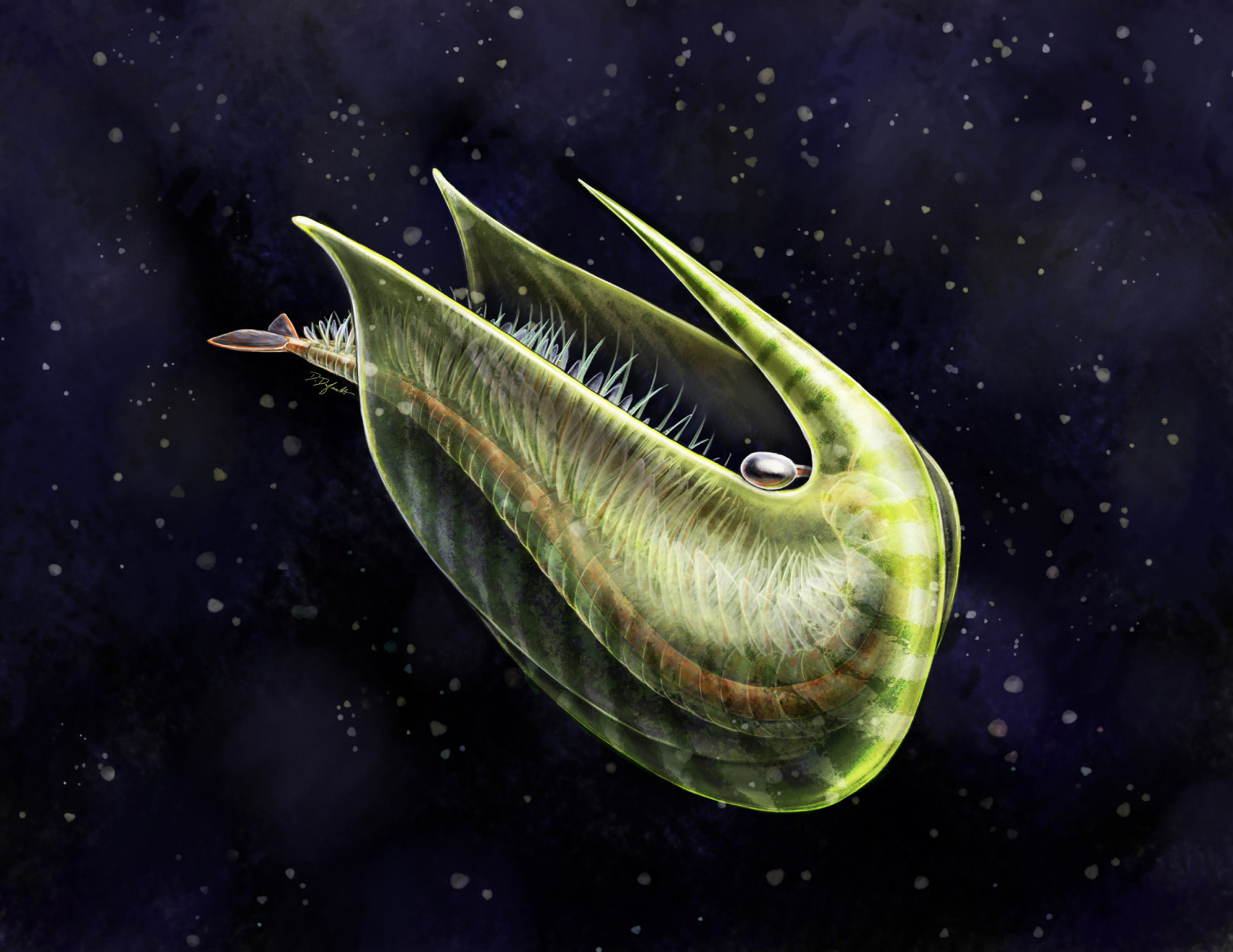
Only 2 cm-long Fibulacaris is suggested to have swum upside down

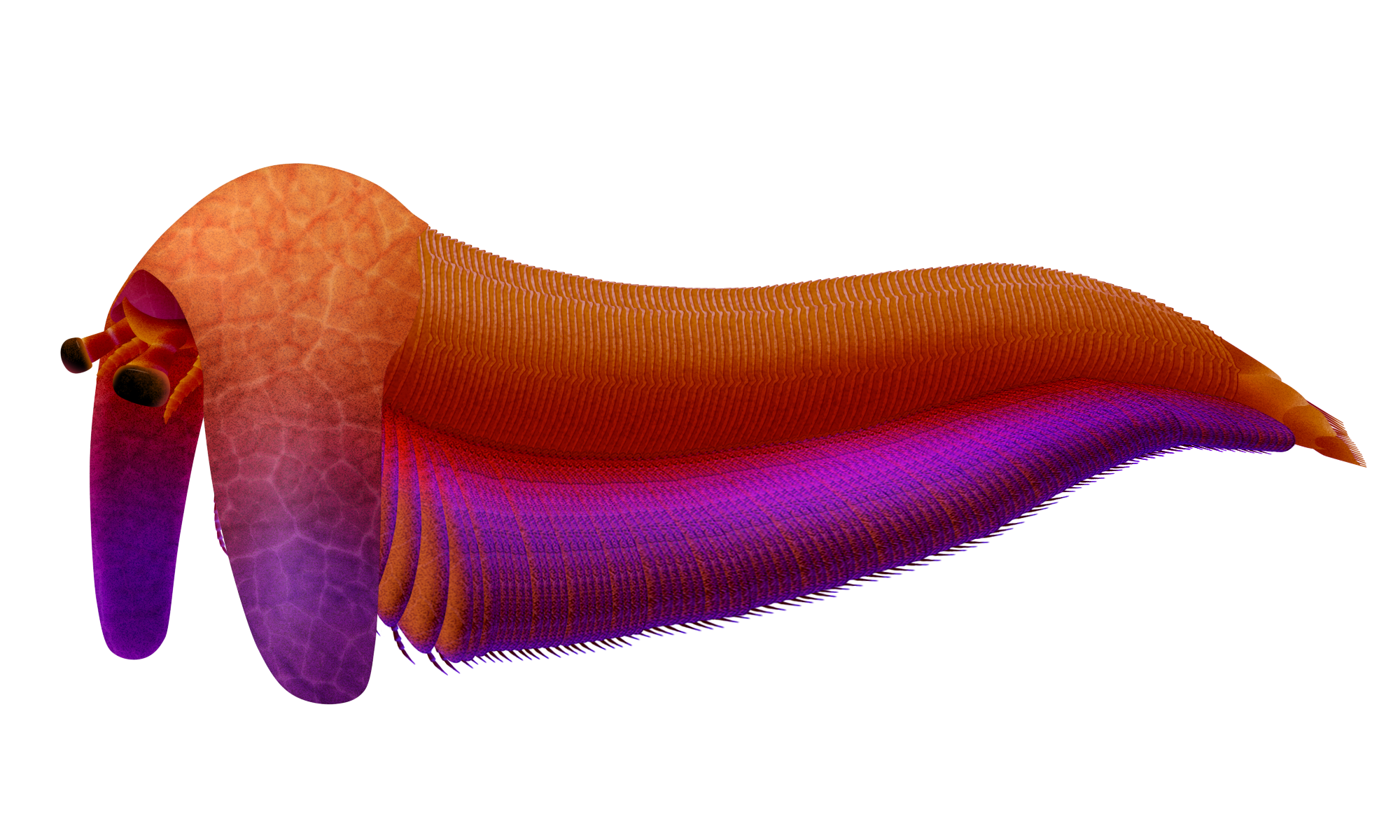
Large-sized Balhuticaris shows extreme multisegmentation with over 100 segments

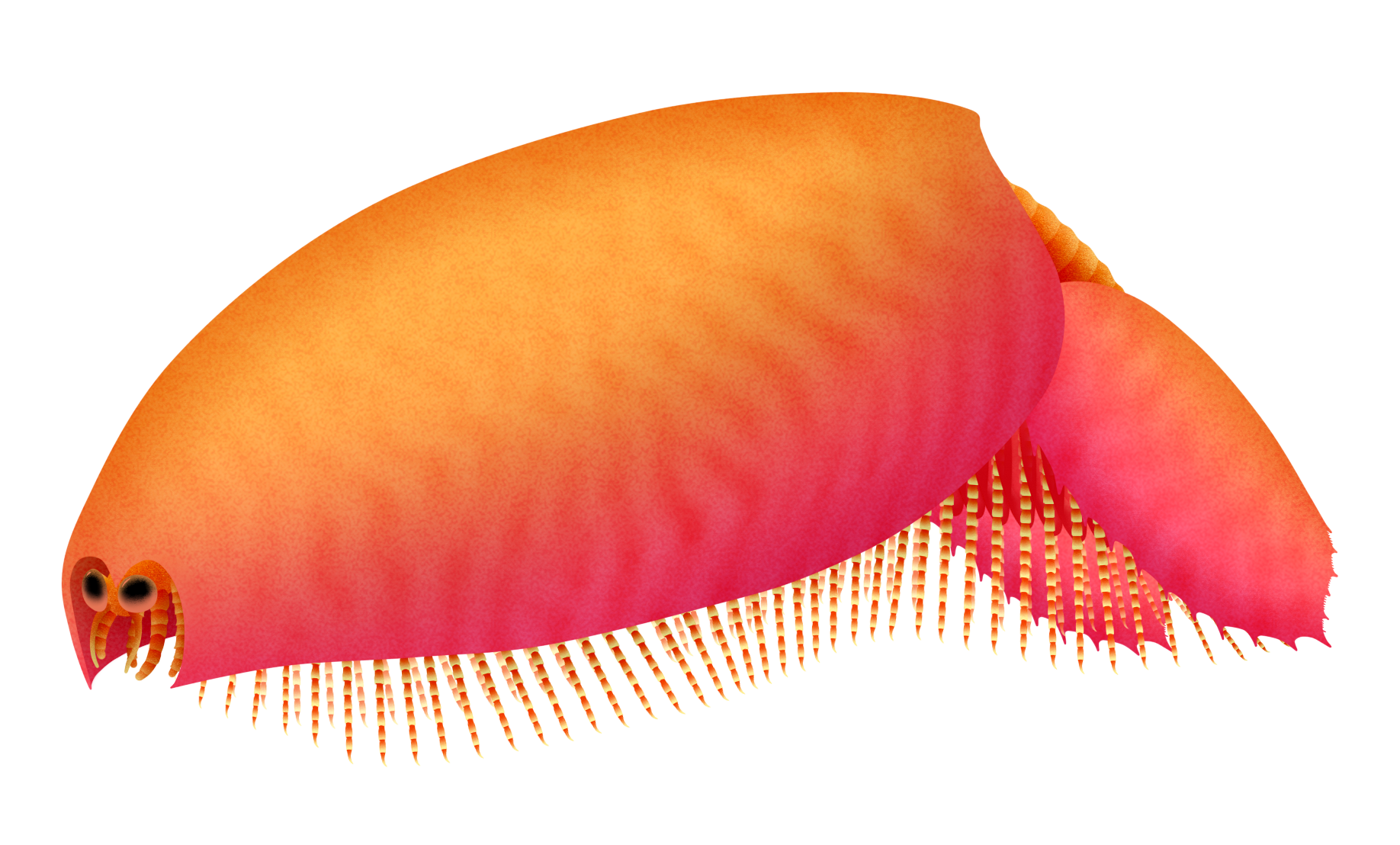
Unlike other hymenocarines, Pakucaris had a separate pygidium carapace covering its posterior

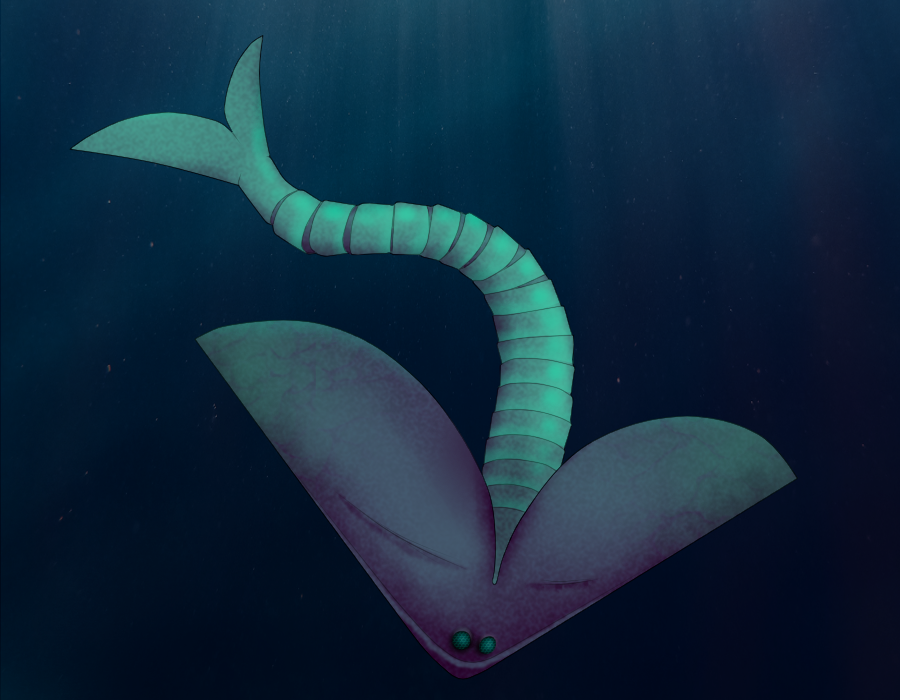
Unlike other taxa, eyes of possible hymenocarine Erjiecaris were probably placed over carapace

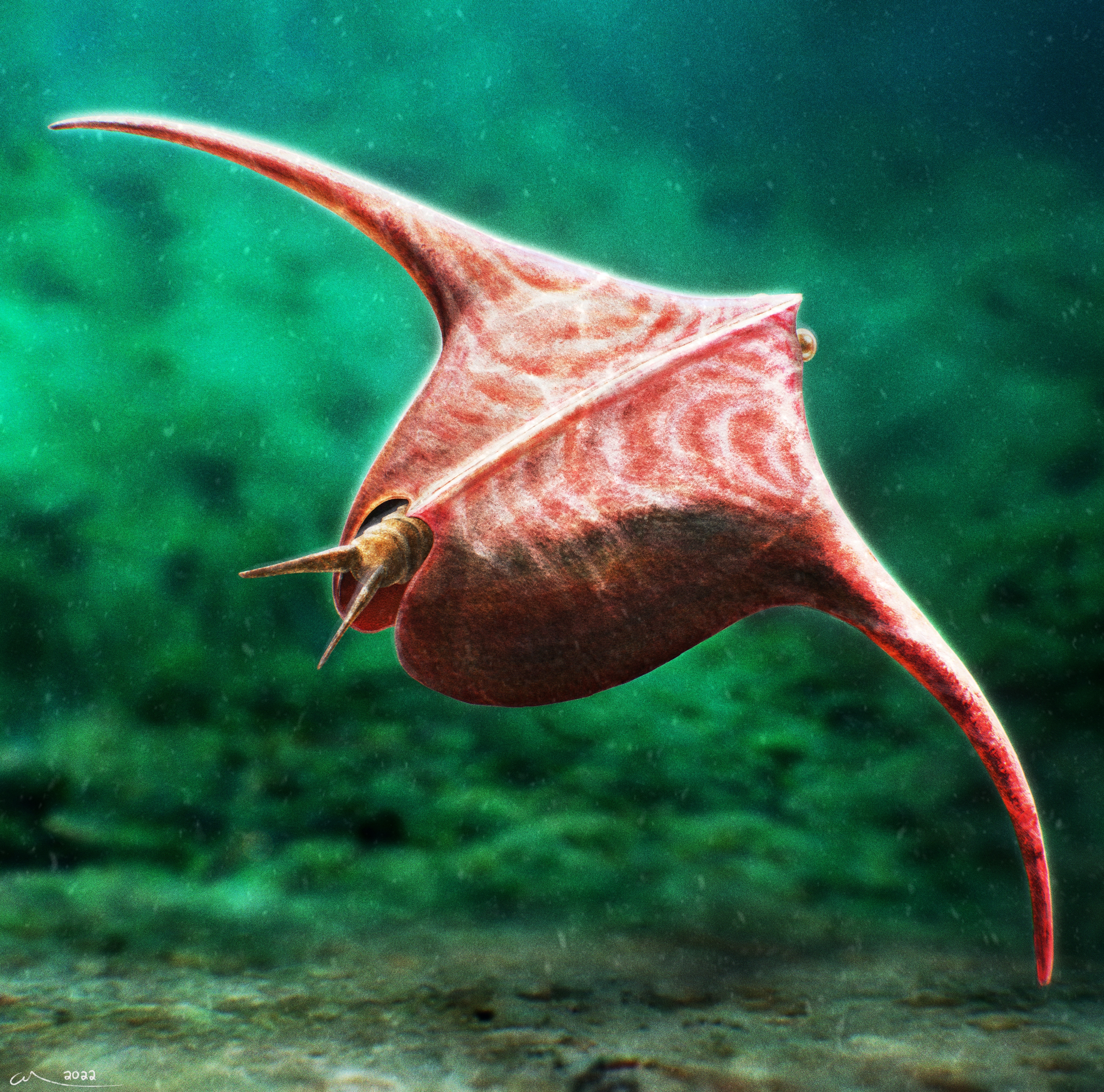
The carapace of possible hymenocarine Pseudoarctolepis had wing-like projections

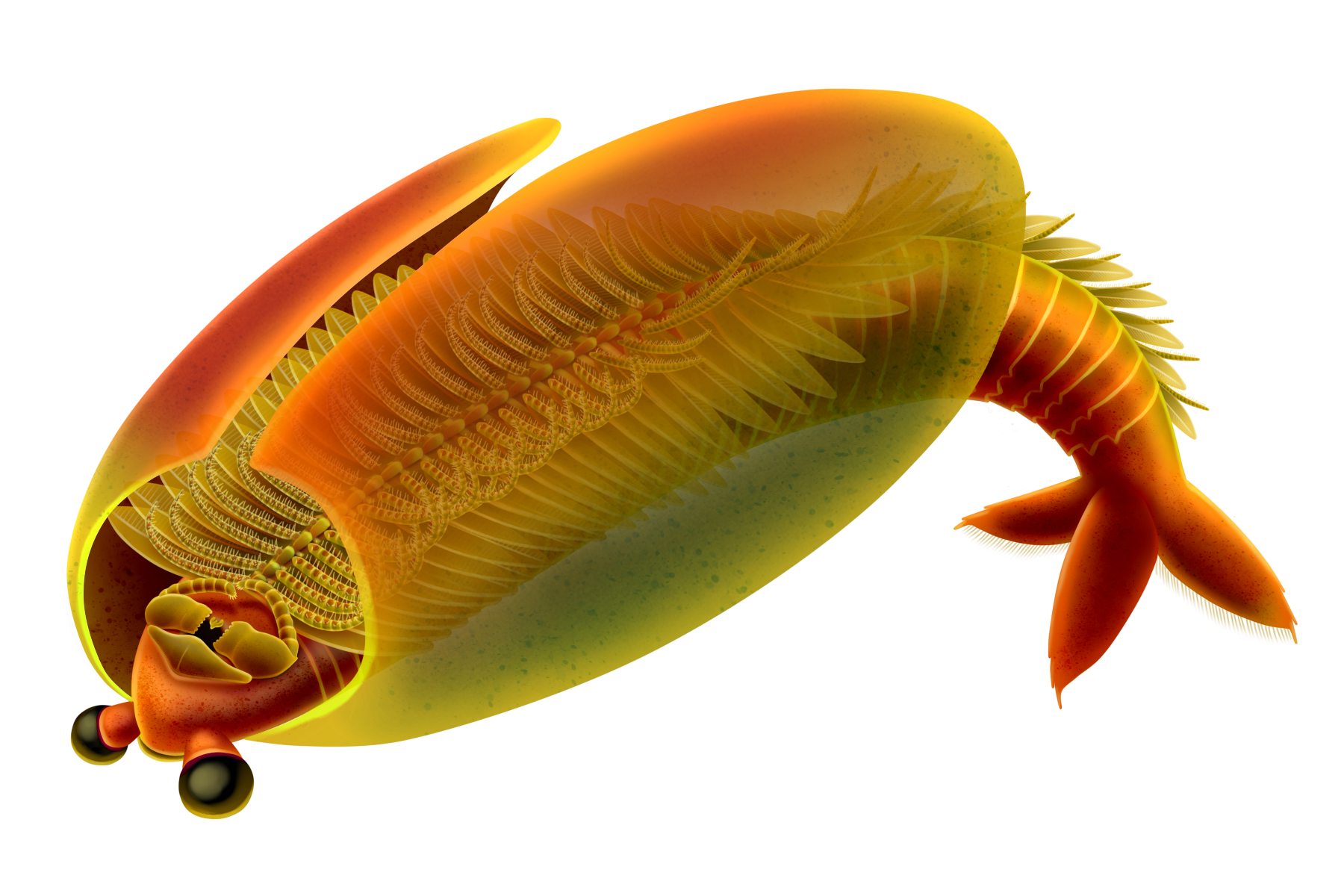
Life restoration of Odaraia, which had a trifurcate tail and probably habitually swam upside down

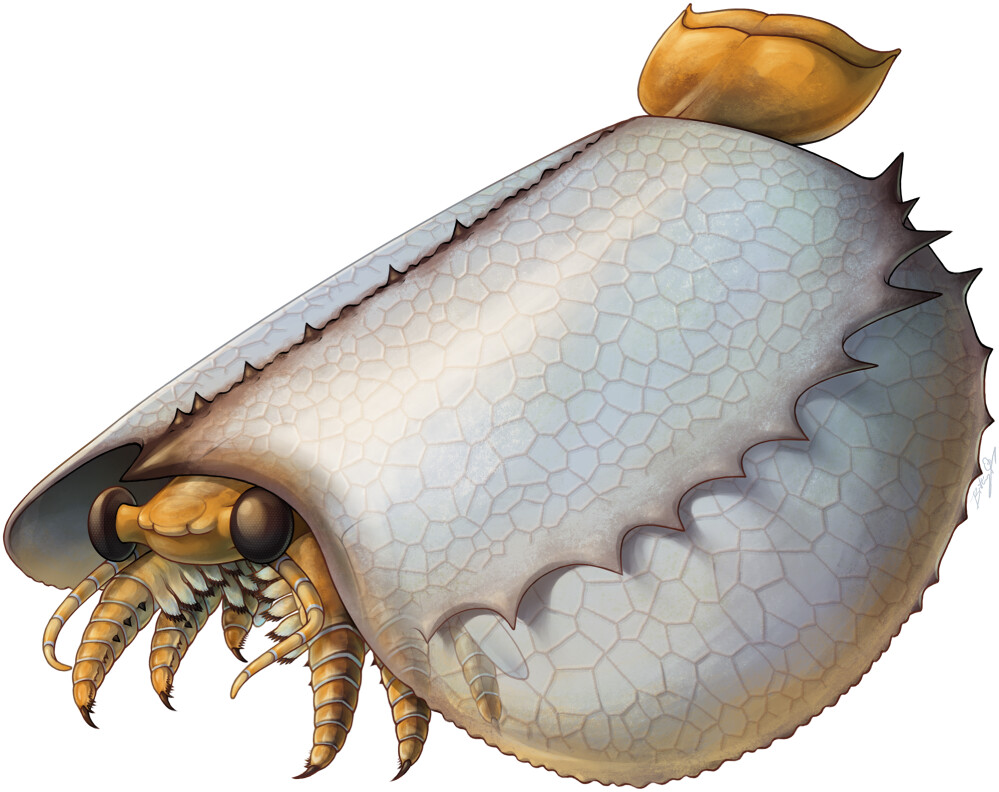
Life restoration of Tuzoia, a large hymenocarine

== Taxonomy ==
Based on the interpretation of simple head region that possess only a few segments and appendages, hymenocarine taxa were thought to be part of the upper stem-group euarthropods in early and mid 2010s. They later became widely accepted as mandibulates (the group that contains insects, crustaceans, centipedes and millipedes, among others) after the discovery of their mandible-bearing mouthparts in late 2010s. Since then, most phylogenetic analysis suggest hymenocarines represent part of the mandibulate stem-group, with some results suggest a rather crownward position such as stem-pancrustaceans, stem-myriapods, stem-hexapods or somewhere in-between the former taxa.

Several subgroups within the order are recognised, including Waptiidae and Protocarididae. The internal relationships of Hymenocarina are unstable, and it is unclear whether the group is monophyletic or paraphyletic.

=== List of families and genera ===
- Canadaspis
- Clypecaris
- ?Dioxycaris
- Ercaicunia
- ?Erjiecaris
- ?Forfexicaris
- ?Occacaris
- ?Ovalicephalus
- Perspicaris
- Plenocaris
- ?Pseudoarctolepis
- ?Yunnanocaris
- Xiazhuangocaris
- ?Cassicaris
- Pectocaris
- Odaraiidae
  - Balhuticaris
  - Odaraia
  - Jugatacaris
  - Nereocaris
  - Fibulacaris
  - Pakucaris
  - ?Vermontcaris
- Tuzoiidae
  - Tuzoia
  - Duplapex
- Protocarididae
  - Tokummia
  - Branchiocaris
  - Protocaris
  - Loricicaris
- Waptiidae
  - Waptia
  - Pauloterminus
  - Synophalos?
  - Chuandianella? (lacks mandibles, may not be a hymenocarine)

Cambrian bivalved arthropods are now recognised to be a polyphyletic group, with other groups of bivalved arthropods such as the Isoxyida, Bradoriida and Phosphatocopina only distantly related to Hymenocarina. Chuandianella a bivalved arthropod morphologically similar to Waptia and long thought to be closely related was reinterpreted as a non-hymenocarine euarthropod based on a restudy published in 2022, which found that it definitely lacked mandibles, characteristic of true hymenocarines.

Cladogram after Liu et al, 2026. showing possible placement of Hymenocarina within Mandibulata:

- Panarthropoda
  - † "Lobopodia" (paraphyletic, ancestral to tardigrades, onychophorans and arthropods)
  - Total group Euarthropoda
    - †Megadictyon
    - - - †Kerygmachela
        - - †Pambdelurion
          - - †Opabiniidae
            - - † Radiodonta (e.g Anomalocaris)
              - Deuteropoda
                - †Erratus
                - - †Sunella
                  - - †Isoxyidae + "Great appendage bivalved forms"
                    - - - †Fengzhengia
                        - †Kylinxia
                      - - †Megacheira
                        - Pan-Chelicerata
                      - - †Kiisortoqia
                        - †Bushizheia
                        - Antennulata
                          - †Artiopoda (including Trilobita)
                          - Mandibulata
                            - †Fuxianhuiida
                            - - †Hymenocarina
                              - - Myriapoda
                                - Pancrustacea

Cladogram of Hymenocarina, following Izquierdo-López and Caron, (2024):

- - Hymenocarina
    - - - Tuzoia
        - Perspicaris
      - - Pectocaris
        - Protocarididae
          - Loricicaris
          - - Tokummia
            - Branchiocaris
    - - - - Plenocaris
          - - Ercaicunia
            - Clypecaris
        - - Pauloterminus
          - - Canadaspis
            - - Waptia
              - Chuandianella
      - - Vermontcaris
        - Odaraiidae
          - Odaraia
          - - Jugatacaris
            - - - Fibulacaris
                - Pakucaris
              - - Balhuticaris
                - Nereocaris
