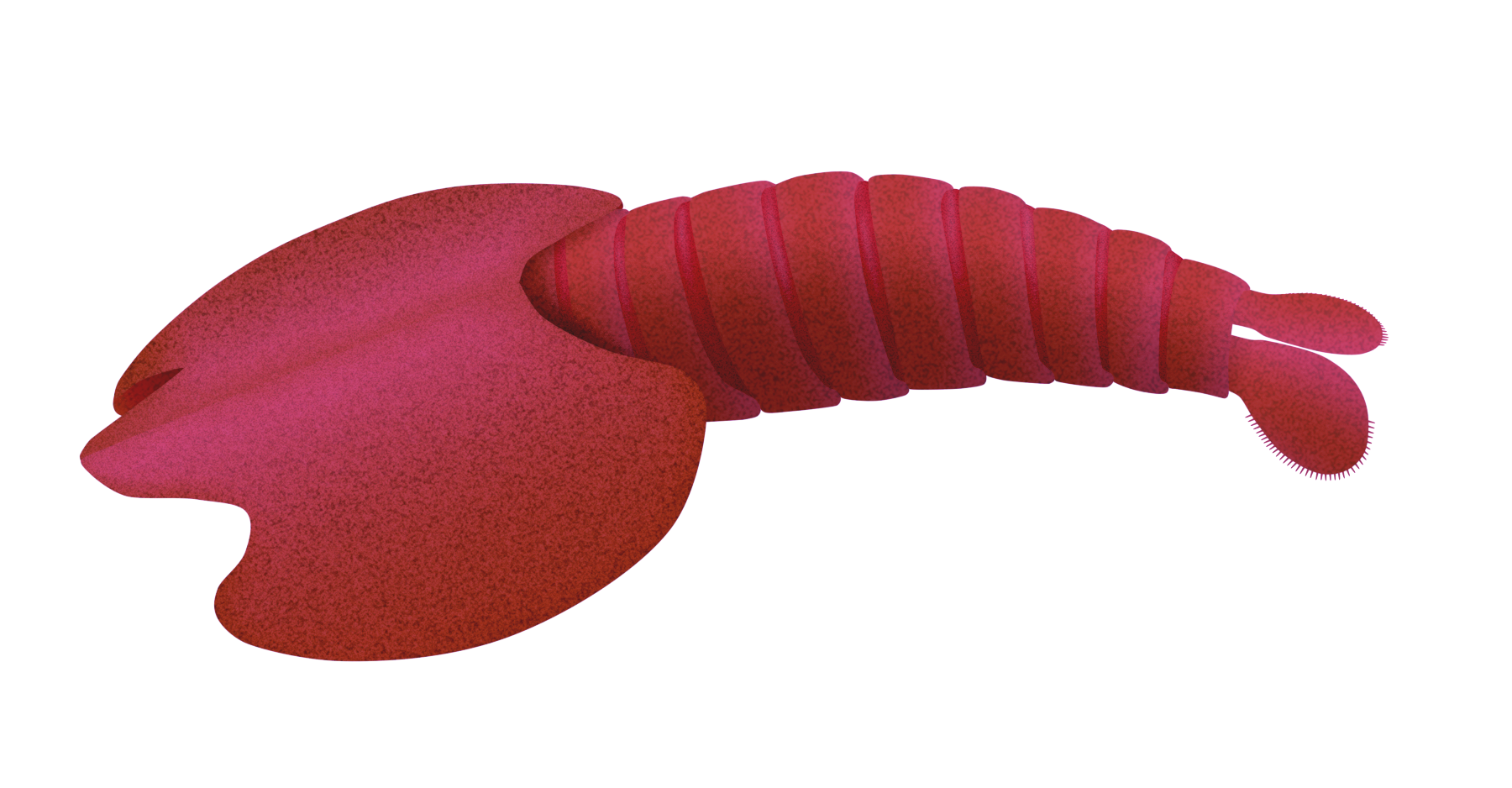
- Restoration

Scientific classification
- Kingdom: Animalia
- Phylum: Arthropoda
- Order: †Hymenocarina
- Genus: †Xiazhuangocaris; Zeng et al. 2020

Type species
- Xiazhuangocaris chenggongensis Zeng et al. 2020

= Xiazhuangocaris =

Xiazhuangocaris Temporal range: Cambrian Stage 3

Extinct genus of arthropods

Xiazhuangocaris is an extinct genus of bivalved arthropod known from the Cambrian aged Chengjiang Biota of Yunnan, China. Only a single specimen (NIGP 172765) is known, around 5.3 centimetres (2.1 in) long, which only preserves the anatomy of the carapace and the trunk. The bivalved carpace has a pronounced pair of notches at its front, as well as a posterior notch at its rear. The body had at least 13 tergite-pleurite rings, which terminate in a pair of rounded caudal rami, which are fringed with setae. The describing authors interpreted the taxon as a member of Hymenocarina, which contains other Cambrian bivalved arthropods.
