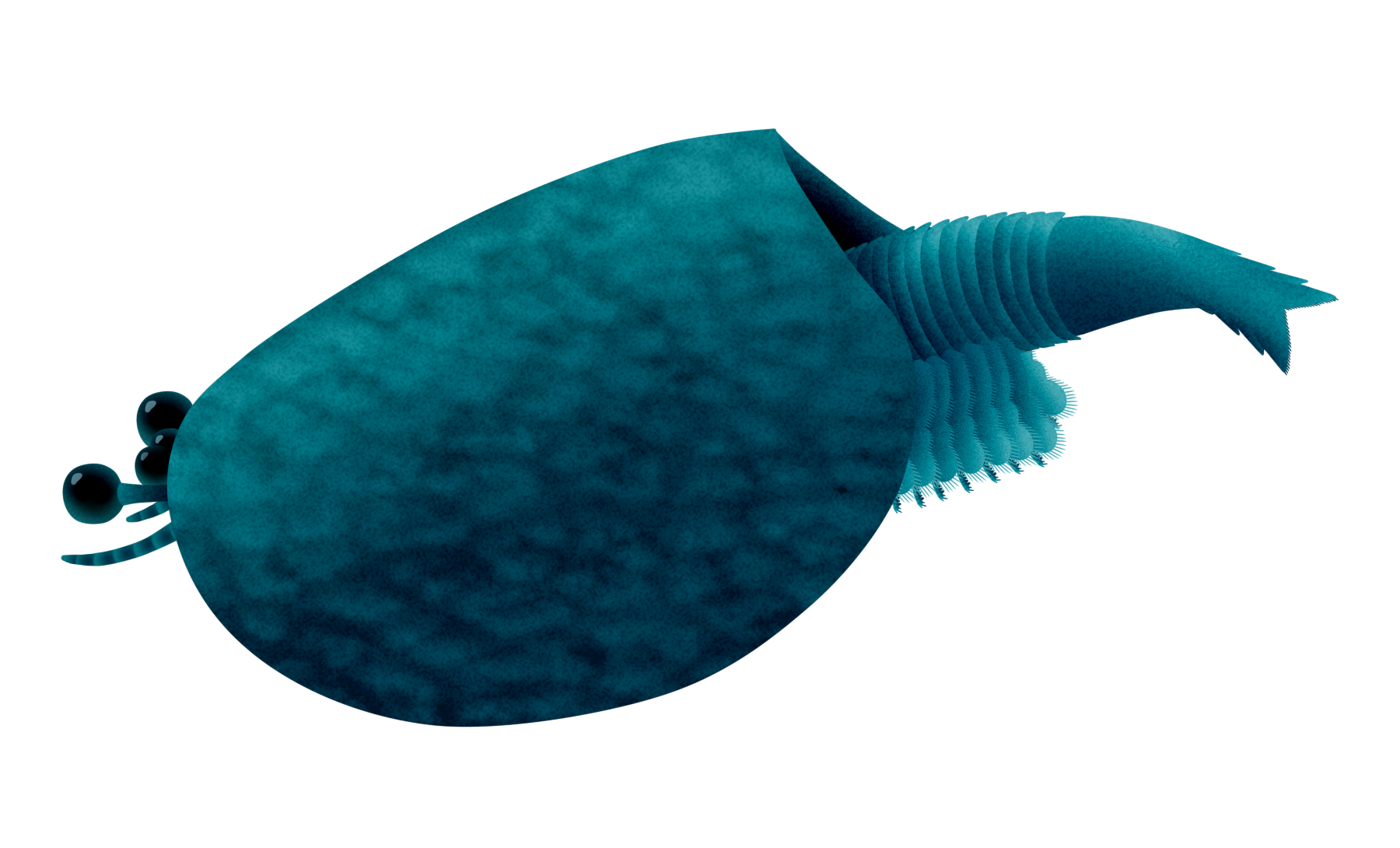
- Life restoration
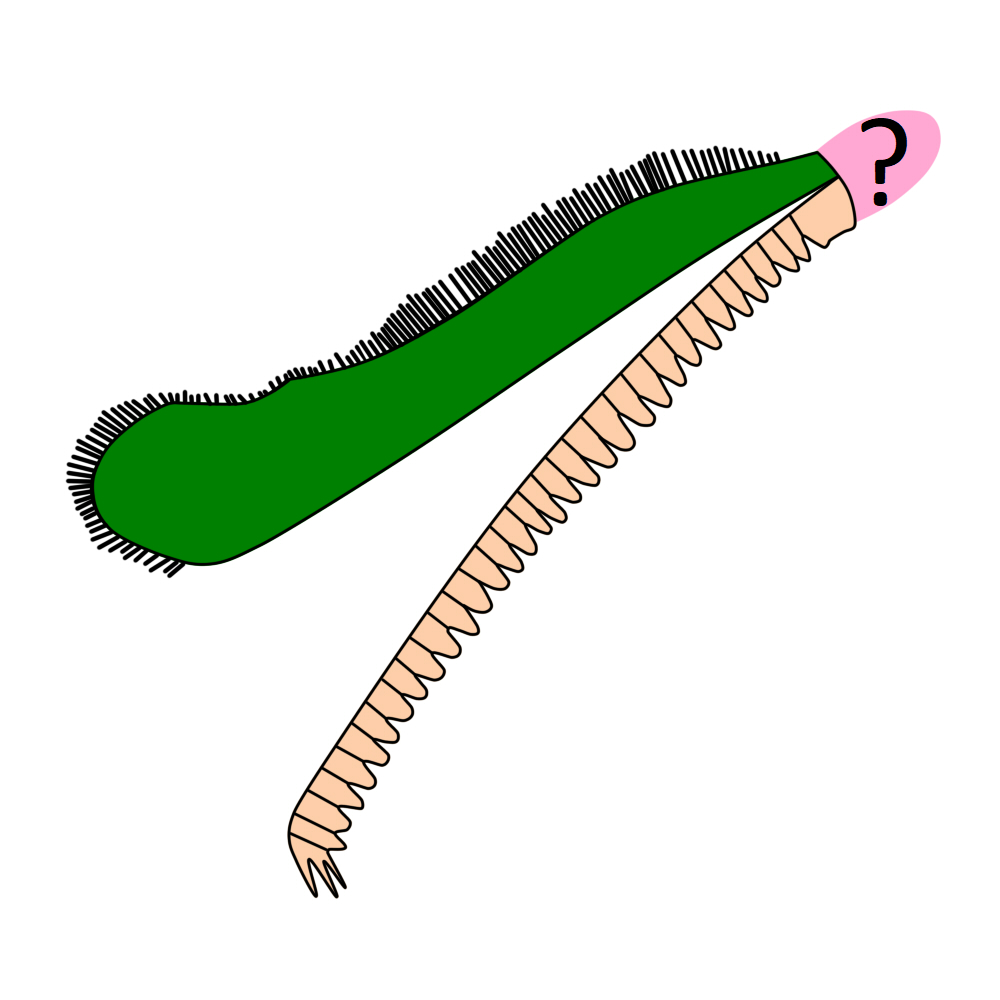
- Diagram of biramous appendage showing the endopod in tan, and the exopod in green

Scientific classification
- Kingdom: Animalia
- Phylum: Arthropoda
- Order: †Hymenocarina
- Genus: †Jugatacaris; Fu & Zhang, 2011
- Species: †J. agilis

Binomial name
- †Jugatacaris agilis Fu & Zhang, 2011

= Jugatacaris =

Jugatacaris Temporal range: Cambrian Stage 3

Extinct genus of bivalved arthropod

Jugatacaris is an extinct genus of bivalved arthropod known from a single species, Jugatacaris agilis found in the Cambrian Stage 3 aged Chengjiang biota of Yunnan, China. The carapace is around 28 to 37 millimetres (1.1 to 1.5 in) in length, with a pronounced ridge at the top of the carapace separating the two valves, which formed a fin-like structure raised above the carapace. The head has a pair of stalked eyes, as well as a dumbbell shaped medial eye between them. The head also bore a pair of mandibles as well as at least one and possibly two pairs of antennae. The trunk had up to 65 segments, each with biramous (two-branched) appendages. The appendages had thin endopods (lower-leg-like branches) with 30 podomeres (segments), each bearing a spiny endite (growth on the inner face of the limb), with the endopods ending with a terminal claw. The appendages also had overlapping flap-like exopods (upper limb branches) which are elongated, being at maximum eight times as long as they are wide, which on their posterior edge are covered with setae (hair or bristle-like structures). The trunk ended with a forked tail. It was likely an actively swimming filter feeder, using its constantly beating appendages to sift food from the water column, which was then passed forward along the U-shaped food groove between the appendage pairs towards the mouth. While initially placed as a crustaceanomorph, later studies considered to be a member of Hymenocarina, which contains numerous other similar bivalved Cambrian arthropods.
