= Chengjiang =

Chengjiang 澄江市
- County-level city
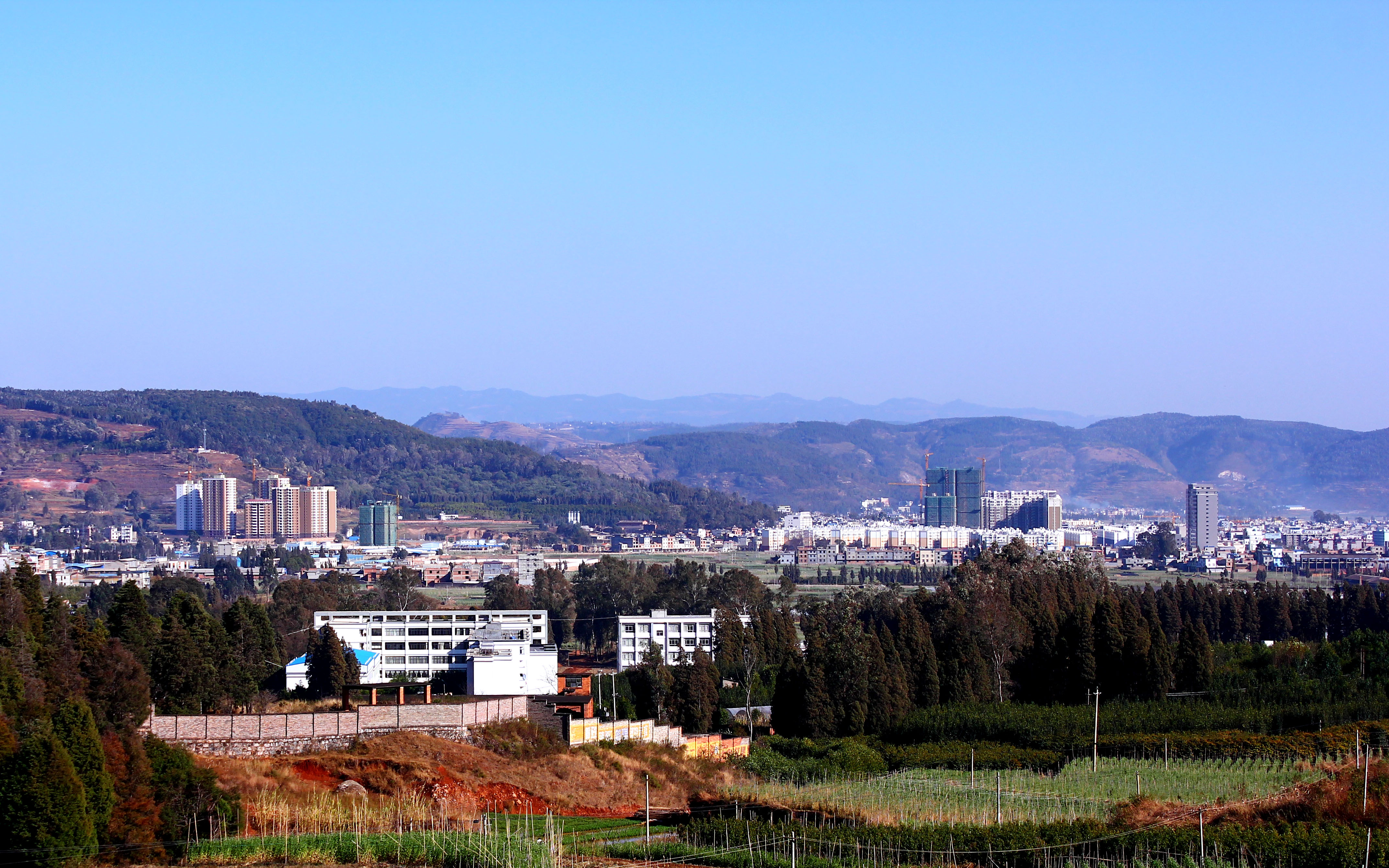

- Location of the county (red) in Yuxi (pink) and Yunnan

- Location of the county seat in Yunnan
- Coordinates: 24°39′02″N 102°56′06″E
- Country: People's Republic of China
- Province: Yunnan
- Prefecture-level city: Yuxi

Area
  - Total: 804 km^{2} (310 sq mi)

Population
  - Total: 146,293
  - Density: 182/km^{2} (471/sq mi)
- Time zone: UTC+8 (China Standard)
- Postal code: 652500
- Area code: 0877
- Website: www.yncj.gov.cn

UNESCO World Heritage Site
- Official name: Chengjiang Fossil Site
- Criteria: Natural: (viii)
- Reference: 1388
- Inscription: 2012 (36th Session)
- Area: 512 ha (1,270 acres)
- Buffer zone: 220 ha (540 acres)

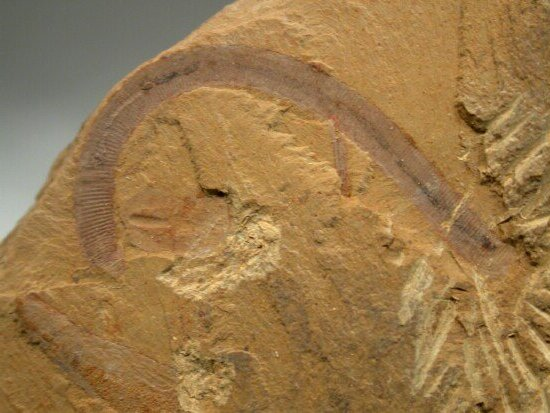
Chengjiang fossil

Chengjiang (simplified Chinese: 澄江; traditional Chinese: 澂江; pinyin: Chéngjiāng; earlier Tchinkiang) is a city located in Yuxi, Yunnan Province, China, just north of Fuxian Lake.

== Administrative divisions ==
Chengjiang City has 2 subdistricts and 4 townships.

2 subdistricts

- Fenglu (凤麓街道)
- Longjie (龙街街道)

4 towns

- Yousuo (右所镇)
- Yangzong (阳宗镇)
- Haikou (海口镇)
- Jiucun (九村镇)

== Chengjiang Fossil Site ==
In evolutionary biology, and especially paleontology, Chengjiang is noted for soft-tissue fossil finds, of the Maotianshan Shales, dated less than 518 million years ago during the Cambrian explosion, which "are as spectacular as the Burgess Shale fauna, and significantly older." These fossils are considered one of the most important fossil finds of the 20th century. They contain an exquisite degree of detail, cover a diverse range of fauna, and are significant in attempts to understand the evolution of life on Earth. In 2012, the Changjiang Fossil Site became a UNESCO World Heritage Site.

The fossils were first discovered by Henri Mansuy and Jacques Deprat who described them in 1912, the year after Charles Walcott's initial publications on the Burgess Shale. It was not until 1984 that the true significance of the palaeontology of the region was realised by Hou Xian-guang, a professor at Yunnan University, Kunming, where he is director of the Research Center for Chengjiang Biota. Previously he was a professor at the Palaeontological Institute, Chinese Academy of Sciences, Nanjing.

Chengjiang is an underdeveloped city having rich phosphate deposits above and below the formation holding the lagerstätte. They have been exploited in part through efforts that began at about the same time that Hou Xian-guang discovered the deposits that bear these exceptional fossils, with phosphate mining bringing in some 2/3 of the city's revenue in 2003. Efforts were made to close the region to mining in a bid to support the city's bid for listing as a World Heritage Site, given the scientific significance of the fossils. A consequence of this was renewed mining efforts in the region, which threatened the fossil-bearing strata due to erosion, slumping of overburden, and simple destruction by the mining efforts.

Chengjiang faces a dilemma between calls for preservation of the treasure trove of early Cambrian fossils, the economic reliance it has on the phosphate industry, and the difficulty of finding a balance between exploitation and restoration of the land while this is still possible.

== Climate ==
Climate data for Chengjiang, elevation 1,796 m (5,892 ft), (1991–2020 normals, extremes 1981–present)
Month	Jan	Feb	Mar	Apr	May	Jun	Jul	Aug	Sep	Oct	Nov	Dec	Year
Record high °C (°F)	24.1 (75.4)	27.2 (81.0)	29.1 (84.4)	31.5 (88.7)	32.9 (91.2)	30.7 (87.3)	31.4 (88.5)	29.7 (85.5)	30.7 (87.3)	27.7 (81.9)	27.0 (80.6)	24.0 (75.2)	32.9 (91.2)
Mean daily maximum °C (°F)	16.9 (62.4)	19.0 (66.2)	22.5 (72.5)	25.1 (77.2)	25.7 (78.3)	25.6 (78.1)	25.4 (77.7)	25.6 (78.1)	24.1 (75.4)	21.6 (70.9)	19.2 (66.6)	16.5 (61.7)	22.3 (72.1)
Daily mean °C (°F)	10.0 (50.0)	12.0 (53.6)	15.3 (59.5)	18.3 (64.9)	20.1 (68.2)	21.1 (70.0)	21.0 (69.8)	20.7 (69.3)	19.3 (66.7)	16.8 (62.2)	13.3 (55.9)	10.2 (50.4)	16.5 (61.7)
Mean daily minimum °C (°F)	5.4 (41.7)	6.8 (44.2)	9.9 (49.8)	12.9 (55.2)	15.8 (60.4)	17.9 (64.2)	18.0 (64.4)	17.6 (63.7)	16.3 (61.3)	13.8 (56.8)	9.4 (48.9)	6.2 (43.2)	12.5 (54.5)
Record low °C (°F)	−2.0 (28.4)	−0.1 (31.8)	−4.0 (24.8)	3.2 (37.8)	6.7 (44.1)	10.9 (51.6)	12.7 (54.9)	11.7 (53.1)	7.4 (45.3)	5.4 (41.7)	−1.9 (28.6)	−4.4 (24.1)	−4.4 (24.1)
Average precipitation mm (inches)	23.1 (0.91)	10.9 (0.43)	19.1 (0.75)	25.8 (1.02)	78.2 (3.08)	160.3 (6.31)	202.1 (7.96)	162.4 (6.39)	114.5 (4.51)	79.4 (3.13)	32.6 (1.28)	16.3 (0.64)	924.7 (36.41)
Average precipitation days (≥ 0.1 mm)	4.7	3.8	5.2	6.8	11.4	15.7	19.6	18.5	14.0	12.5	5.1	4.0	121.3
Average snowy days	0.9	0.5	0.2	0	0	0	0	0	0	0	0.1	0.4	2.1
Average relative humidity (%)	68	61	56	57	66	77	80	79	77	78	74	73	71
Mean monthly sunshine hours	205.5	205.9	236.4	237.8	206.3	133.4	120.2	138.4	123.0	127.9	177.9	182.2	2,094.9
Percentage possible sunshine	61	64	63	62	50	33	29	35	34	36	55	56	48
Source: China Meteorological Administrationall-time November record high
