= Hou Xian-guang =

Chinese paleontologist

- Born: 26 March 1949 (age 77); Fenxiang, Jiangsu Province, China
- Education: Nanjing University (MSc); University of Uppsala (PhD)
- Known for: Chengjiang biota
- Spouse: Qing Liu
- Children: Min Hou
- Awards: Grand prize of Natural Sciences (1997); First-class Award of Natural Sciences (2003)
- Scientific career
- Fields: Palaeontology
- Workplaces: Nanjing University; Nanjing Institute of Geology and Paleontology; Yunnan University
- Thesis: Bradoriid arthropods from the Lower Cambrian of South-west China (1997)
- Author abbrev. (zoology): Hou

Hou Xian-guang (alternatively Xianguang; Chinese: 侯先光; born 26 March 1949) is a Chinese paleontologist at Yunnan University who made key discoveries in the Cambrian life of China around 518 myr. His first discovery of animal fossils from the Cambrian sediments (now called Maotianshan Shales) at Chengjiang County, Yunnan Province, led to the establishment of the Chengjiang biota, an assemblage of various life forms during the Cambrian Period. The discovery of the Chengjiang biota, remarked as "among the most spectacular in this [20th] century", added to the better understanding of how animal forms (different phyla) originated and evolved during the so-called Cambrian explosion.

Among the recognitions Hou received are the Grand Prize of Natural Sciences (1997) from the Chinese Academy of Sciences and the First-class Award of Natural Sciences (2003), one of the highest State Science and Technology Prizes of the People's Republic of China. The Yunnan University claims that it "gained a worldwide reputation through the discovery and research [by Hou]."

== Biography ==
Hou was born in Fenxiang, Jiangsu Province, China to a school teacher Kun Hou and his wife Rui Fen. He completed his entire schooling at the First Middle School of Xuzhou City. He studied BSc in geology at the Nanjing University from 1973 and completed it in 1977. Between 1977 and 1998 he worked as a lecturer of geology at Nanjing. Then he continued his MSc in paleontology and earned his master's degree in 1981. Immediately after graduation he joined the faculty of Nanjing University as a geology teacher. He enrolled at the University of Uppsala, Sweden, in 1992 for a doctoral degree and obtained a Ph.D. in 1997. His thesis was Bradoriid arthropods from the Lower Cambrian of South-west China (later highlighted as A Monograph of the Bradoriid Arthropods from the Lower Cambrian of SW China).

While Hou pursued his research in Sweden, he got promoted as associate professor in 1922 and then a professor in 1994. He was appointed by the Chinese Academy of Sciences to become a geologist at the Nanjing Institute of Geology and Paleontology in 1997. He transferred to the Yunnan University, in Kunming, to take up the position of a professor of paleobiology and leads (as director) the Yunnan Key Laboratory for Paleobiology since 2000.

=== Personal life ===
Hou is married to a school teacher Qing Liu with whom he has a daughter Min. He lives in Kunming, Yunnan.

== Books authored ==
- The Chengjiang Fauna: Exceptionally Well-preserved Fauna from 530 Million Years Ago (1999)
- A Monograph of the Bradoriid Arthropods from the Lower Cambrian of SW China (2002)
- The Cambrian Fossils of Chengjiang, China: The Flowering of Early Animal Life (first edition 2004, second 2017)

== Awards and honours ==
Hou received the Grand Prize of Natural Sciences from the Chinese Academy of Sciences in 1997; the First-class Award of Natural Sciences, one of the highest State Science and Technology Prizes, from the Chinese State Council in 2003; the Paleontological Science Prize of China in 2004. The Ho Leung Ho Lee Foundation of Hong Kong awarded him its Paleontology and Archeology Prize in 2006, and its Science and Technology Innovation Award with recognition as among the "Leading Scientific and Technological Talents of Yunnan" in 2017.
