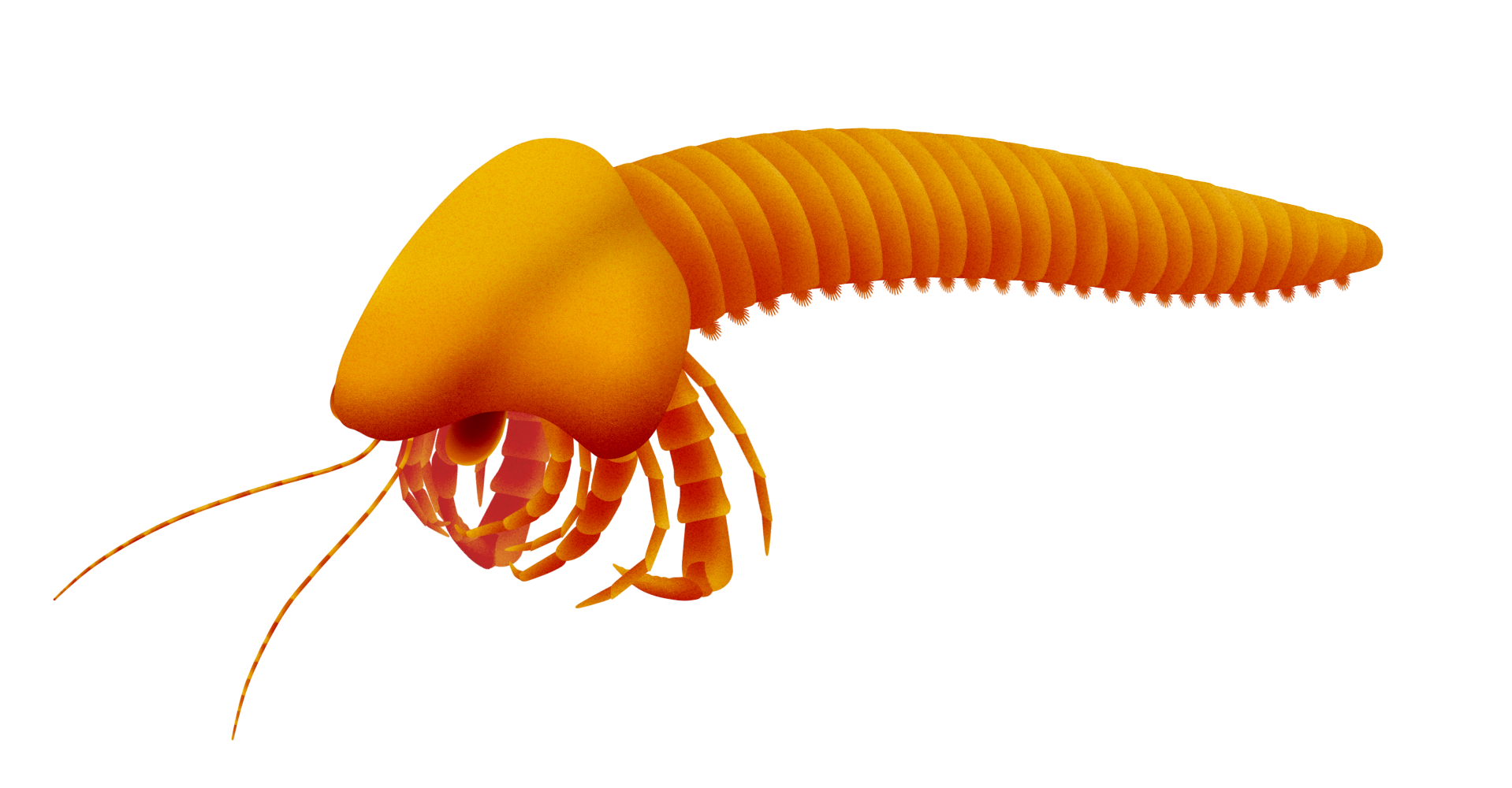
- Reconstruction of A. stimulapis (based on Morph B specimens)
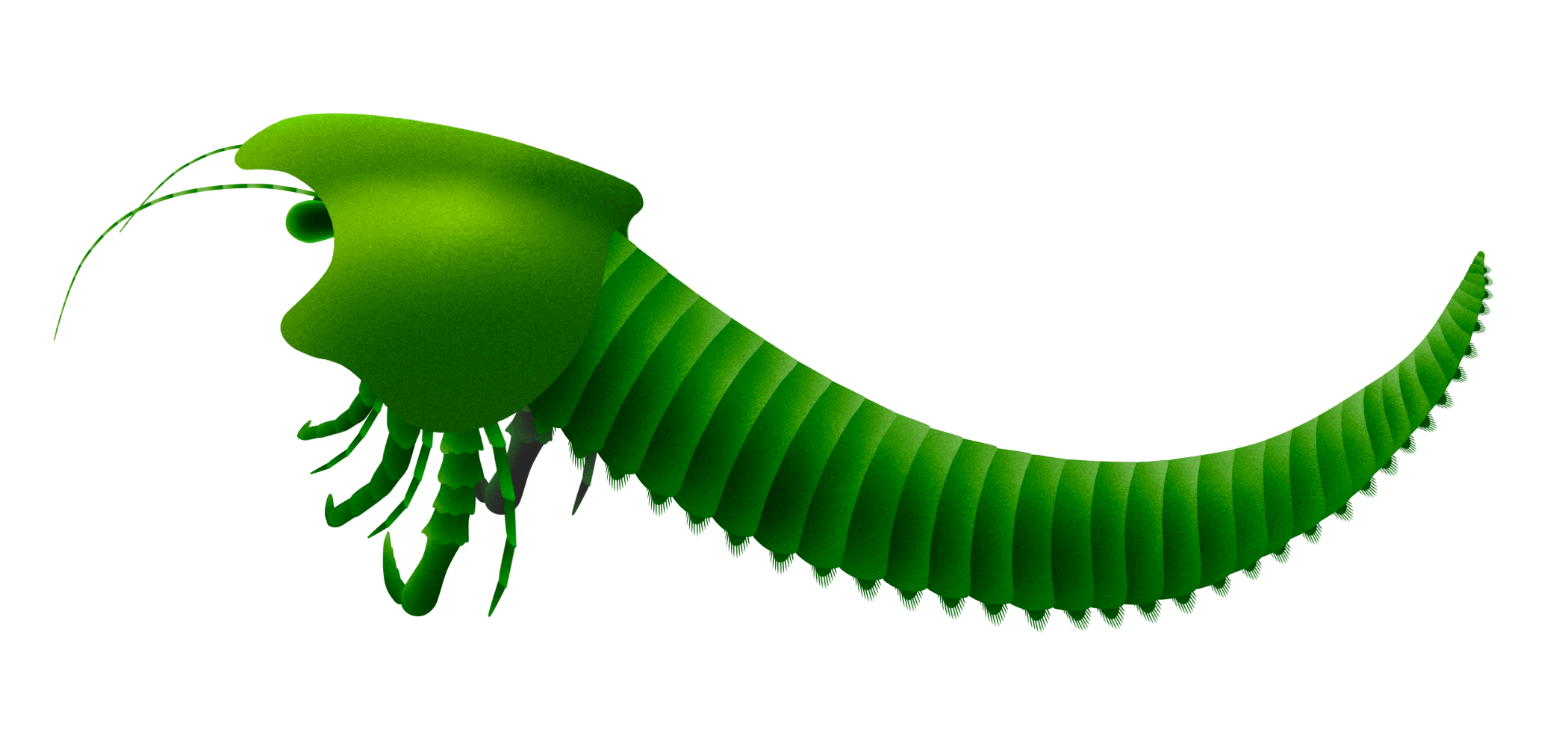
- Reconstruction of Morph A

Scientific classification
- Kingdom: Animalia
- Phylum: Arthropoda
- Genus: †Acheronauta; Pulsipher et al., 2022
- Species: †A. stimulapis

Binomial name
- †Acheronauta stimulapis Pulsipher et al., 2022

= Acheronauta =

Acheronauta Temporal range: Silurian, Llandoverian (Telychian), 437.4–436.2 Ma

Possible extinct mandibulate arthropod

Acheronauta is a genus of extinct worm-shaped arthropod that lived in the early Silurian (Telychian-Sheinwoodian stages) Waukesha biota fossil site in southeast Wisconsin. This arthropod was first discovered alongside the biota in 1985, but was not fully described until October 2022. This creature was recognized and described as a possible early mandibulate (the grouping of arthropods including crustaceans and hexapods). This description is very important as much of the fauna of the biota remain undescribed, and its discovery has allowed for paleontologists to get a better grasp of the diversity of the arthropod fauna at the site. Multiple phylogenetic analyses were performed, and it was found that this arthropod forms a previously undiscovered clade with the Devonian stem-arthropod Captopodus, and the somewhat enigmatic group Thylacocephala.

Acheronauta has been assessed as a possible basal mandibulate, which are distinguished from other arthropods due to the presence of mandibles. While its specific placement in the mandibulate family tree has not been fully known, it is accepted to occupy a position near the base of the grouping.

== Discovery and naming ==
Before it was named, Acheronauta was recognized as one of the most abundant arthropod fossils from the biota (only behind the dalmantid trilobite Waukeshaaspis, and several leperditicopid ostracods). Leading up to its description, this arthropod was not well studied, and remained an enigmatic genus. About twenty-three fossils are known of this arthropod that were found in the 1980s and 1990s due to the initial quarrying activity that revealed the lagerstätte. Currently these fossils are housed in the UWGM, along with many of the other fossils from the site. The fossils of this creature were originally assumed to be thylacocephalans without a whole-body carapace.

Acheronauta derives from the Latin word Acheronta, which is the Latin version of the Greek word Acheron, which itself is another name for the River of Woe, a river of the Greek underworld. The last part of the genus name Nauta means "sailor". Acheronauta thus is translated as 'sailor on the River of Woe'. This name is a reference to the harsh environments of Silurian Waukesha that allowed for this site to be preserved. The species name Stimulapis derives from the Latin words Stimulas which means sting, and apis which means bee. The specific epithet translates to 'sting like a bee', which according to the authors of the paper is in honor of the American boxer Muhammad Ali.

Many of the specimens of A. stimulapis do not preserve the full anatomy of the arthropod, however the large number of specimens helped paleontologists reconstruct it.

== Description ==
The twenty-three or so specimens of this arthropod show it had two tagmata, a head covering carapace that bore a number of head appendages, and an elongated multisegmented trunk region that was composed of around forty-four pairs of segments that bore small swimming appendages. The carapace of the organism was small, only shielding the head and the first segments of the main body. This feature looks like the bivalved carapaces of other arthropods like the hymenocarines, but due to the lack of dorsally oriented fossils means that there is no confirmation of the presence of a hinge line. On the anterior area of the head was an ocular somite that bore a pair of teardrop-shaped eyes that possessed facets. The presence of a mandible in this creature seems to provide more evidence for a mandibulate affinity. The mandibles found display rows of simple teeth that sat on what looks like a grinding surface. Behind the somite were five head appendages with the first set being arthrodized antennae, mandibles, and the others being posterior biramous appendages that appear to end in a single claw. The first three segments of the trunk region are smaller than the others. Each trunk segment bore a pair of small, paddle-shaped swimming appendages. Organ materials are not observed from this species, except in some cases of there being poorly preserved gut tracts. There is also some evidence for muscle fibers being present within the head of some of the fossils. While there is not enough evidence to make the argument of there being two species, there are differences in some of the fossils of this arthropod that the authors have labeled as "Morph A" and "Morph B". The main distinction between these two morphs is the shape of the trunk terminus. The trunk of "Morph A" fossils is shorter than that of "Morph B" fossils, showing fewer than thirty appendages. The second distinction is the shape of the carapace. "Morph A" fossils show a blunt anterior margin, with the eyes extending beyond said margin. "Morph B" fossils on the other hand show a pronounced anterodorsal keel coming off of this margin, with the carapace being slightly deeper, and the eyes being slightly more posterior in location.

== Classification ==
Cladogram after Pulsipher et al. 2022:

- Total group Mandibulata
  - †Parioscorpio venator
  - - †Cascolus ravitis
    - - †Tanazios dokeron
      - - - †Captopodus poschmanni
          - - †Acheronauta stimulapis
            - †Thylacocephala
        - - †Occacaris oviformis
          - - - Myriapoda
              - - †Ercaicunia multinodosa
                - - - †Clypecaris pteroidea
                    - - - - †Waptia fieldensis
                          - †Perspicaris dictynna
                        - - †Canadaspis perfecta
                          - - †Tokummia katalepsis
                            - †Branchiocaris pretiosa
                      - - - †Nereocaris exilis
                          - †Odaraia alata
                        - - †Euthycarcinoidea
                          - †Fuxianhuiida
            - Pancrustacea (including Hexapoda)

Three versions of a Bayesian phylogenetic analysis were cunducted because of the ambiguity of some of the features of A. stimulapis. Coded within these analyses were more than a hundred taxa of arthropods, including Captopodus poschmanni, and the thylacocephalans. Interestingly, the authors of the paper also coded in Parioscorpio venator, an enigmatic arthropod that coexisted with A. stimulapis. The studies originally provided evidence for this genus being related to either the thylacocephalans or the remipedes (a grouping of vermiform crustaceans found in underground bodies of water), however remipedes don't have a carapace and only possess one tagma. The other analyses show definite evidence of it being related to, and forming a clade with C. poschmanni and the thylacocephalans. The study placed these three taxa as close to the base of the mandibulate family tree, being more basal than the hymenocarines. The primary interpretation showed this genus as a sister group to the thylacocephalans and C. poschmanni. This study found that instead of being members of crustacea or eucrustcea, the thylacocephalans were found to be placed outside of the crown-group crustaceans and myirapods as stem-group mandibulates. Additionally, Parioscorpio, which has remained enigmatic for over four years since its description in 2020, was found to occupy a position between the Artiopoda and mandibulates, making it slightly related to A. stimulapis, and a basal taxon to the total-group mandibulata. This is actually consistent with the recent rejection of this genus being a cheloniellid within the artiopoda. A 2025 study strongly questioned the relationship with Thylacocephala, finding that while Acheronauta was an early diverging mandibulate relative as found by the original study, Thylacocephala was deeply nested within modern crustaceans:

- Mandibulata
  - †Aquilonifer
  - - †Tanazios
    - - - †Acheronauta
        - †Captopodus
      - - - †Nereocaris
          - - †Fuxianhuiida
            - †Hymenocarina
        - - - †Euthycarcinida
            - Myriapoda (including centipedes and millipedes)
          - Pancrustacea
            - Allotriocarida
              - Branchiopoda (tadpole shrimp/Triops, fairy shrimp, clam shrimp, water fleas)
              - - Hexapoda (including springtails and insects)
                - Xenocarida
                  - Cephalocarida (horseshoe shrimp)
                  - Remipedia
            - - Oligostraca
                - Branchiura (fish lice)
                - - Ostracoda
                  - Mystacocaridida
              - Multicrustacea
                - Copepoda
                - - Cirripedia (barnacles)
                  - - †Cyclida (Americlidae)
                    - - †Thylacocephala
                      - - Malacostraca (shrimp, prawn, lobsters, mantis shrimp, crab, woodlice, etc)

== Autecology and paleoecology ==
Based on certain characteristics of this creature (including the specialization of its appendages, and its large size compared to many of the other taxa from the lagerstätte), this arthropod was found to be a scavenger as well as an opportunistic predator. The exopods and endopods on the appendages of this arthropod may have functioned like a masticatory basket similar to that of most modern crustaceans. On the other hand, the large size of the appendages and their lack of setae would have probably limited the arthropod to the niche of ensnaring small prey, and not suspension feeding.

This arthropod lived alongside many other unique taxa that made up the fauna of the biota. Living in benthic parts of intertidal areas were arthropods like Parioscorpio, and the synziphosurine arthropod Venustulus waukeshaensis. Also living in these areas were a wide variety of worms like annelids, palaeoscolecids, and polychaetes. Possibly hunting in the midwater was Thylacares brandonensis, a thylacocephalan arthropod, and in terms of geographical location, the closest relative to A. stimulapis. Living in the area were a number of bivalved arthropods like phyllocarid and ostracod crustaceans. Also found in the area was Papiliomaris, known as "Butterfly animal", arthropod with uncertain taxonomic affiliates. Hard shelled organisms like nautiloid cephalopods, brachiopods, clams, corals, crinoids, and sponges are rare in these sediments, and the ones that are found are not well preserved. This is strange because these organisms are normally common in Silurian aged sediments. The reason for this is due to the unique preservation bias this site has, where the preservation of lightly skeletonized or soft bodied fossils was more favored than in other conditions. Aside from trilobites the only other group of hard shelled organisms that were common in these sediments were the conulariids, an enigmatic group of shelled invertebrates that were most likely cnidarians closely related to stalked jellyfish. Predatory chordates, like Panderodus are also known from these deposits. Other chordates, including potential conodonts have also been found.
