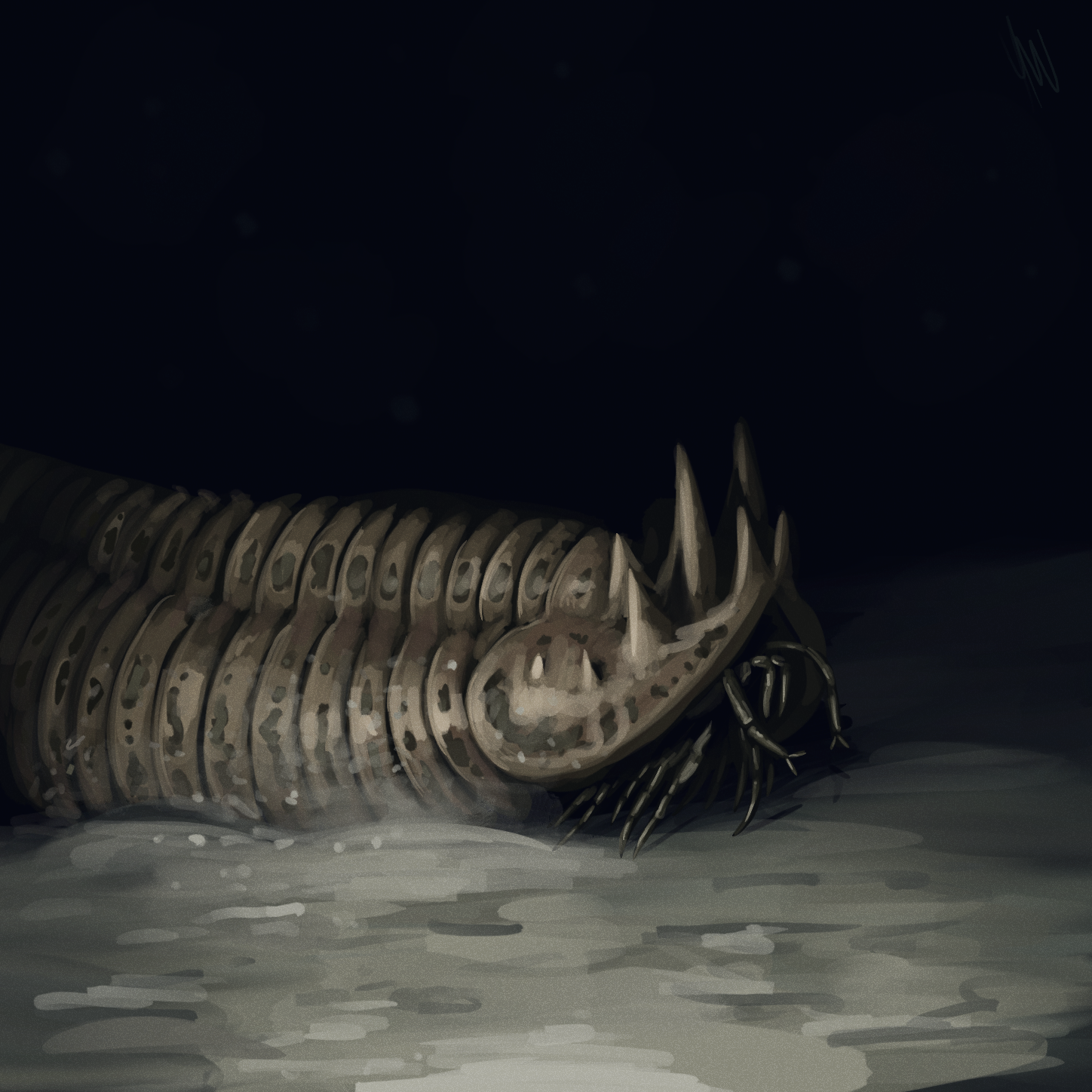
- Life reconstruction of Tanazios dokeron

Scientific classification
- Kingdom: Animalia
- Phylum: Arthropoda
- Genus: †Tanazios; Siveter et al, 2007
- Species: †T. dokeron

Binomial name
- †Tanazios dokeron Siveter et al, 2007

= Tanazios =

Tanazios Temporal range: Homerian

Extinct genus of arthropods

Tanazios is a genus of Silurian stem-mandibulate from the Coalbrookdale Formation of England.

== Description ==
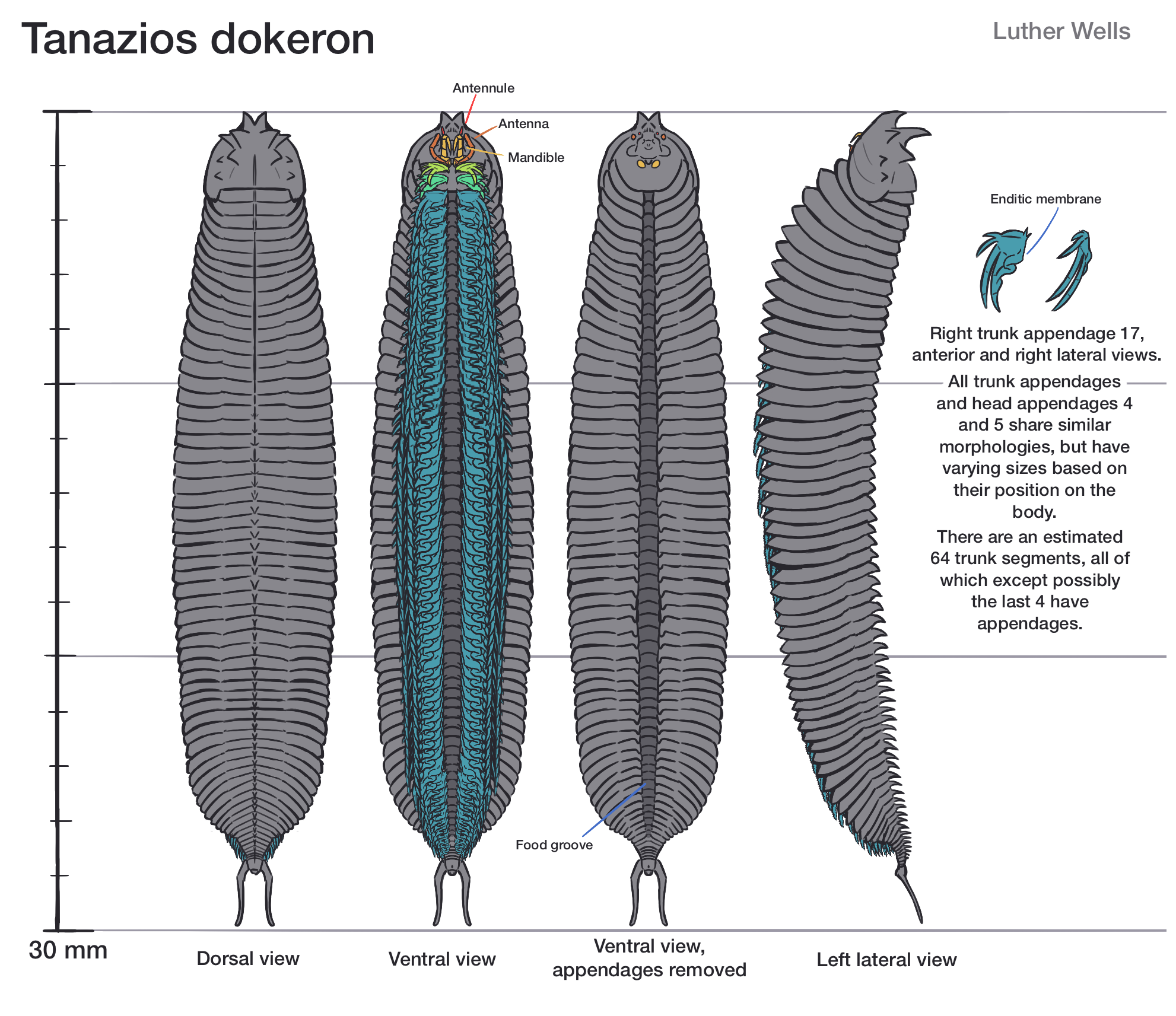
Diagrammatic reconstruction of Tanazios dokeron

Tanazios has a head shield that is semicircular in shape, divided into a fringe and an axial (central) region. The fringe margins meet somewhat abruptly at the front of the shield, with a long projection pointing from their back corners and six pairs of horn-like structures at the sides. The axial region is semi-ovoid in shape, around 3 times wider than long, and bears a wide furrow running down its length. At the sides there is a narrow ledge which pinches out towards the back and continues as the inner trunk pleurae. No eyes seem to be present. The hypostome is subrectangular and extends from the antennulae to the mandibular gnathobases, with an anterior margin bearing four small spines and a convex posterior margin with a lip-like structure which may be the labrum.

The antennulae are very short and uniramous, with the antennae being around five times longer and more ovoid in cross-section. The antennae are divided into three sections based on angle changes in the podomeres (segments). While there seems to be a pair of setae-like structures near the tip of the antennae on the holotype specimen, this feature is absent in others and may be a preservational artefact. The mandible is also uniramous, with its large coxa bearing a sharply raised gnathobase with an incisor-like protrusion. The basipod is subrectangular (rectangular with rounded corners), and narrows distally (away from the body axis). The endopod is rather small and like the antennae is split into three sections. The first two are fairly short, with the third being as long as both combined and tapering into a finger-like extension.

The fourth and fifth appendages are somewhat similar to both each other and the trunk appendages, both being biramous. The limb base is subrectangular with large subtriangular areas on the dorsal side (likely muscle insertion sites) alongside a flange-like endite projecting backwards. The limb base also bears an epipodite on its dorsal surface, likely alongside one more ventrally. The endopod is long and ribbon-like at its base, but becomes more finger-like towards its tip. It too is composed of three sections, with the first two only comprising one segment and the other being much longer. The exopod is similar (though shorter) and more ribbon-like. The endopod also has an unusual membrane running from its middle down to the limb base.

The trunk is composed of at least sixty-four segments alongside a small terminal piece, with a telson and caudal furcae at the terminal end. The anterior ten become smaller anteriorly and the posterior twenty become smaller posteriorly, with the last few being tiny. Each segment bears a pair of biramous appendages except possibly the last four (although they are too poorly preserved to tell), with a narrow groove running down the trunk's center. The axial region is around 80% the trunk's width, with the head groove continuing onto the first three segments, with a median spine on segments 22 to 62 (the last two instead have small median nodes). The pleural region has a very small ledge, with descending facets on all except the first segment. The pleurae are somewhat rounded at their corners with slight overlap posteriorly. The last three or four trunk segments either lack pleurae or have them, but are too small to be preserved.

Behind the terminal axial piece a small telson is preserved, extending into two triangular flaps (one dorsal, one ventral) with two caudal furcae, ovoid in cross-section, extending from the back parts of this telson. While these are incomplete, the preserved length is around 8% of the body length. Near the back of the telson a small opening flanked by two conical structures is preserved; this is likely the anus.

== Affinity ==
Tanazios somewhat resembles both the enigmatic arthropod Wingertshellicus and modern remipedes in morphology, however the limb arrangement of the head places it as a basal pancrustacean. More specifically, it either falls as a basal member of the clade containing both Pancrustacea and Phosphatocopina (Labrophora) or as an even more basal member allied with various Orsten arthropods, although likely the closest to the crown-group of these due to having a uniramous mandible.

== Palaeoecology ==
The Coalbrookdale Formation where Tanazios was found was deposited in waters over 200m deep, with the lack of light at these depths likely explaining the lack of eyes on the fossil as it being a benthic animal. Its many trunk appendages probably helped it swim, with the caudal furcae as stabilisers, with epipodites acting as respiratory organs and/or helping move water to other respiratory organs. Alongside this, the groove in the middle of the belly likely helped transfer food up to the mouth, with the enditic membranes possibly helping contain this food. The pleural facets and articulating half-rings suggest it was likely able to flex its trunk up and down, with the spines probably being defensive in nature. Despite having large gnathobases on its mandibles, its blindness and lack of elongated sensory organs suggests it was likely a scavenger.

== Etymology ==
Tanazios is a combination of the words "tanaos", meaning "long", "zoon", meaning "animal" and "pelagios", meaning "of the sea". The species name dokeron is a combination of "dodeka" ("twelve"), "kerouchos" ("horned") and "epikranon" ("helmet").

== Classification ==
Tanazios was originally considered as stem-group crustacean. According to phylogenic analysis in Pulsipher et al. (2022), it is considered as stem-mandibulate instead.

- Total group Mandibulata
  - †Parioscorpio venator
  - - †Cascolus ravitis
    - - †Tanazios dokeron
      - - - †Captopodus poschmanni
          - - †Acheronauta stimulapis
            - †Thylacocephala
        - - †Occacaris oviformis
          - - - Myriapoda
              - - †Ercaicunia multinodosa
                - - - †Clypecaris pteroidea
                    - - - - †Waptia fieldensis
                          - †Perspicaris dictynna
                        - - †Canadaspis perfecta
                          - - †Tokummia katalepsis
                            - †Branchiocaris pretiosa
                      - - - †Nereocaris exilis
                          - †Odaraia alata
                        - - †Euthycarcinoidea
                          - †Fuxianhuiida
            - Pancrustacea (including Hexapoda)

Cladogram after Laville et al. 2025:

- Mandibulata
  - †Aquilonifer
  - - †Tanazios
    - - - †Acheronauta
        - †Captopodus
      - - - †Nereocaris
          - - †Fuxianhuiida
            - †Hymenocarina
        - - - †Euthycarcinida
            - Myriapoda (including centipedes and millipedes)
          - Pancrustacea (including Thylacocephala)
