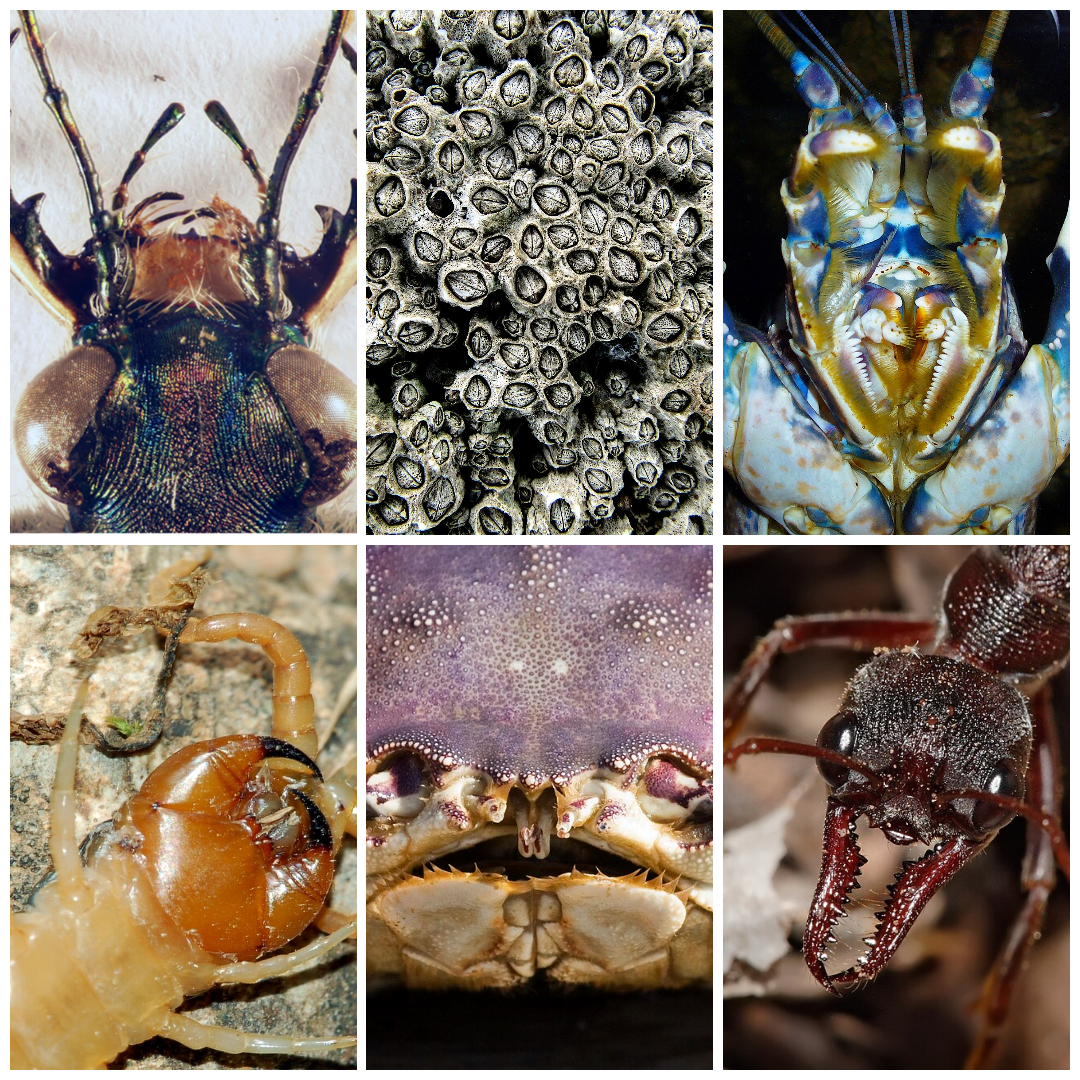
- Mandibulata specimens showcasing the defining feature of the clade: the mandible. Pictured left to right, top to bottom: littoral tiger beetle, barnacles, European lobster, Scolopendra centipede, Dungeness crab, bull ant.
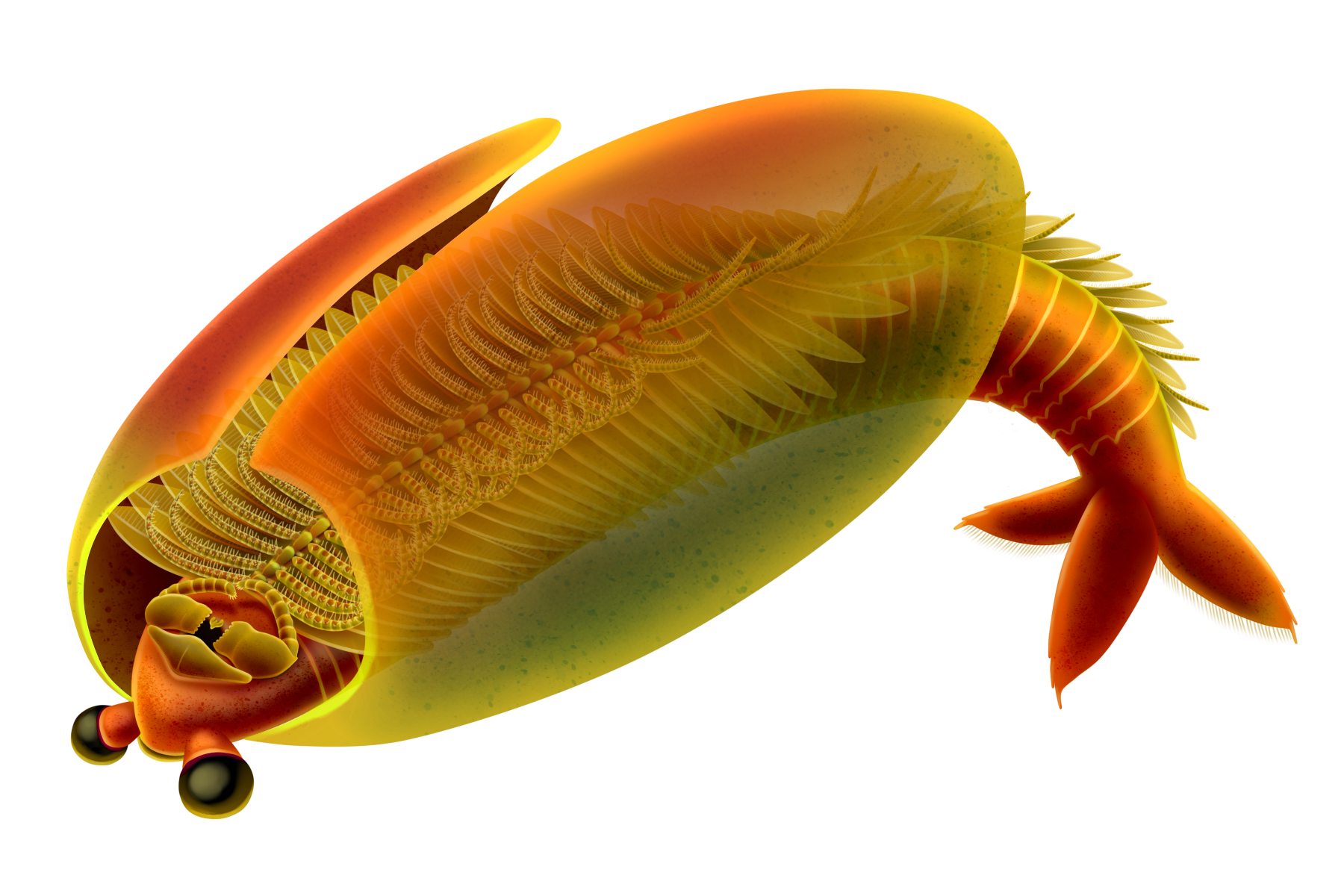
- Life restoration of Odaraia, an early mandibulate belonging to Hymenocarina with mandibles present near the mouth

Scientific classification
- Kingdom: Animalia
- Phylum: Arthropoda
- Clade: Deuteropoda
- Clade: Mandibulata de Clairville, 1798 (sensu Snodgrass 1938)

Subdivisions
- Pancrustacea (including hexapods)
- Myriapoda
- †Euthycarcinoidea
- †Hymenocarina
- †Fuxianhuiida
- †Phosphatocopina
incertae sedis (including possible stem-group mandibulates)
- †Acheronauta?
- †Aquilonifer
- †Bradoriida?
- †Cambropachycopidae?
- †Cambropodus?
- †Captopodus?
- †Cascolus?
- †Martinssonia?
- †Papiliomaris?
- †Parioscorpio?
- †Rhyniognatha?
- †Skaracarida?
- †Tanazios?
- †Marrellomorpha?
- †Thylacocephala?
- †Oelandocarididae?
- †Musacaris?

= Mandibulata =

Mandibulata Temporal range: Cambrian Stage 3–Recent

Clade of arthropods

The clade Mandibulata constitutes one of the two major living subdivisions of the phylum Arthropoda, alongside Chelicerata. Mandibulates include the myriapods (centipedes and millipedes, among others), and the pancrustaceans (including all true insects). The name "Mandibulata" refers to the mandibles, modified pairs of head limbs used in food processing, the presence of which are characteristic of most members of the group. Other characteristics typical for the group include the presence of at least one pair of antennae.

== Characteristics ==
Mandibulates are characterized by a head tagma that has antennae and three feeding appendages that make up the mandible, including the mandible pair proper, the maxillae, as well as the maxillules. All mandibulates ancestrally have a pair of antennae as their first head appendage. Many pancrustaceans also have a second pair of antennae (with the first pair referred as the antennules, while the second pair are considered the "antennae" pair proper), but myriapods, hexapods and many fossil mandibulates lack a second antennae pair.

== Taxonomy ==
The name "Mandibulata" was originally used for a subgroup of insects by Joseph Philippe de Clairville in 1798. In the 1930s, Robert Evans Snodgrass used the name to encompass myriapods, hexapods and crustaceans, which he considered to be united by a number of morphological similarities, including but not limited to the presence of mandibles. This proposal was contested by some other 20th century scholars, who considered mandibles the result of convergent evolution, though the monophyly of Mandibulata is now widely accepted based on genetic evidence.

=== Phylogeny ===
Some studies suggest that Artiopoda, the broader group that contains trilobites and their extinct relatives, is more closely related to Mandibulata than to Chelicerata, and that artiopods and mandibulates are united by their shared presence of antennae, which these authors propose was a shared common ancestral trait. Consequently, the proposed clade containing both Artiopoda and Mandibulata is named Antennulata. This grouping may also contain other extinct arthropod groups like Marrellomorpha, which also bear antennae.

The mandibulates are divided between the extant groups Myriapoda (millipedes and centipedes, among others) and Pancrustacea (including crustaceans and hexapods, the latter group containing insects). Molecular phylogenetic studies suggest that the living arthropods are related as shown in the cladogram below. Crustaceans do not form a monophyletic group as insects and other hexapods have evolved from within them.

Some extinct groups have been placed in Mandibulata, including Hymenocarina, Euthycarcinoidea, and Fuxianhuiida.

Cladogram after Liu et al, 2026:

- Panarthropoda
  - † "Lobopodia" (paraphyletic, ancestral to tardigrades, onychophorans and arthropods)
  - Total group Euarthropoda
    - †Megadictyon
    - - - †Kerygmachela
        - - †Pambdelurion
          - - †Opabiniidae
            - - † Radiodonta (e.g Anomalocaris)
              - Deuteropoda
                - †Erratus
                - - †Sunella
                  - - †Isoxyidae + "Great appendage bivalved forms"
                    - - - †Fengzhengia
                        - †Kylinxia
                      - - †Megacheira
                        - Pan-Chelicerata
                      - - †Kiisortoqia
                        - †Bushizheia
                        - Antennulata
                          - †Artiopoda (including Trilobita)
                          - Mandibulata
                            - †Fuxianhuiida
                            - - †Hymenocarina
                              - - Myriapoda
                                - Pancrustacea

Cladogram of Mandibulata after Laville et al. (2025):

- Mandibulata
  - †Aquilonifer
  - - †Tanazios
    - - - †Acheronauta
        - †Captopodus
      - - - †Nereocaris
          - - †Fuxianhuiida
            - †Hymenocarina
        - - - †Euthycarcinida
            - Myriapoda (including centipedes and millipedes)
          - Pancrustacea
            - Allotriocarida
              - Branchiopoda (tadpole shrimp/Triops, fairy shrimp, clam shrimp, water fleas)
              - - Hexapoda (including springtails and insects)
                - Xenocarida
                  - Cephalocarida (horseshoe shrimp)
                  - Remipedia
            - - Oligostraca
                - Branchiura (fish lice)
                - - Ostracoda
                  - Mystacocaridida
              - Multicrustacea
                - Copepoda
                - - Cirripedia (barnacles)
                  - - †Cyclida (Americlidae)
                    - - †Thylacocephala
                      - - Malacostraca (shrimp, prawn, lobsters, mantis shrimp, crab, woodlice, etc)

== See also ==
- Atelocerata
- Marrellomorpha
- Myriochelata
- Pancrustacea
- Crustaceomorpha
- Antennulata
- Arachnomorpha
- Uniramia
