= Captopodus =

Captopodus Temporal range: Latest Pragian - Emsian 408–400 Ma

Scientific classification
- Kingdom: Animalia
- Phylum: Arthropoda
- Genus: †Captopodus; Kühl & Rust, 2012
- Species: †C. poschmanni

Binomial name
- †Captopodus poschmanni Kühl & Rust, 2012

Genus of Devonian arthropod

Captopodus is an extinct genus of stem-mandibulate known from the Early Devonian. This creature was described in 2012 from four fossils found in the Hunsrück Slate, an early Devonian lagerstätten in Germany that represents one of the few marine sites from the Devonian with soft tissue preservation.

== Description ==
Captopodus is a vermiform (worm-like) arthropod, with over 66 trunk segments each containing a biramous limb pair, with the final segment containing a caudal furca. The head region contains two pairs of appendages, one being antennae, and the other resembling the grasping legs of thylacocephalans. It also has cupola-like structures, the function of which is unknown. The animal measures five to ten centimetres long. It is also very similar to, and probably related to the animal Acheronauta, from the Waukesha Biota.

== Ecology ==
Captopodus seems to have been a scavenger or ambush predator, based on thylacocephalans such as Dollocaris.

== Etymology ==
Captopodus derives from the words "capto" ("grasp") and "podus" ("appendage"). The species name poschmanni derives from Markus Poschmann, who has done preparatory and scientific work on a number of Hunsrück Slate animals.

== Classification ==
When first described in 2012, C. poschmanni was regarded as a basal stem-arthropod, however more recent studies have placed it specifically as a stem-mandibulate. In 2022 when describing Acheronauta, C. poschmanni was placed in a clade formed alongside A. stimulapis and the thylacocephalans as basal mandibulates. The cladogram below shows the position of C. poschmanni in relation to other arthropods based on the findings of Pulsipher et al. (2022).

- Arthropoda
  - †Parioscorpio venator
  - - †Cascolus ravitis
    - - †Tanazios dokeron
      - - - †Captopodus poschmanni
          - - †Acheronauta stimulapis
            - †Thylacocephala
        - - †Occacaris oviformis
          - - - Myriapoda
              - - †Ercaicunia multinodosa
                - - - †Clypecaris pteroidea
                    - - - - †Waptia fieldensis
                          - †Perspicaris dictynna
                        - - †Canadaspis perfecta
                          - - †Tokummia katalepsis
                            - †Branchiocaris pretiosa
                      - - - †Nereocaris exilis
                          - †Odaria alata
                        - - †Euthycarcinoidea
                          - †Fuxianhuiida
                            - †Fuxianhuia
                            - - †Chengjiangocaris
                              - †Shankouia
            - Pancrustacea
              - - Argulus
                - Ostracoda
              - - - †Lepidocaris
                  - - Triops
                    - Artemia
                - - - - Remipedia
                      - Cephalocarida
                    - Hexapoda
                  - Multicrustacea
