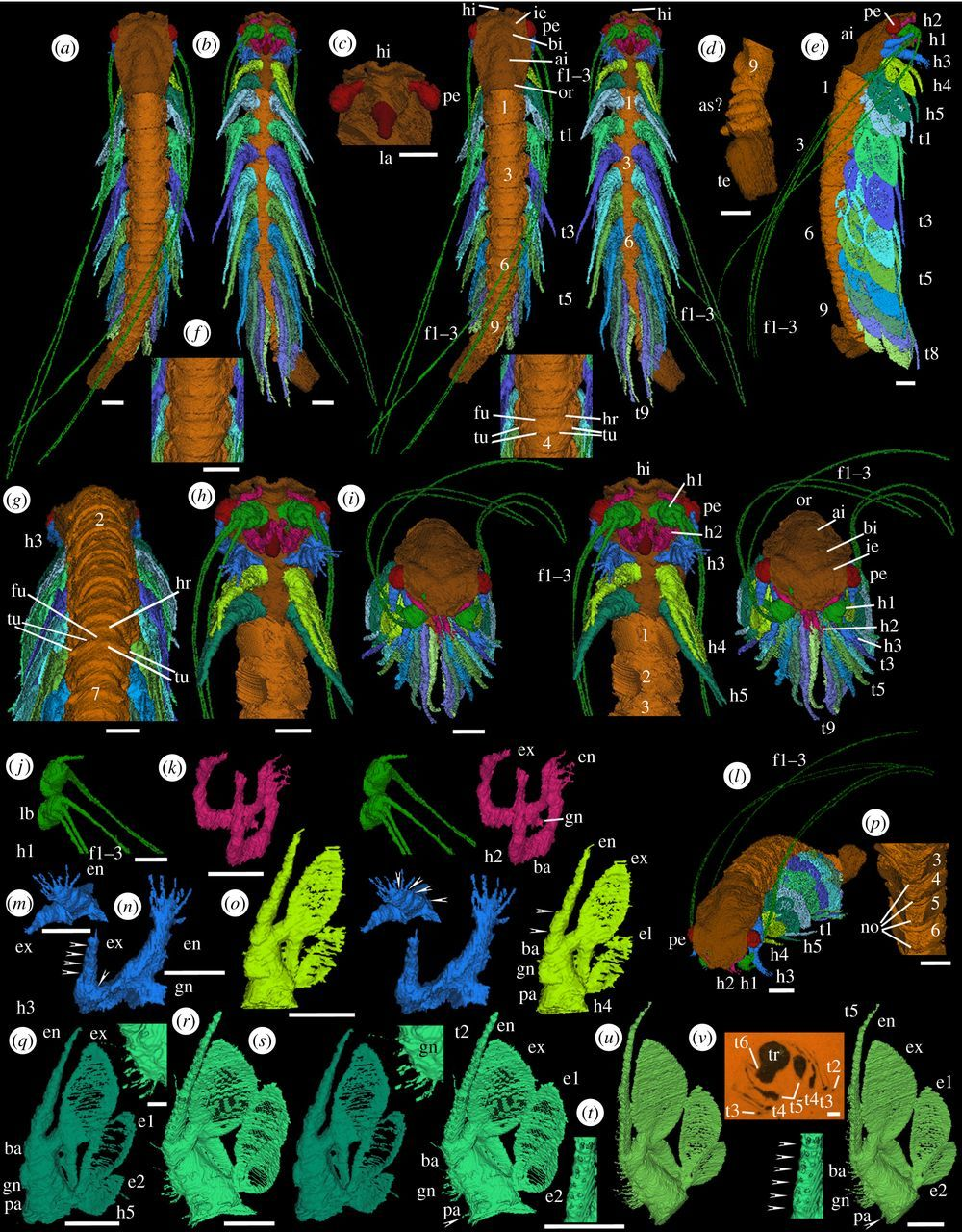
- The digitally reconstructed holotype of Cascolus

Scientific classification
- Kingdom: Animalia
- Phylum: Arthropoda
- Genus: †Cascolus; Siveter et al., 2017
- Species: †C. ravitis

Binomial name
- †Cascolus ravitis Siveter et al., 2017

= Cascolus =

Cascolus Temporal range: Homerian

Silurian genus of arthropods

Cascolus is an extinct genus of stem-mandibulate known from the Coalbrookdale Formation of the United Kingdom.

== Description ==
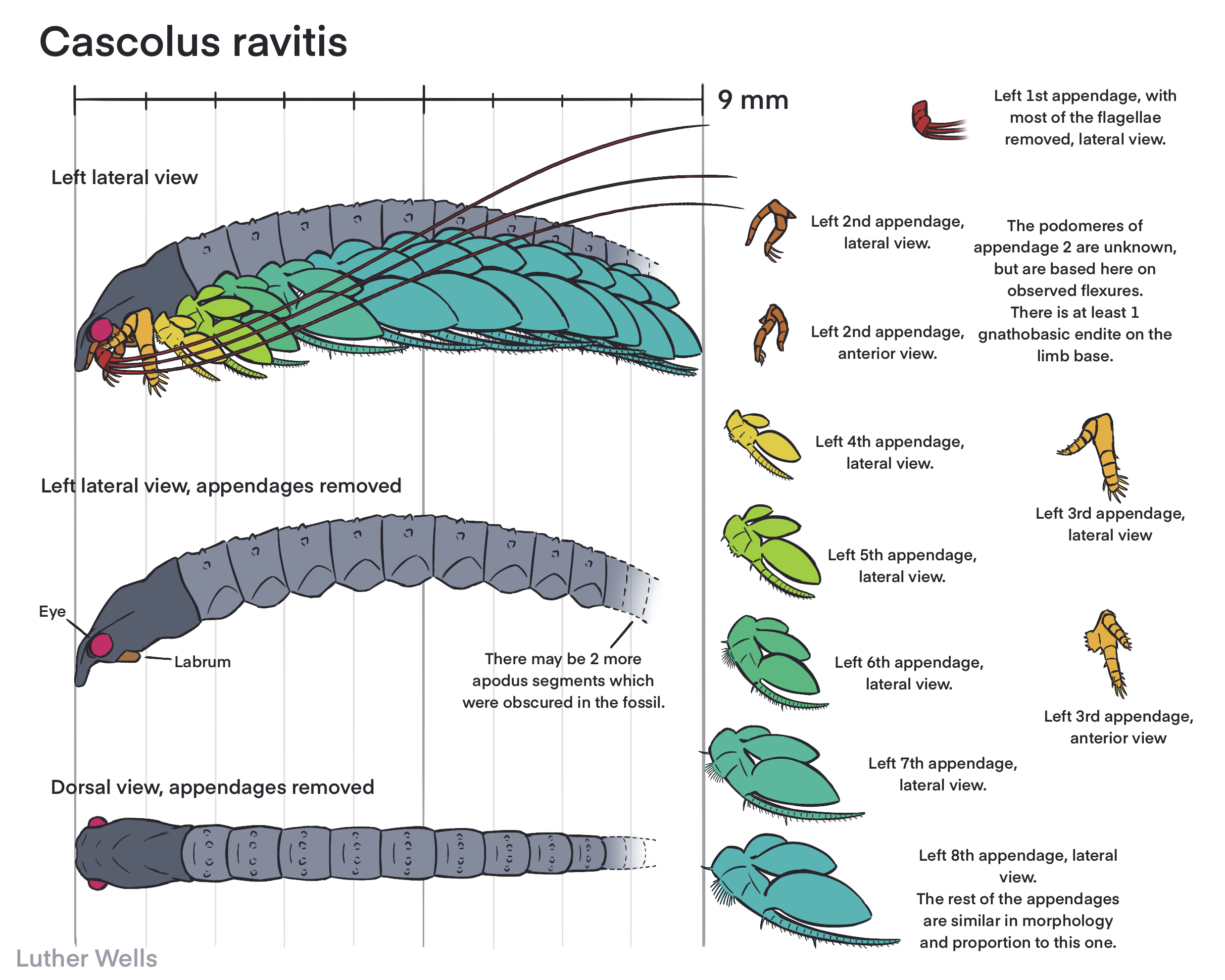
Diagrammatic reconstruction of Cascolus ravitis

Cascolus is a long, somewhat vermiform arthropod, roughly 9 millimetres long. It has a head segment containing a head shield, stalked eyes and five pairs of limbs. The first appendages bore 3 long flagella similar to the first appendages of many megacheirans, and the other four were biramous with gnathobases. The thorax had at least 9 segments, each bearing appendages with a long, spinose, gently tapered endopod and a large flap shaped exopod and two smaller, similarly shaped epipods. The 4th and 5th head appendages were similar to the trunk appendages, but smaller and the 4th only had 1 epipod. Two paired rows of tubercles ran along dorsal side of the trunk and there may have been two possibly limbless segments near the posterior. The trunk remains similar in size through tergites 1-4, and then decreases in width onwards into the limbless segments. The posterior end of the body is not known.

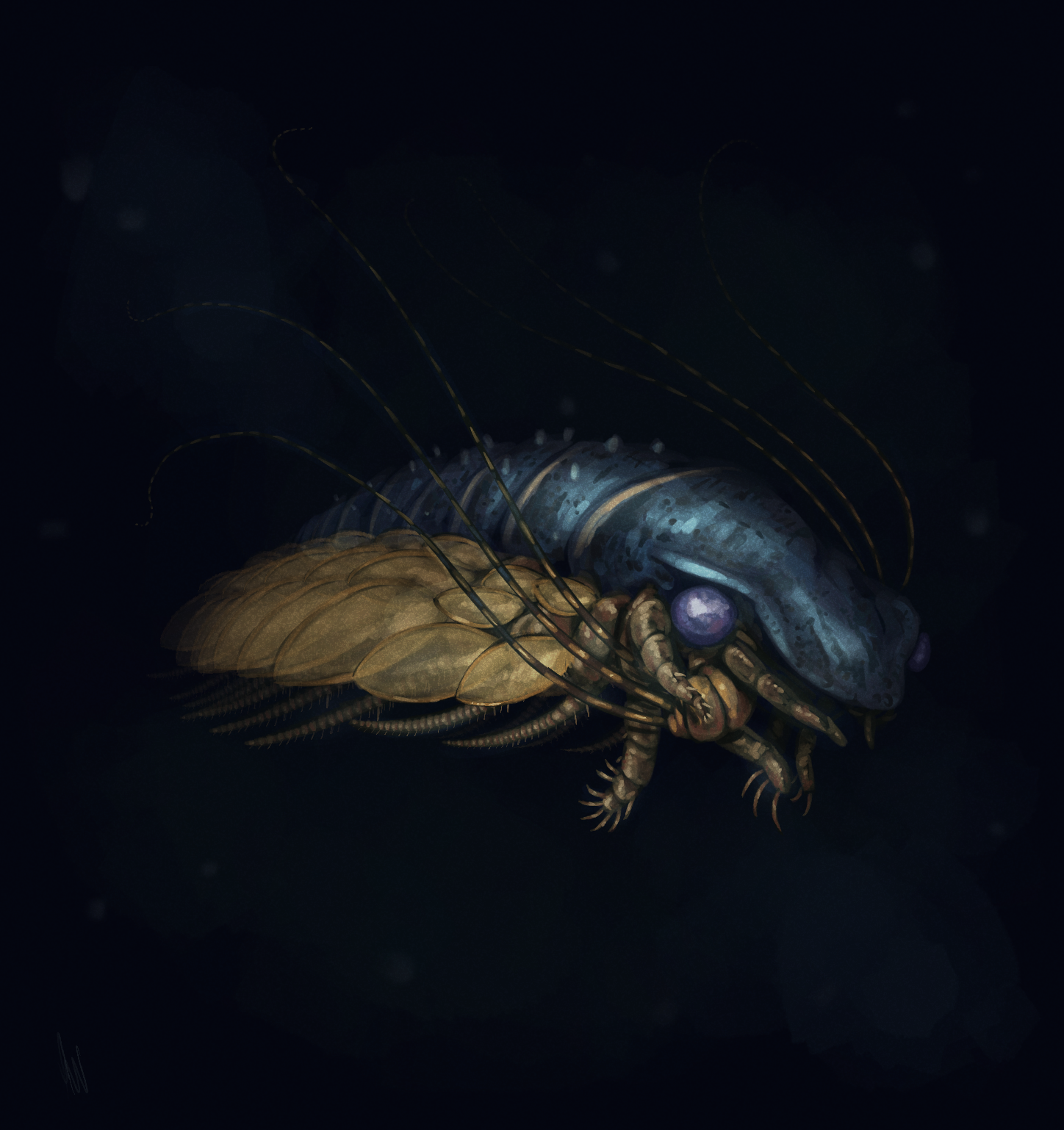
A life reconstruction of Cascolus ravitis

== Ecology ==
Cascolus appears to have been a nektobenthic animal, possibly a scavenger.

== Etymology ==
Cascolus was named in honour of Sir David Attenborough. The genus name derives from "castrum" ("stronghold") and "colus" ("dwelling in"), alluding to the Middle or Old English source for the name "Attenborough". The specific name ravitis derives from "Ratae" (the Roman name for Leicester), "vita" ("life") and "commeatis" ("messenger")

== Distribution ==
Cascolus is known from a single specimen from the Silurian Coalbrookdale Formation in England, a diverse Silurian Lagerstatte.

== Classification ==
Cascolus was originally considered as a stem-group phyllocarid. According to phylogenic analysis in Pulsipher et al. (2022), it is considered as stem-mandibulate instead.

- Total group Mandibulata
  - †Parioscorpio venator
  - - †Cascolus ravitis
    - - †Tanazios dokeron
      - - - †Captopodus poschmanni
          - - †Acheronauta stimulapis
            - †Thylacocephala
        - - †Occacaris oviformis
          - - - Myriapoda
              - - †Ercaicunia multinodosa
                - - - †Clypecaris pteroidea
                    - - - - †Waptia fieldensis
                          - †Perspicaris dictynna
                        - - †Canadaspis perfecta
                          - - †Tokummia katalepsis
                            - †Branchiocaris pretiosa
                      - - - †Nereocaris exilis
                          - †Odaraia alata
                        - - †Euthycarcinoidea
                          - †Fuxianhuiida
            - Pancrustacea (including Hexapoda)

== See also ==
- List of things named after David Attenborough and his works
