= Cicindela hybrida hybrida =

Scientific classification
- Kingdom: Animalia
- Phylum: Arthropoda
- Class: Insecta
- Order: Coleoptera
- Suborder: Adephaga
- Family: Cicindelidae
- Genus: Cicindela
- Species: C. hybrida
- Subspecies: C. h. hybrida

Trinomial name
- Cicindela hybrida hybrida Linnaeus, 1758

Subspecies of beetle

Cicindela hybrida hybrida is the nominate subspecies of the northern dune tiger beetle (Cicindela hybrida). This eurytopic beetle has a wide distribution in the Palaeartic region. It is particularly common in Central Europe, even in artificial habitats.

== Taxonomy ==
C. hybrida was first described by Swedish biologist Carl Linnaeus in 1758. When subspecies were found, this beetle adopted the trinomial name C. h. hybrida.

== Interaction with other species ==
=== Diet ===
Like other tiger beetles, C. h. hybrida is a generalist predator. When presented with prey of different sizes and movement speeds, C. h. hybrida was found to prefer to hunt fast-moving, medium-sized insects, as well as large caterpillars, while avoiding grasshoppers. This may be due to C. h. hybrida's larger mandibles (in comparison to other studied species like Calomera littoralis nemoralis), as its longer mandibles can widen far enough to hold larger prey. It has also been found to occasionally scavenge on dead insects.
