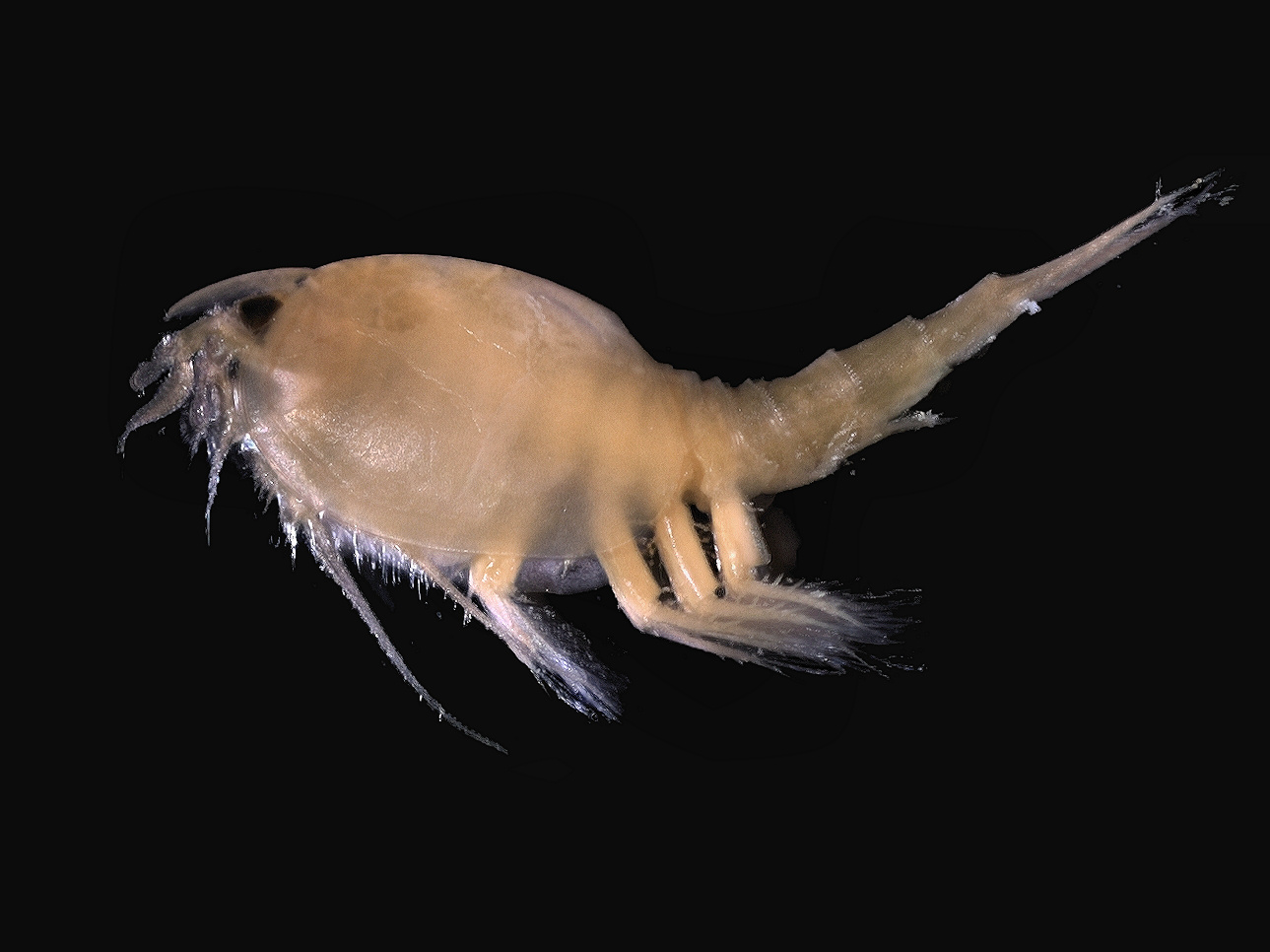
- Nebalia bipes, a leptostracan crustacean

Scientific classification
- Kingdom: Animalia
- Phylum: Arthropoda
- Clade: Crustaceomorpha; Chernyshev, 1960

Clades
- Crustacea; Pseudocrustacea; †Agnostida?; †Waptiidae; †Oelandocarididae; †Cambropachycopidae; †Phosphatocopida; †Isoxyida?; †Bradoriida?; †Euthycarcinoidea?

= Crustaceomorpha =

Crustaceomorpha Temporal range: Cambrian to Recent

Clade of arthropods

Crustaceomorpha is a proposed clade of arthropods that includes crustaceans and numerous extinct groups. Synapomorphies for the clade are that the larval antenna is a feeding or locomotory organ, and there are six endopodal podomeres in post-antennal limbs.

Extinct groups included in Crustaceomorpha vary considerably. It includes Agnostida (usually treated under Trilobita), Waptiida, Isoxyida, Phosphatocopida, and Bradoriida, among others. These primitive crustaceomorphs are grouped under Pseudocrustacea.

The validity of Crustaceomorpha is controversial. It has more support among paleontologists who consider it a sister group to Arachnomorpha, which includes trilobites and chelicerates (see cladogram below). Both are grouped under Schizoramia, a clade of arthropods with biramous appendages. In contrast, neontologists tend to support the Mandibulata clade, which groups members of Crustacea together with Hexapoda and Myriapoda.

- Common ancestor ←
  - Lobopodia
  - - Uniramia
    - Schizoramia
      - Crustaceomorpha
      - Arachnomorpha

== See also ==
- Pancrustacea
- Mandibulata
