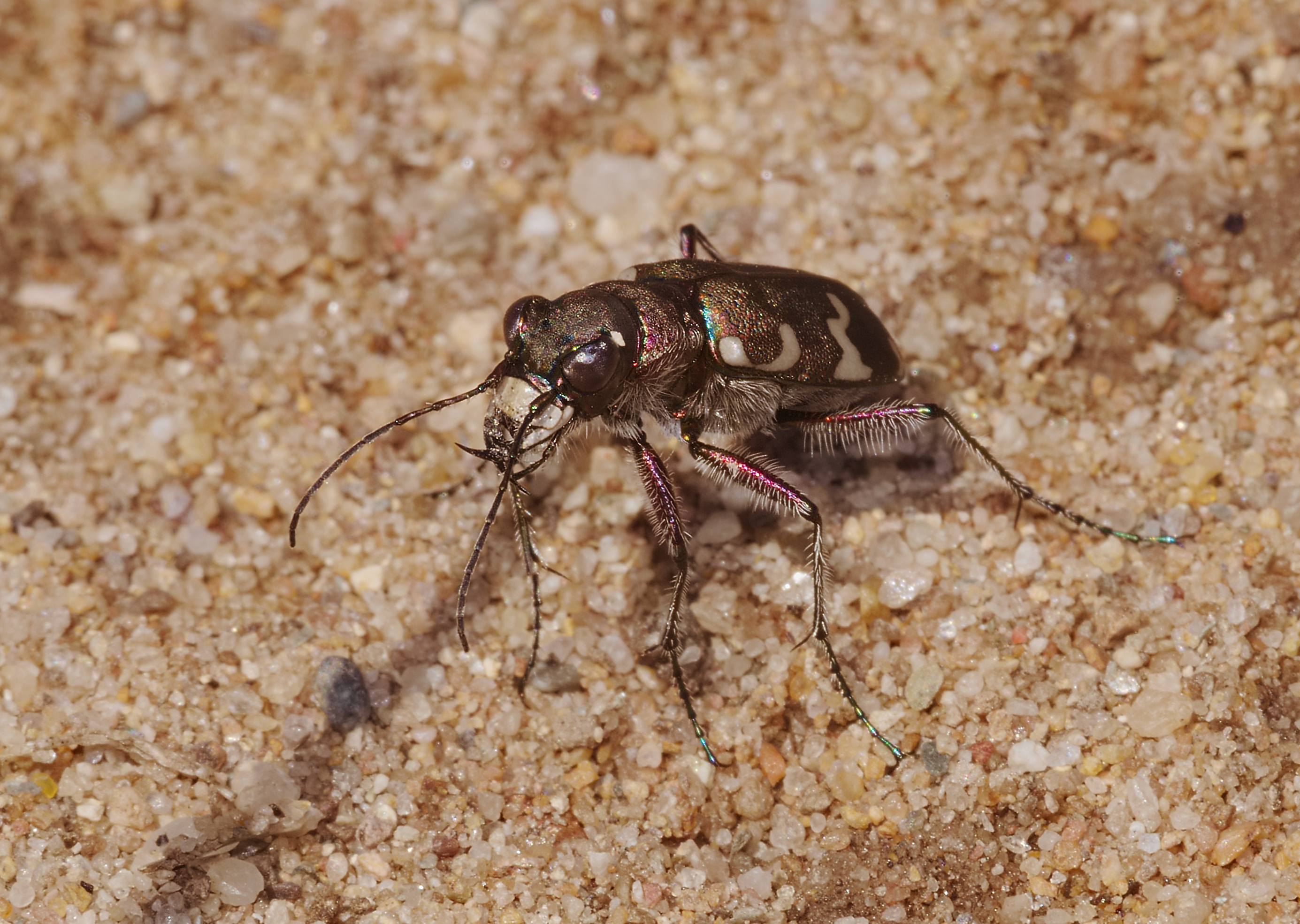

Scientific classification
- Kingdom: Animalia
- Phylum: Arthropoda
- Clade: Pancrustacea
- Class: Insecta
- Order: Coleoptera
- Suborder: Adephaga
- Family: Cicindelidae
- Genus: Cicindela
- Species: C. hybrida

Binomial name
- Cicindela hybrida Linnaeus, 1758

= Cicindela hybrida =

Northern dune tiger beetle

Species of beetle

Cicindela hybrida, also known as the northern dune tiger beetle, has a wide distribution in the Palaearctic region. Cicindela hybrida hybrida is common in Central Europe, even in artificial habitats. In the UK, it is found in heath and dune habitats from April to October and is a medium-sized beetle (12-15mm).

The species is divided into the following subspecies:

- Cicindela hybrida hybrida Linnaeus, 1758
- Cicindela hybrida kozhantshikovi Lutshnik, 1924
- Cicindela hybrida magyarica Roeschke, 1891
- Cicindela hybrida pseudoriparia Mandl, 1935
- Cicindela hybrida transversalis Dejean, 1822

== Gallery ==
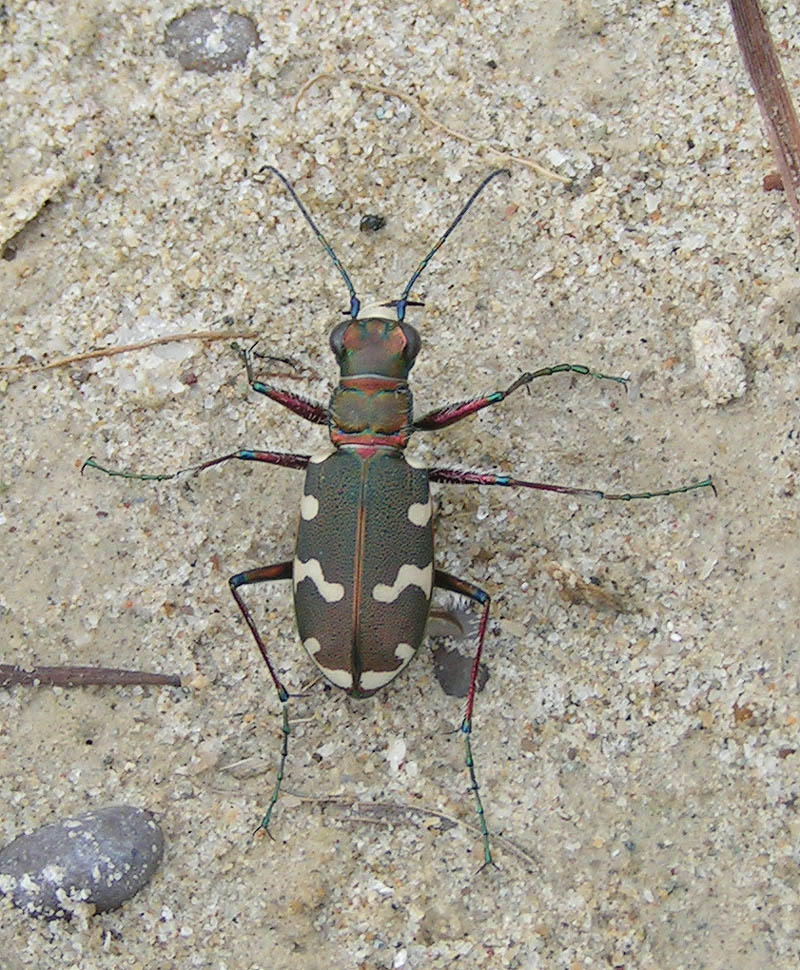

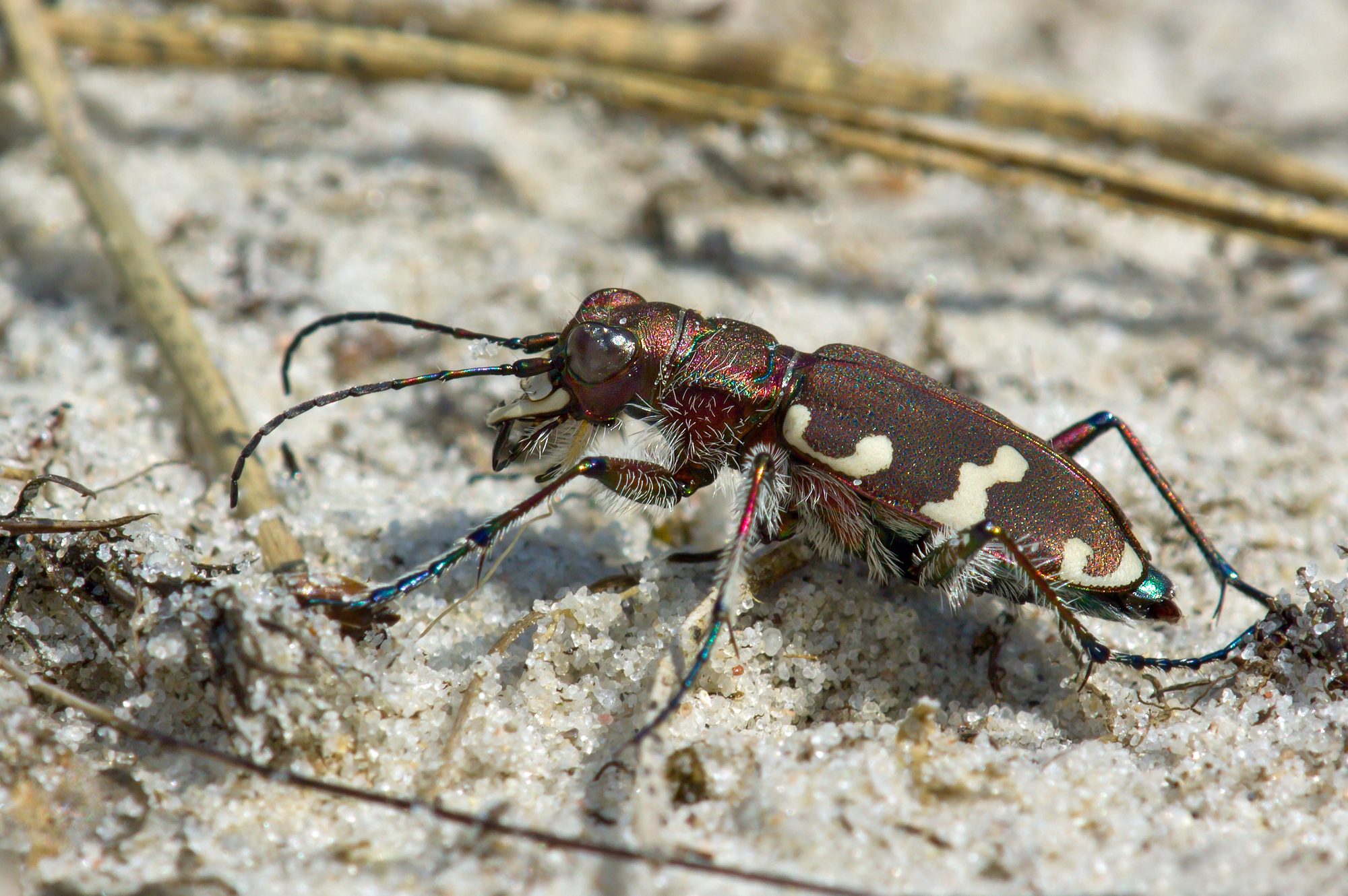
