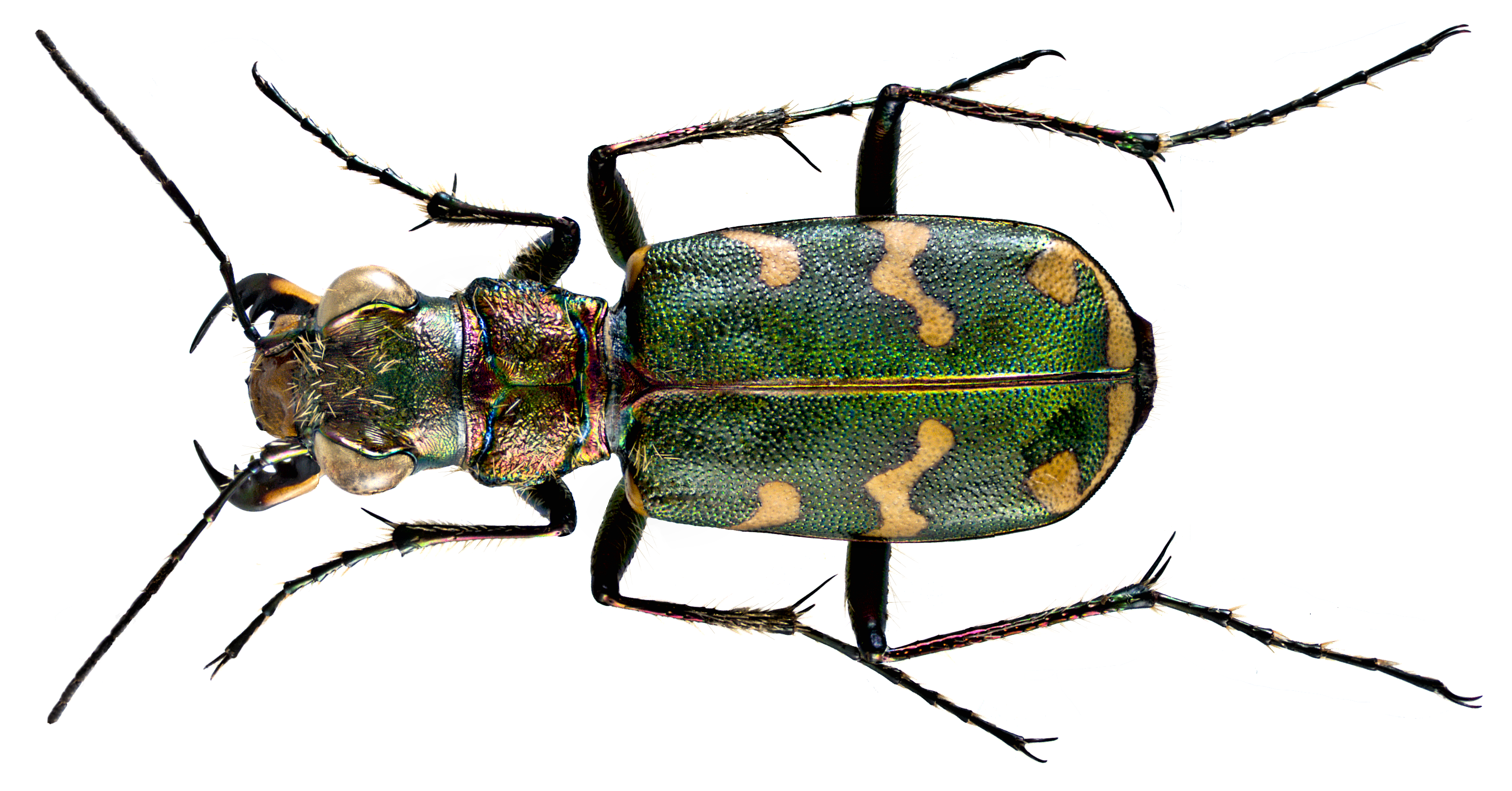

Scientific classification
- Kingdom: Animalia
- Phylum: Arthropoda
- Class: Insecta
- Order: Coleoptera
- Suborder: Adephaga
- Family: Cicindelidae
- Genus: Cicindela
- Species: C. hybrida
- Subspecies: C. h. transversalis

Trinomial name
- Cicindela hybrida transversalis Dejean, 1822

= Cicindela hybrida transversalis =

Subspecies of beetle

Cicindela hybrida transversalis is a subspecies of the northern dune tiger beetle (Cicindela hybrida) found across Central Europe, particularly in Austria and southern France.

== Taxonomy ==
In 1822, French entomologist Pierre François Marie Auguste Dejean first described this beetle as C. riparia. However, upon discovering the name had been previously attributed to a ground beetle, Elaphrus riparius, Dejean renamed the species C. transversalis, although he noted it may actually be a "variety" of C. hybrida.
