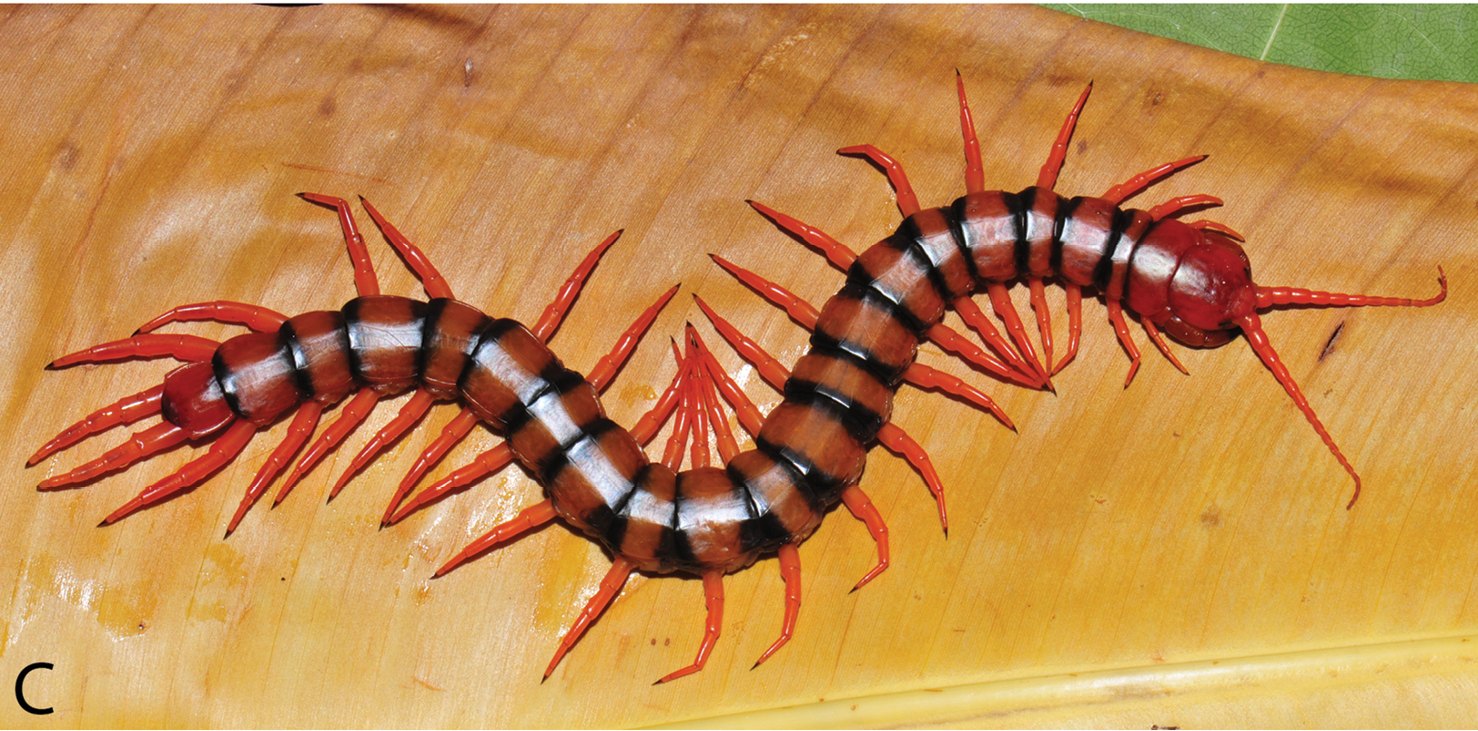
- Scolopendra, a myriapod
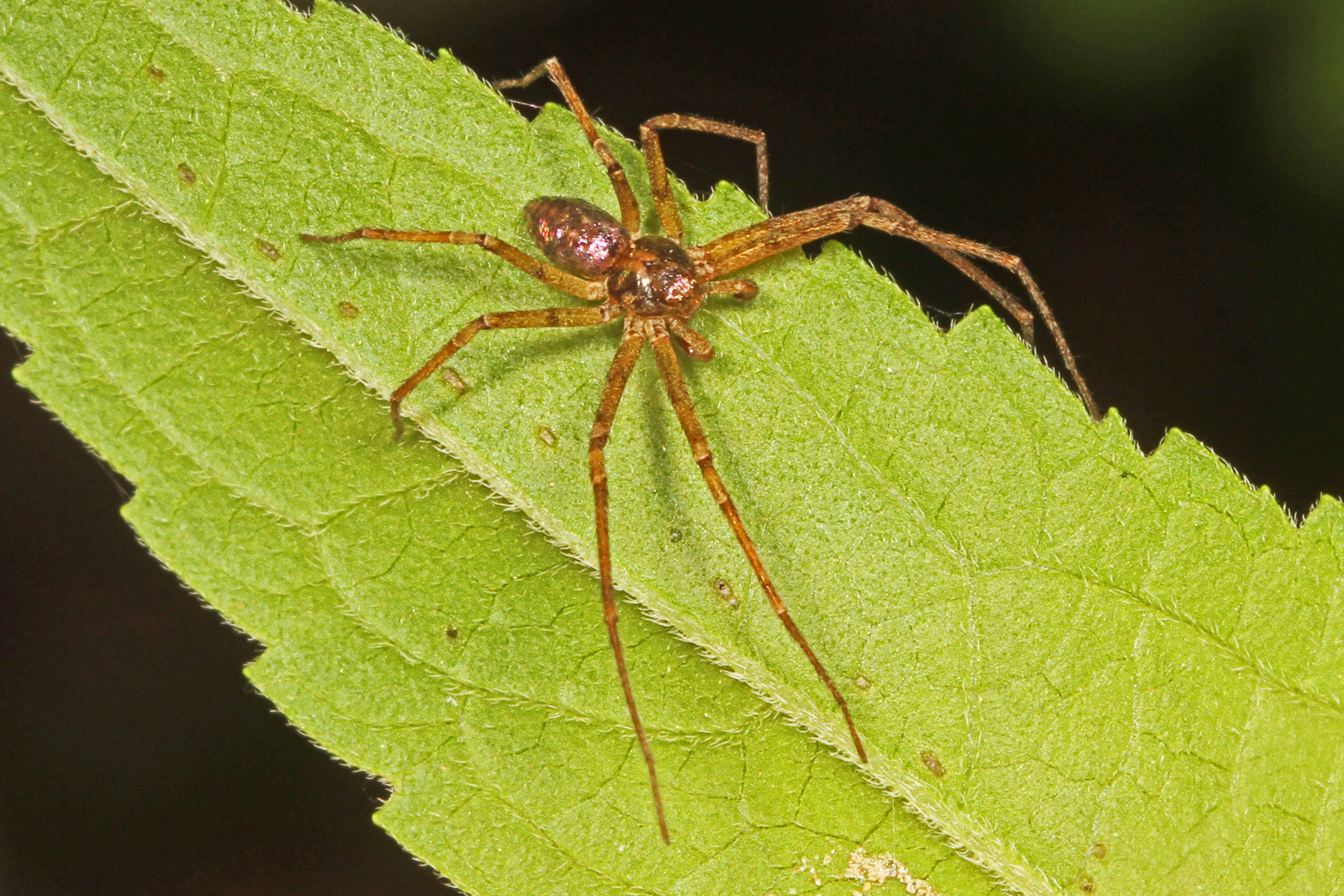
- Philodromus, a chelicerate

Scientific classification
- Domain: Eukaryota
- Kingdom: Animalia
- Phylum: Arthropoda
- (unranked): Myriochelata; Pisani et al., 2004

= Myriochelata =

Myriochelata Temporal range: Cambrian–Recent

Proposed group of arthropods

The Myriochelata or Paradoxopoda, is a proposed grouping of arthropods comprising the Myriapoda (including millipedes and centipedes) and Chelicerata (including spiders and scorpions). If this proposition holds true, the Myriochelata are the sister clade to the Pancrustacea (also Tetraconata), comprising classic crustaceans and hexapods.

The evidence for this relationship between myriapods and chelicerates derives from comparisons of nuclear ribosomal RNA genes, mitochondrial ribosomal RNA genes, and protein-coding genes. More recent molecular studies, however, favour grouping the myriapods with the Pancrustacea, rather than with the chelicerates, to make up the clade Mandibulata.
