= Uniramia =

Group of arthropods

- Arthropoda
  - Uniramia
    - Onychophora
    - Hexapoda
    - Myriapoda
  - Crustacea
  - Chelicerata

S. M. Manton's (1973) polyphyletic arthropod hypothesis with Uniramia as one of three subphyla.

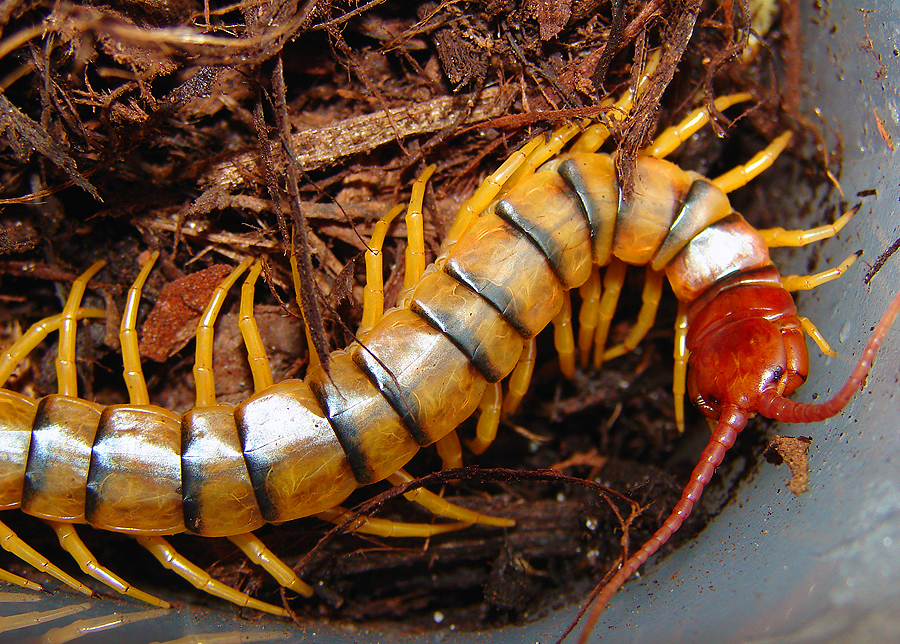
As members of Myriapoda, centipedes like this Scolopendra polymorpha are part of subphylum Uniramia

Uniramia (uni – one, ramus – branch, i.e. single-branches) is formerly recognised group within Arthropoda, now recognised as non-monophyletic, united by their strictly uniramous (single branched) appendages.

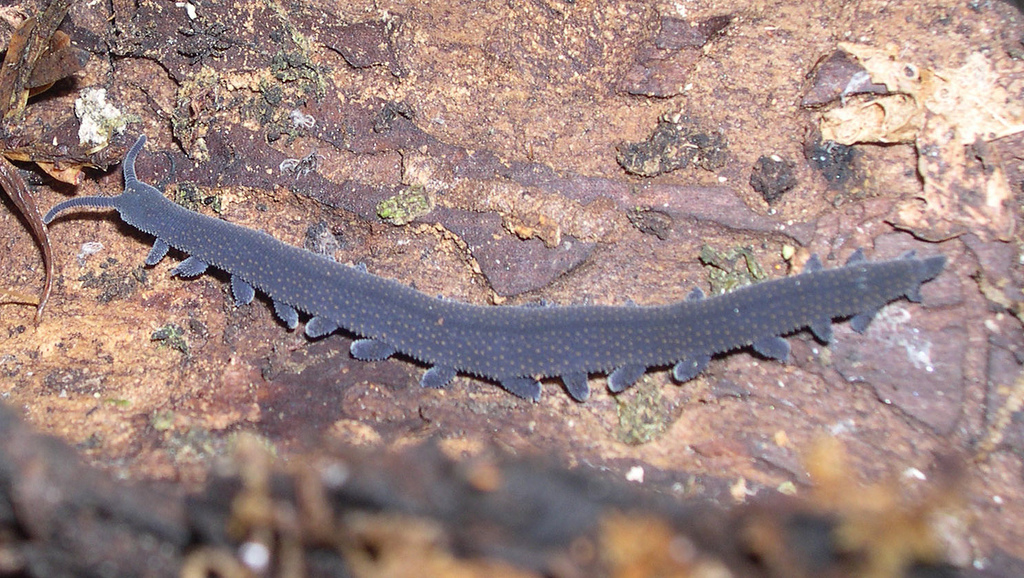
Onychophora like this Peripatoides sp. are no longer counted as unirames.

Uniramia was one of three subphyla in the Arthropoda classification suggested by Sidnie Manton. This classification divided arthropods into a three-phyla polyphyletic group, with phylum Uniramia including the Hexapoda (insects), Myriapoda (centipedes and millipedes) and the Onychophora (velvetworms). The discovery of fossil lobopods, determined to be intermediate between onychophorans and arthropods led to the splintering of the Lobopoda and Onychophora into separate groups.

The name Uniramia was temporarily rejected as a polyphyletic group, but was later redefined to only include Myriapoda and Hexapoda. This subphylum Uniramia was considered to be characterized by their uniramous (single-branching) appendages, one pair of antennae and two pairs of mouthparts (single pairs of mandibles and maxillae). Their body forms and ecologies are diverse. While most unirames are terrestrial, "some are aquatic for part or all of their life cycles." Atelocerata is described as replacing Uniramia in early twentieth-century texts (Heymons, 1901), where it was the preferred name for the category uniting the Hexapoda (insects) + Myriapoda; but depending on the source, the term Atelocerata may have replaced Mandibulata, be an infraphylum beneath Mandibulata, or may no longer be a valid category after closer, cladistics-based genetic study.

- - Chelicerata
    - - Arachnida
      - Merostomata
    - Pycnogonida
- - Trilobitomorpha
  - - Uniramia
      - Myriapoda
        - - Symphyla
          - Chilopoda
        - Diplopoda
      - Hexapoda
        - Entognatha
        - Ectognatha
    - Crustacea

Uniramia as a subphylum

The Crustacea were generally considered the closest relatives of the Uniramia, and sometimes these were united as Mandibulata. However, the competing hypothesis — that Crustacea and Hexapoda form a monophyletic group, the Pancrustacea, to which the Myriapoda are the closest relatives — has support from molecular and fossil evidence.
