= Cicindela hybrida pseudoriparia =

Scientific classification
- Kingdom: Animalia
- Phylum: Arthropoda
- Clade: Pancrustacea
- Class: Insecta
- Order: Coleoptera
- Suborder: Adephaga
- Family: Cicindelidae
- Genus: Cicindela
- Species: C. hybrida
- Subspecies: C. h. pseudoriparia

Trinomial name
- Cicindela hybrida pseudoriparia Mandl, 1935

Subspecies of beetle

Cicindela hybrida pseudoriparia is a subspecies of the northern tiger dune beetle (Cicindela hybrida) primarily found near the Bay of Biscay, particularly along the western coast of France.

== Taxonomy ==
In 1935, Austrian entomologist Karl Mandl distinguished C. h. pseudoriparia from other Cicindela subspecies present in France, with C. h. pseudoriparia spanning the French coast from the Pyrénées-Atlantiques to Normandy. French entomologist René Jeannel seconded this assertion in 1941, writing that C. h. pseudoriparia is the subspecies most common in beaches and maritime areas.

This distinction has been the subject of criticism, though, because the C. hybrida subspecies of France are differentiated primarily by their ranges, not by evolutionary differences; for example, C. h. pseudoriparia is not significantly better suited for coastal areas than similar subspecies.
