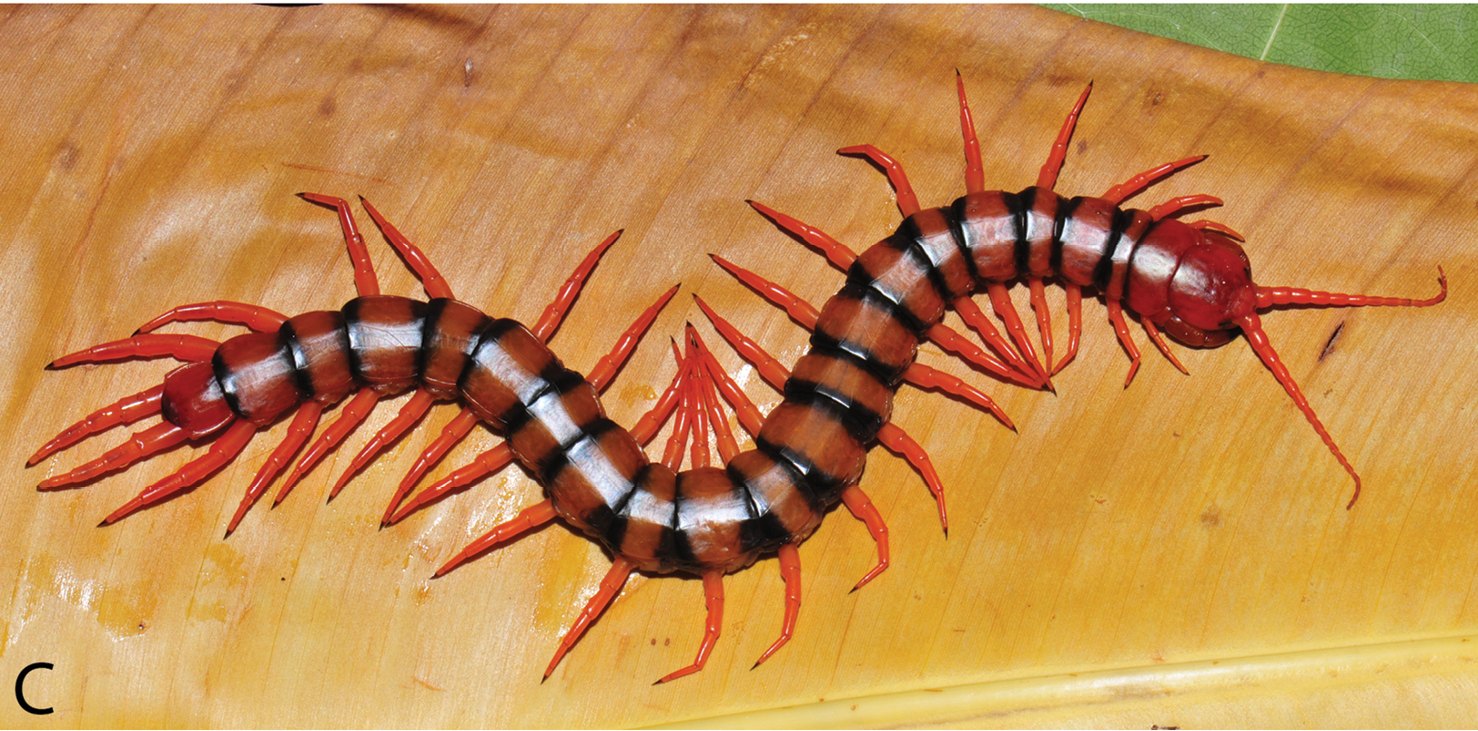
- Scolopendra, a myriapod
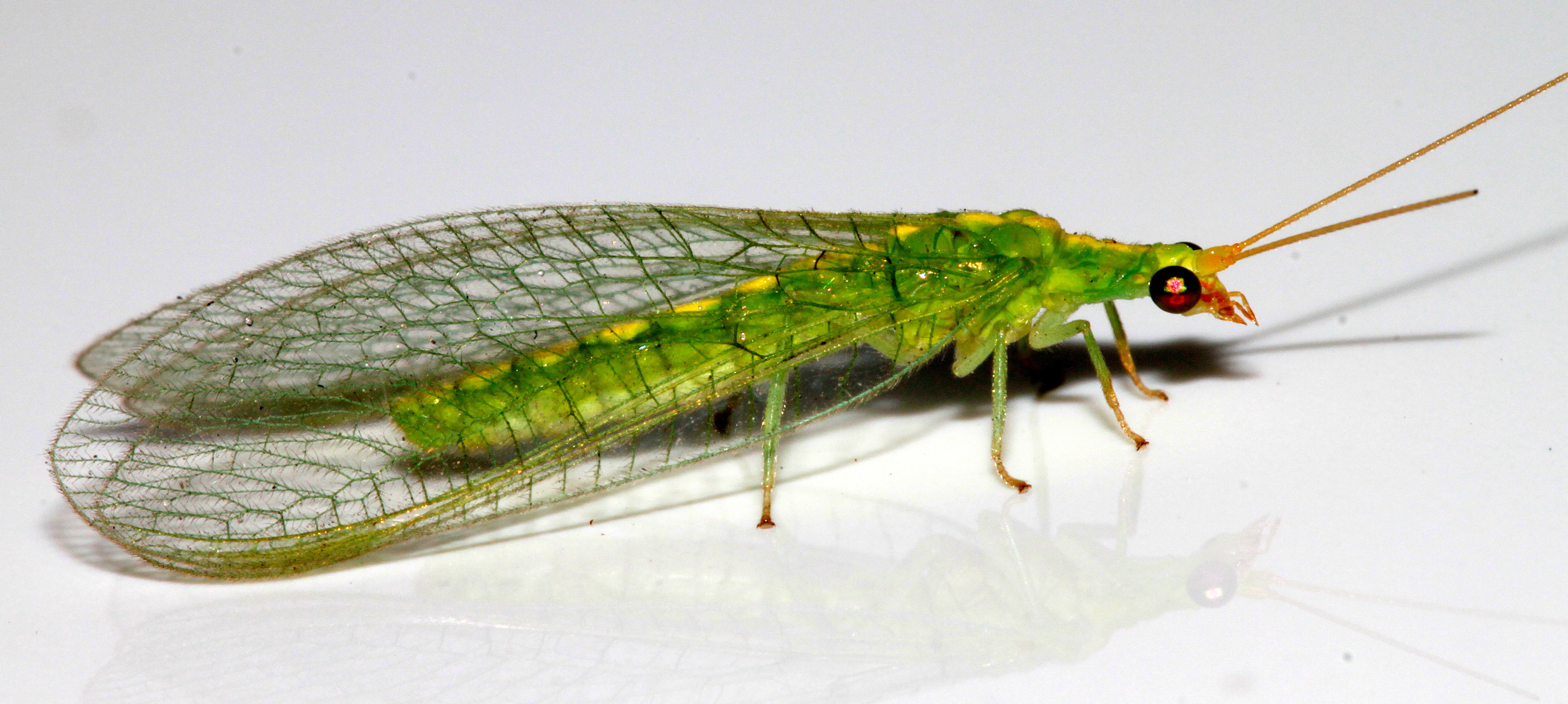
- Chrysoperla, a hexapod

Scientific classification
- Kingdom: Animalia
- Phylum: Arthropoda
- (unranked): Atelocerata Heymons, 1901

= Atelocerata =

Atelocerata Temporal range: Silurian–Recent

Proposed clade of arthropods

Atelocerata is a proposed clade of arthropods that includes Hexapoda (insects and a few related taxa) and Myriapoda (millipedes, centipedes, and similar taxa), but excludes Crustacea (such as shrimp and lobsters) and Chelicerata (such as spiders and horseshoe crabs). The name is currently used interchangeably with Tracheata. or Uniramia sensu stricto. It is an extensive division of arthropods comprising all those that breathe by tracheae, as distinguished from Crustacea, which breathe by means of gills.

The name Tracheata is an older term, originally proposed by Ernst Haeckel in 1866 as a grouping of arachnids, myriapods and insects. Tracheata was redefined to exclude arachnids by Pocock in 1893.(reviewed in Koenemann et al.) The name Atelocerata was first proposed by Richard Heymons in 1901, and the two names are considered equivalent.

The status of Atelocerata as a true clade is now doubted by molecular phylogenetic studies. Some recent authors have viewed the crustaceans as more closely related to hexapods than myriapods are. If this is true, then characters shared by hexapods and myriapods, but not crustaceans, must be the result of either convergence, or secondary loss in the Crustacea.
