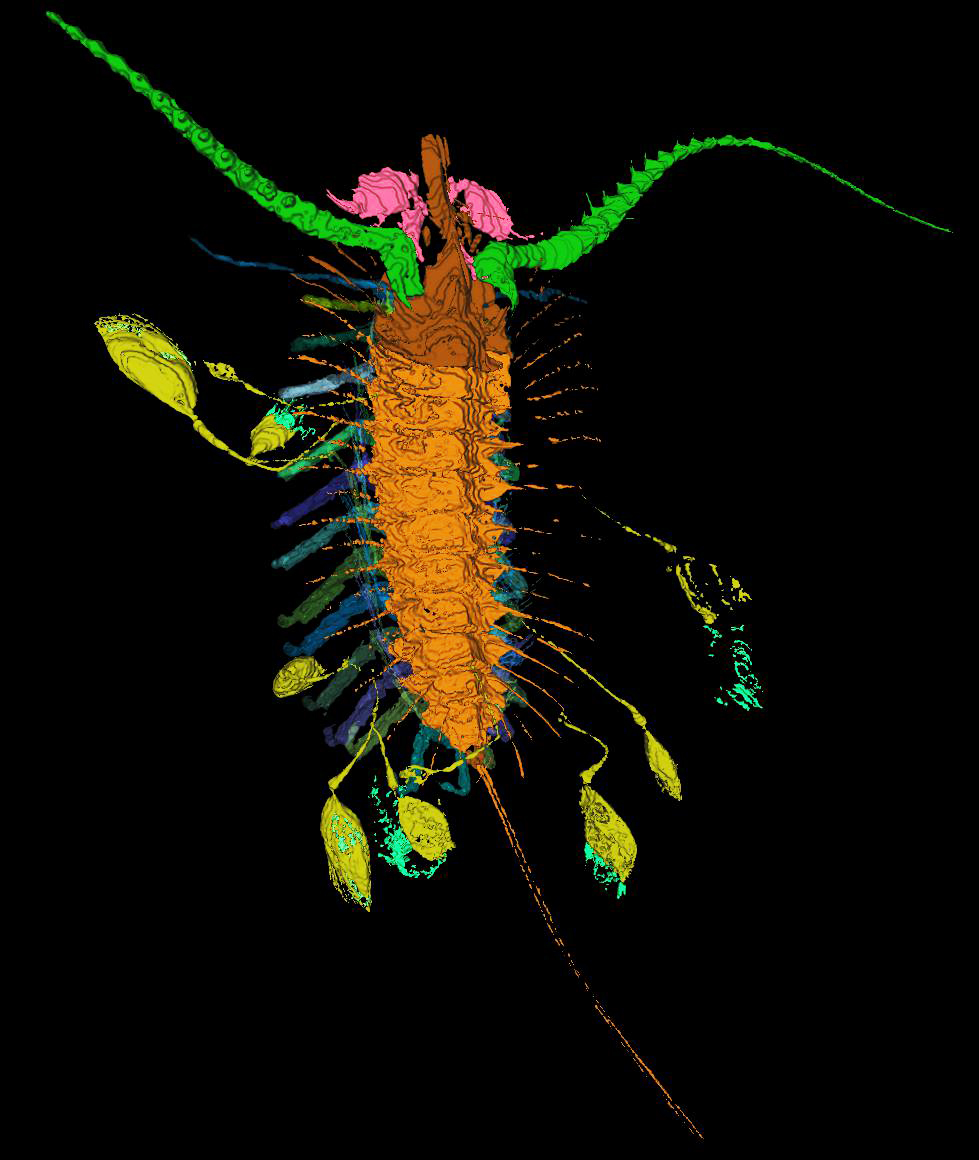
- Aquilonifer spinosus

Scientific classification
- Kingdom: Animalia
- Phylum: Arthropoda
- Stem group: Mandibulata
- Genus: †Aquilonifer; Briggs et al., 2016
- Species: †A. spinosus

Binomial name
- †Aquilonifer spinosus Briggs et al., 2016

= Aquilonifer =

Aquilonifer Temporal range: Wenlock ~430 Ma

Extinct arthropod

Aquilonifer spinosus is an extinct species of arthropod from the Silurian period. It is known from a single fossil specimen found in the Wenlock Series Lagerstätte of Herefordshire, England, in rocks about 430 million years old. The 1 cm long specimen is a stem-group mandibulate, not directly related to any living species. The many-legged, eyeless adult has ten unusual tethered appendages, interpreted as juveniles attached to the parent, in a unique form and previously unknown brooding behaviour.

Studies in 2018 and 2022 unexpectedly recovered Aquilonifer as a possible close relative of Pycnogonida and Marrellomorpha, suggesting that the latter is a paraphyletic group.

== Etymology ==
"Aquilone" is Italian for "toy kite", and the suffix "–ifer" means "to carry". "Spinosus" means "spiny" in Latin. Its discoverers have nicknamed it "the kite runner".

== Description ==
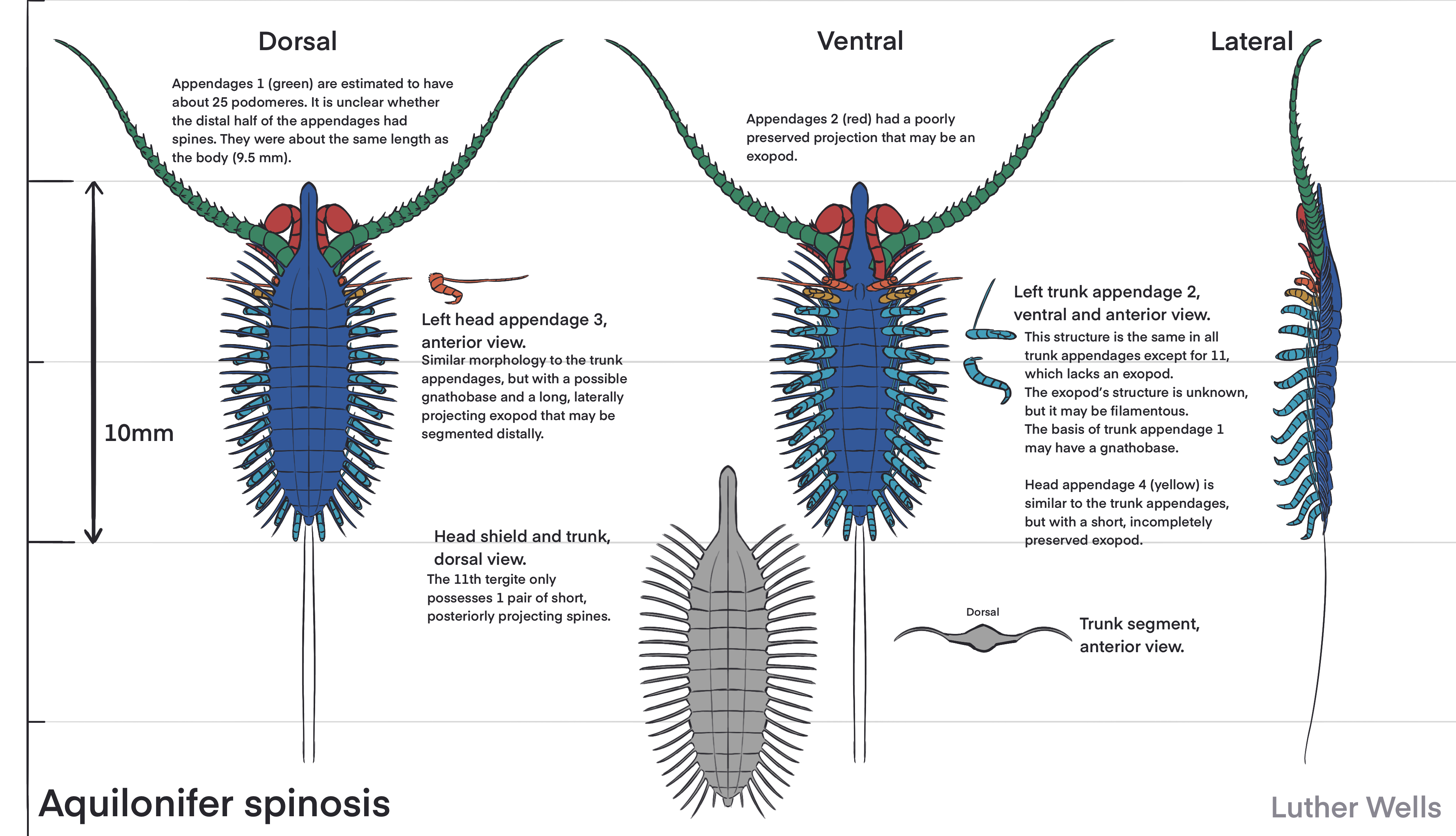
Reconstruction of Aquilonifer spinosis from dorsal, ventral, and lateral view

The length of the body from rostrum to telson is 9.5 millimetres (0.37 in). They lacked eyes but had a pair of antennae the same length as the main body. The cerci are 7.3 millimetres (0.29 in) long. The head shield has a narrow, flat rostrum and 4 pairs of long curved spines projecting laterally. On the underside of the head, along with the antennae they have a pair of chelae-like appendages and 2 pairs of appendages similar to the limbs of the trunk. The first 10 body segments have 2 pairs of spines similar to those on the head, while the 11th body segment only has one pair of short, posteriorly projecting spines. Each body segment has a pair of limbs, each (except for the last limb pair) with a long, possibly filamentous exopod projecting anteriorly.

The 10 individuals proposed to be juvenile Aquilonifer are contained in lemon-shaped capsules that range from .6–2 millimetres (0.024–0.079 in) in length, and are attached to the spines of the adult specimen by long threads. Some of the specimens inside the capsules preserve several pairs of limbs, some of which are protruding from a gap in the capsule.

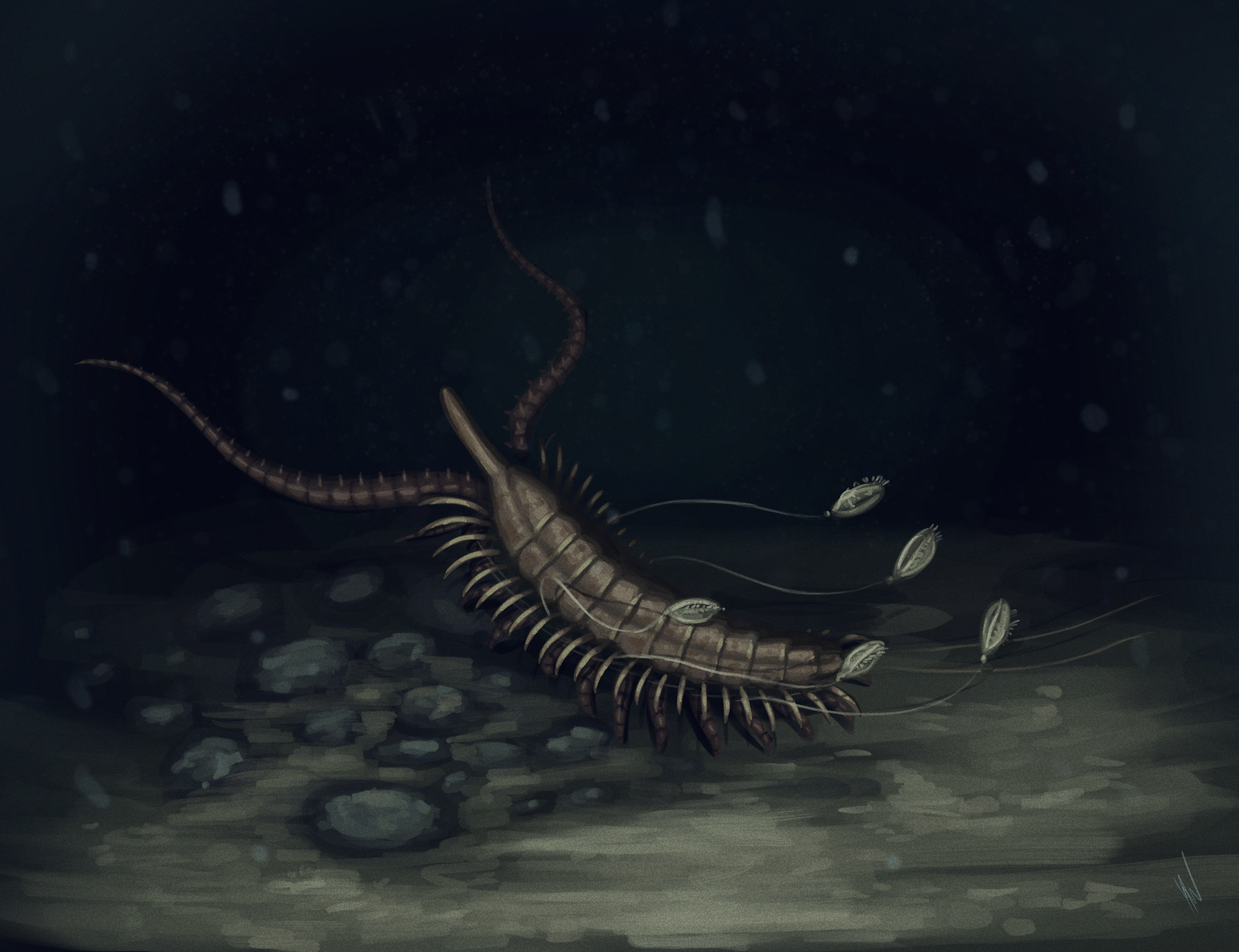
Life reconstruction of an adult Aquilonifer spinosis with 5 juveniles

== Paleoecology ==
Adult Aquilonifer were likely benthic sediment feeders, while the juveniles may have fed on plankton. The long tethers may have allowed the juveniles to feed higher in the water column.
