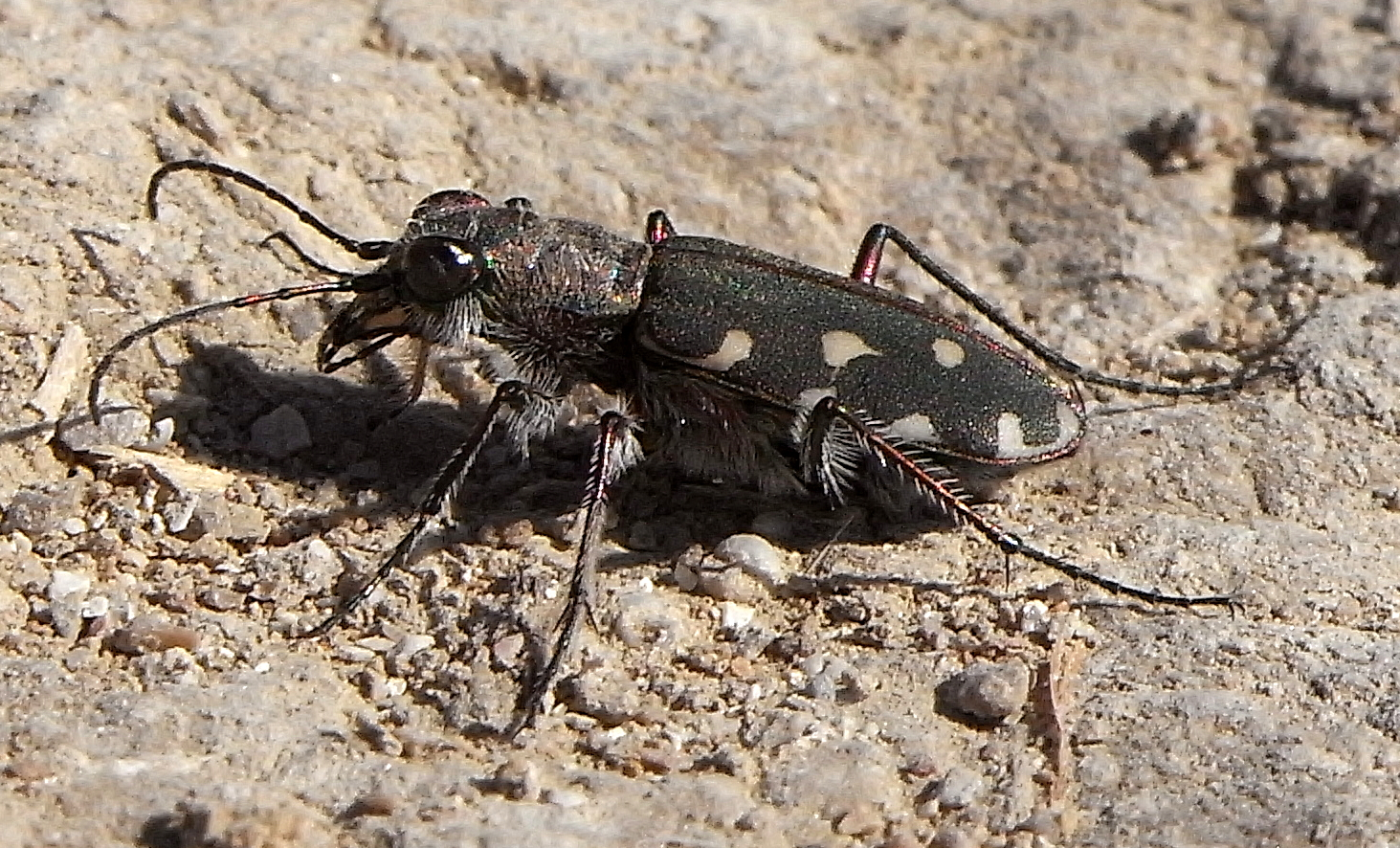
- Cicindela (C.) littoralis subsp. littoralis

Scientific classification
- Kingdom: Animalia
- Phylum: Arthropoda
- Clade: Pancrustacea
- Class: Insecta
- Order: Coleoptera
- Suborder: Adephaga
- Family: Cicindelidae
- Genus: Cicindela
- Subgenus: Calomera
- Species: C. littoralis

Binomial name
- Cicindela littoralis (Fabricius, 1787)

Subspecies (Note: Subspecies listed here are based on EOL data; other taxonomic databases give different subspecies.)
- C. l. afghana (Mandl, 1955); C. l. aulicoides (Sahlberg, 1913); C. l. conjunctaepustulata (Dokhtouroff, 1887); C. l. fiorri (Grandi, 1906); C. l. littoralis (Fabricius, 1787); C. l. nemoralis (Olivier, 1790); C. l. peipingensis (Mandl, 1934); C. l. quadrapuncta (Rossi, 1790); C. l. reductemaculata (Mandl, 1934; C. l. winkeri (Mandl, 1934
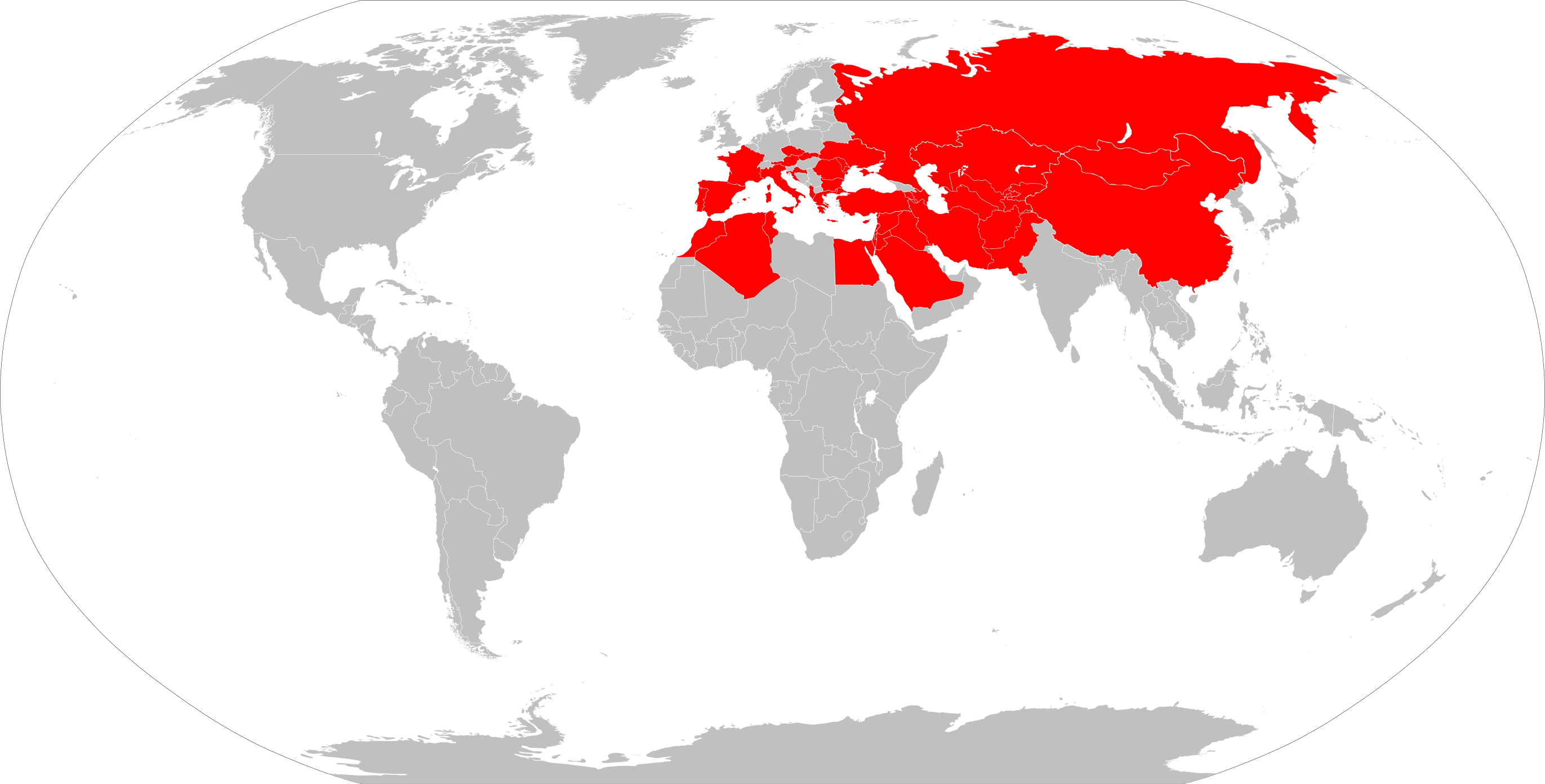

= Cicindela littoralis =

Tiger beetle species

Hunting behaviour on the shore of Lake Zakher, United Arab Emirates

Cicindela (Calomera) littoralis, (Note: Genus Cicindela subgenus Calomera species littoralis.) commonly known as the littoral tiger beetle, is a species of Tiger Beetle found across the Palearctic realm, especially around the Mediterranean and Black seas. One of its subspecies, Calomera littoralis nemoralis, was the first member of the Cicindelidae family to exhibit vegetarian feeding behaviour, having been observed feeding on maize and cooked pasta in large numbers.

== Notable subspecies ==
=== Cicindela littoralis nemoralis ===
Cicindela littoralis nemoralis is common in Southern Europe.
