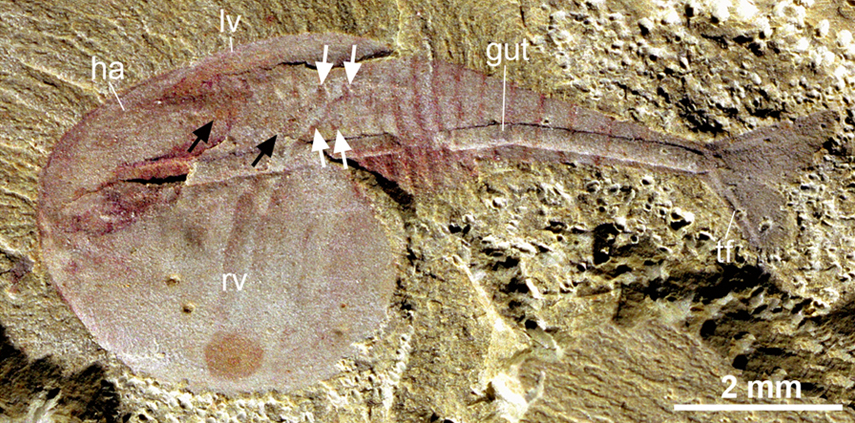
- Fossil of C. pteroidea
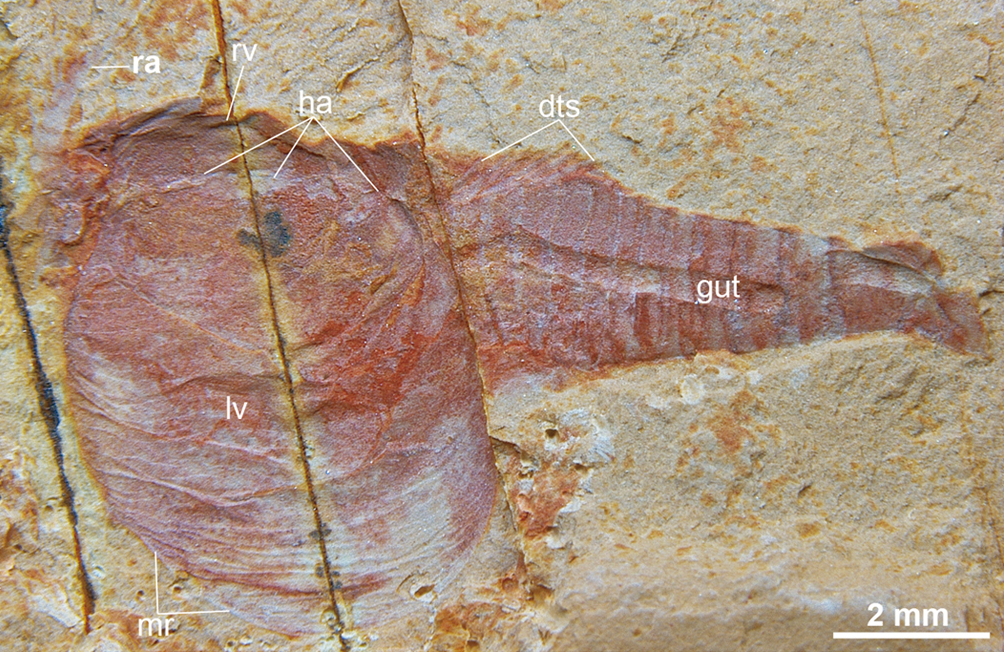
- Fossil of C. serrata

Scientific classification
- Kingdom: Animalia
- Phylum: Arthropoda
- Order: †Hymenocarina
- Genus: †Clypecaris; Hou, 1999

Species
- Clypecaris pteroidea Hou, 1999; Clypecaris serrata Yang et al, 2016

= Clypecaris =

Clypecaris Temporal range: Cambrian Stage 3

Extinct genus of arthropods

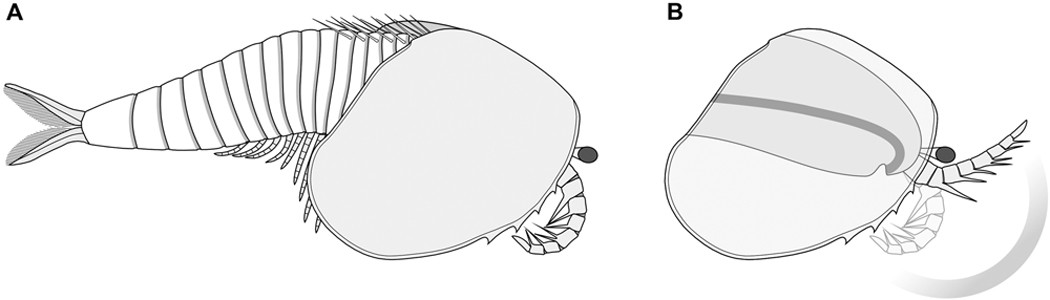

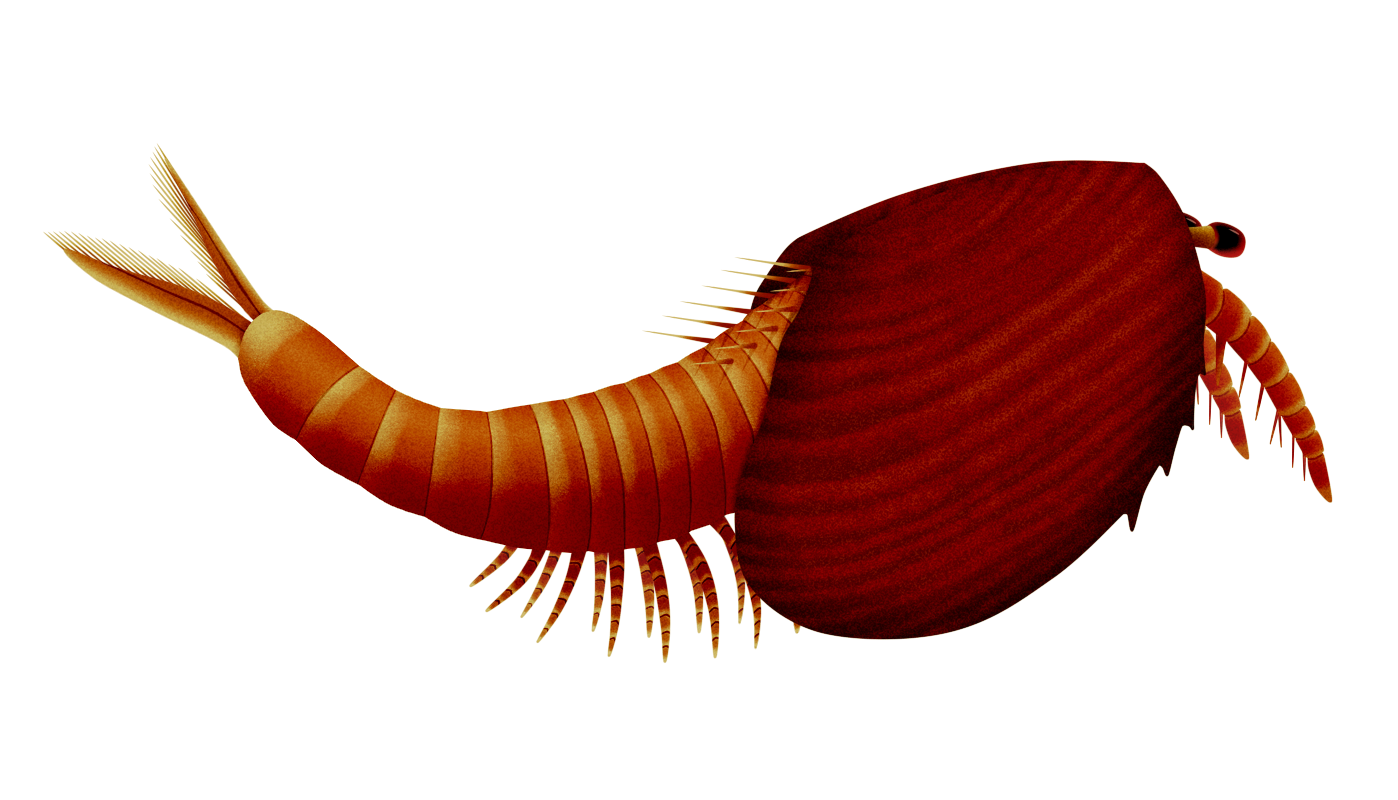
Reconstructions of Clypecaris serrata

Clypecaris is genus of bivalved Cambrian arthropod known from the Chengjiang biota of Yunnan, China. The genus was initially described for the type species C. pteroidea by Hou, 1999. A second species C. serrata was described by Yang et al. in 2016. The species are primarily distinguished by the presence of a serrated edge on the front of the carapace of C. serrata. C. serrata is noted for the modification of an anterior pair of limbs into spined grasping appendages, indicating a predatory lifestyle. It is unknown whether a similar structure was present in C. pteroidea. Clypecaris is considered to likely be a member or a close relative of Hymenocarina, and is closely related to Perspicaris. As well as to Ercaicunia.

== See also ==
- Arthropod
- Cambrian explosion
- Chengjiang biota
  - List of Chengjiang Biota species by phylum
