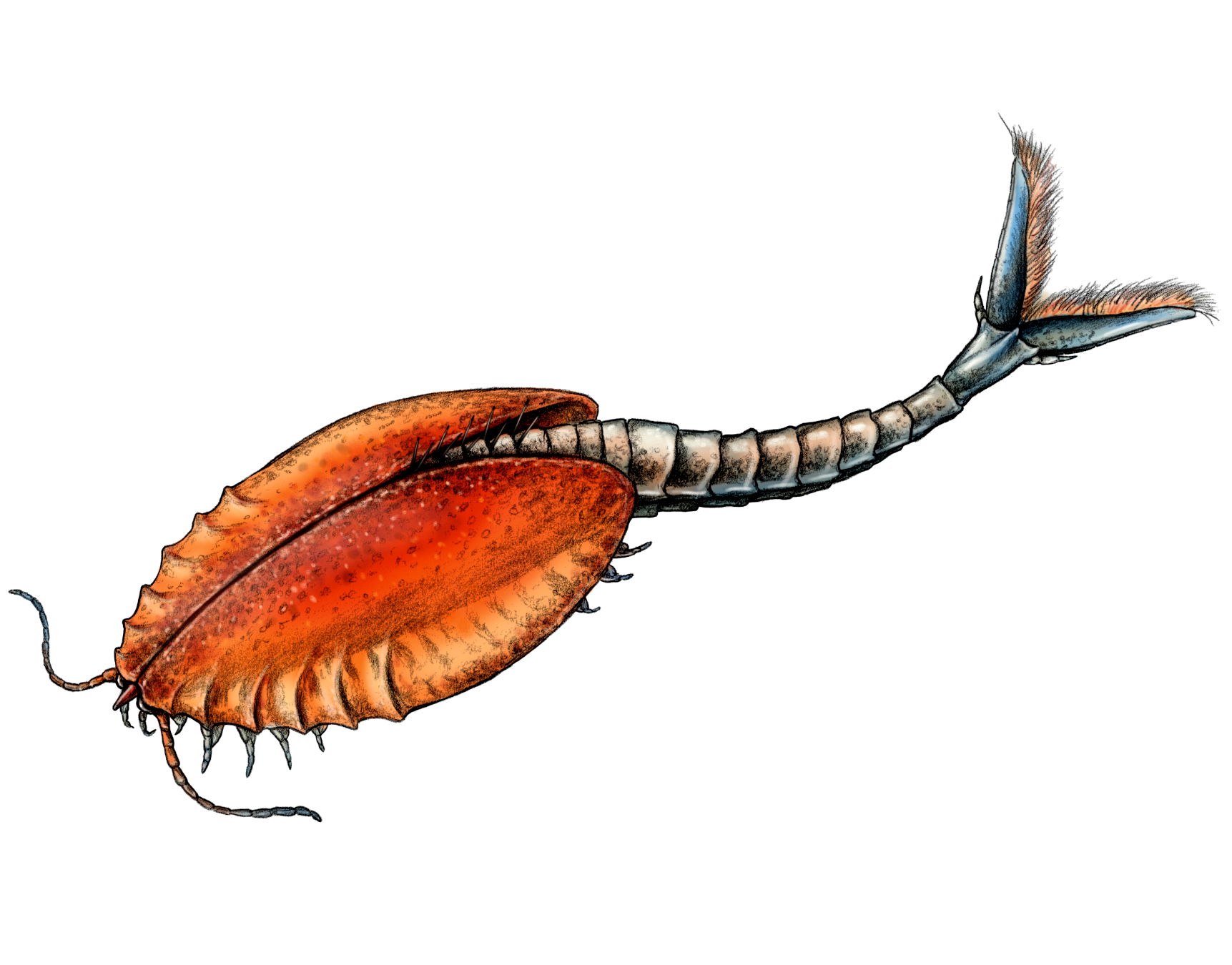
- Artist's restoration
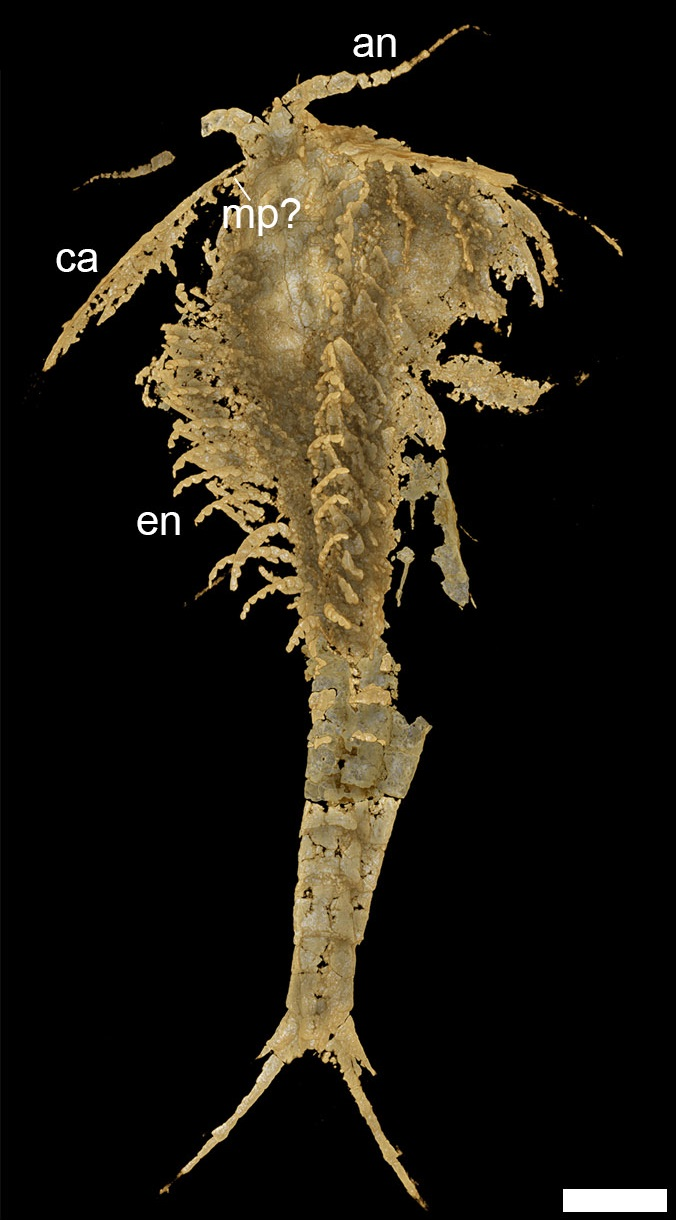
- Tomographically scanned specimen

Scientific classification
- Kingdom: Animalia
- Phylum: Arthropoda
- Order: †Hymenocarina
- Genus: †Ercaicunia; Luo & Hu, 1999
- Species: †E. multinodosa

Binomial name
- †Ercaicunia multinodosa Luo & Hu, 1999

= Ercaicunia =

Ercaicunia Temporal range: Early Cambrian–Mid Cambrian

Extinct genus of arthropods

Ercaicunia is genus of bivalved Cambrian arthropod from the Chengjiang biota of Yunnan, China. It contains a single species, Ercaicunia multinodosa that was described by Luo et al. in 1999. The total length of the body ranges from 8 to 11 millimetres (0.31 to 0.43 in). The bivalved carapace covered about a third of the total body-length, and has up to six serrations on its forward edge. The head has a pair of large uniramous antennae, as well as a smaller pair of secondary antennae, as well as pair of mandibles and maxillae. The trunk has 16 pairs of biramous appendages. Specimens were CT scanned in 2019, which suggested it to be a stem-group crustacean. Other subsequent studies have recovered it as a member of Hymenocarina, which contains other bivalved Cambrian arthropods.
