= Mandible (arthropod mouthpart) =

Pair of mouthparts used either for biting or cutting and holding food

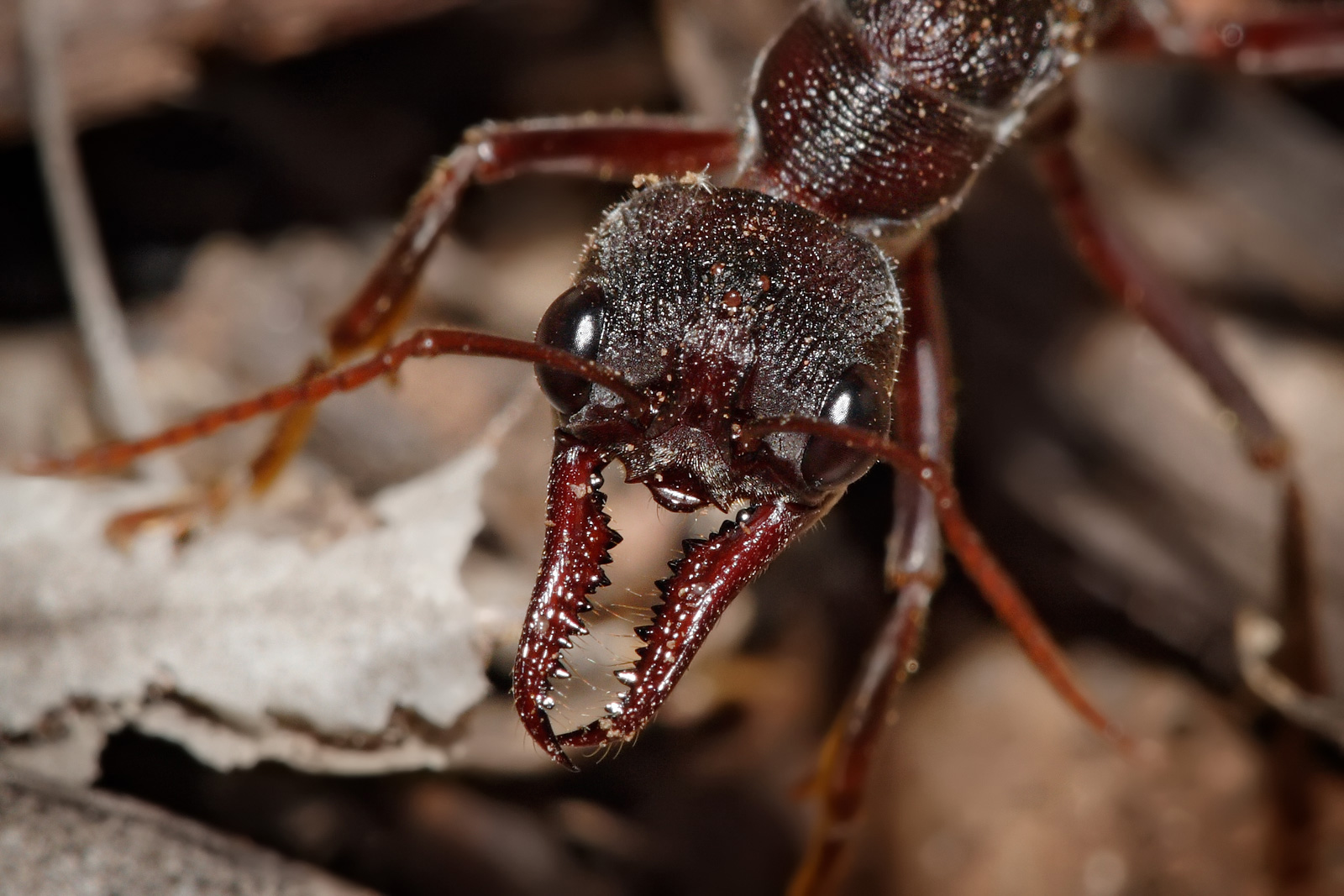
The mandibles of a bull ant

The mandible (from Latin: mandibula or mandĭbŭ-lum, a jaw) of an arthropod is a pair of mouthparts used either for biting or cutting and holding food. Mandibles are often simply called jaws. Mandibles are present in the extant subphyla Myriapoda (millipedes and others), Crustacea and Hexapoda (insects etc.). These groups make up the clade Mandibulata and comprise all living arthropods except arachnids and other chelicerates. Unlike chelicerae, mandibles are often used to chew food.

Amphipod mandible diagram. 1. Molar process; 2. Spine row; 3. Lacinia mobilis; 4. Incisor process; 5. Palp

== Insects ==
Insect mandibles are as diverse in form as their food. For instance, grasshoppers and many other plant-eating insects have sharp-edged mandibles that move side to side. Most butterflies and moths lack mandibles as they mainly feed on nectar from flowers.

Queen bees have mandibles with sharp cutting teeth unlike worker bees, who have toothless jaws. Male dobsonflies have slender mandibles up to 2.5 cm long, half as long as the insect's main body. Potter wasps use their mandibles to mix droplets of water with clay while constructing a nest.

=== Ants ===
Ants have long, broad, serrated jaws, used for digging, collecting food, fighting and cutting, and are probably the most important work tool ants possess. Ants typically bite each other when fighting. Some ants use mandibles to injure the enemy and squirt poison into the wound. Harvester ants use their mandibles to collect and carry seeds. Army ants have sharp mandibles that are better adapted for fighting than obtaining food or nursing the larvae. Carpenter ants make their nests in various wooden structures, which they hollow out with their sharp mandibles.

=== Beetles ===
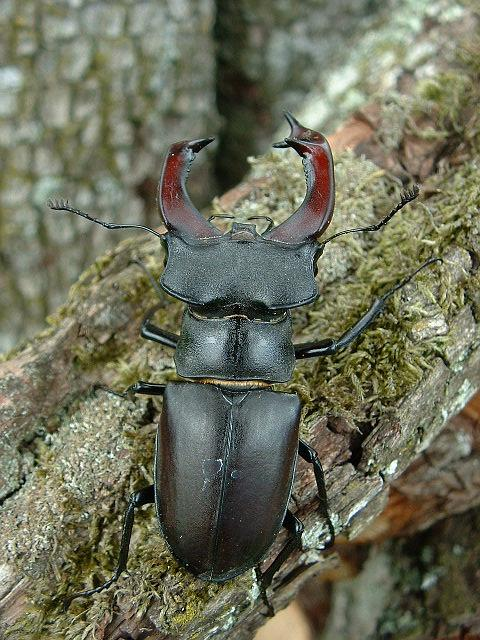
Stag beetle with mandibles modified no longer used in feeding

The shape and size of beetle mandibles varies from species to species depending on the food preferences. For example, carnivorous beetles have extended mandibles to seize or crush prey. Tiger beetles' mandibles (similar to the piercing canine teeth of tigers) are well adapted for killing prey. Diving beetle and firefly larvae have hollow mandibles, which can inject digestive fluid to liquefy the tissues of the prey. When this process is over, they suck the digested tissue through the mandibles.

The antlerlike jaws of stag beetles are essentially their namesake trait. In some tropical species they can be up to 10 cm, as long as the body of the beetle. These mandibles are primarily used in combat.

=== Butterflies and moths ===
Caterpillars use sharp mandibles to cut leaves in side-to-side motions. Only a few moths have functional mandibles in the adult stage. The most notable example are members of the family Micropterigidae, small moths with toothed mandibles used for chewing pollen grains, lacking even the most rudimentary proboscis.

== Myriapods ==
Among myriapods, centipedes have strong, bristly mandibles, which have a row of teeth in all centipedes except for members of the order Geophilomorpha. Millipedes have small mandibles, their only functioning mouthparts, as the maxillae are fused to the lower lip (labium).

== Crustaceans ==
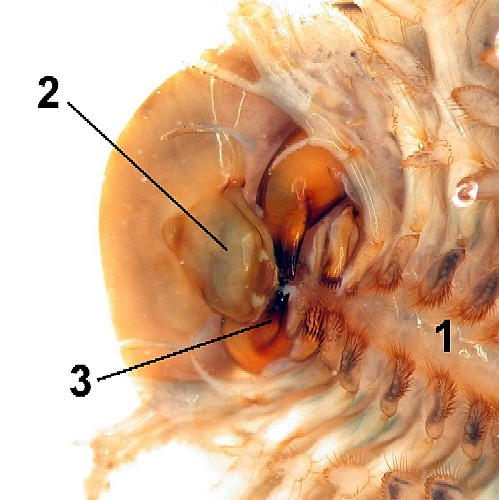
Head of a tadpole shrimp, with the mandibles labeled 3

Crustaceans have a pair of mandibles that typically consist of an enlarged basal segment (coxa) and a palp (sensory feeler) consisting of all other segments. In some groups, such as the Branchiopoda, the palp is reduced or absent. Crustacean mandibles may be equipped with special teeth (molar and incisor processes).

== See also ==
- Mandibulata
