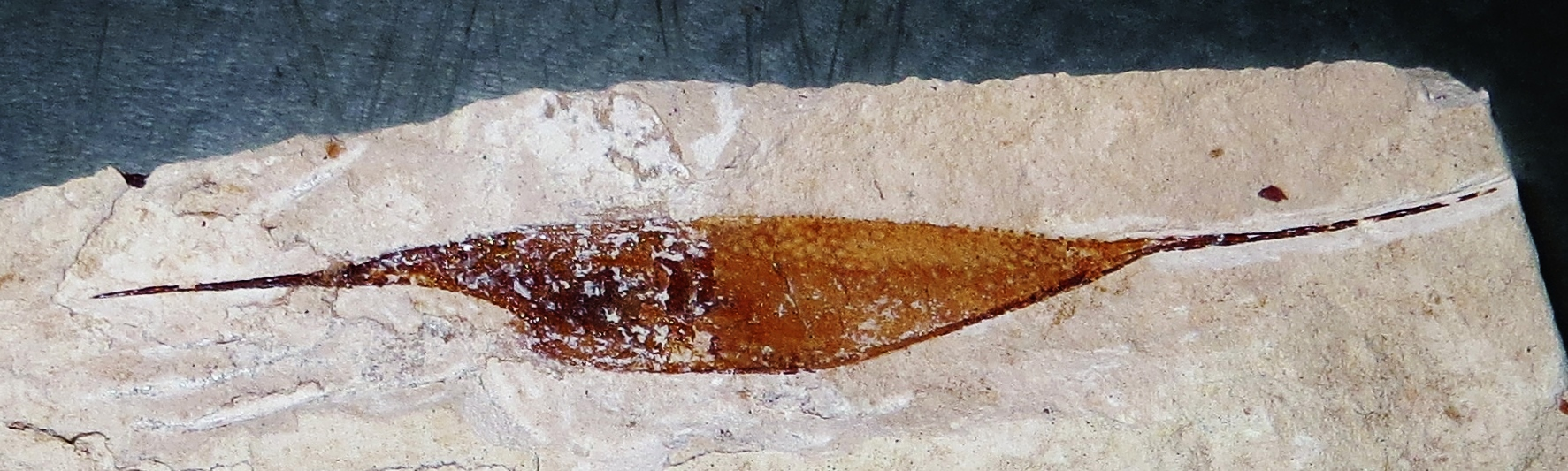
- A specimen of Protozoea hilgendorfi at the Museo Civico di Storia Naturale di Milano.

Scientific classification
- Kingdom: Animalia
- Phylum: Arthropoda
- Class: †Thylacocephala
- Genus: †Protozoea; Dames, 1886

Type species
- Protozoea hilgendorfi

Species
- †P. hilgendorfi Dames, 1886

= Protozoea =

Protozoea Temporal range: Late Santonian 85–84 Ma

Extinct genus of arthropods

Protozoea (originally Protozoëa, from ancient Greek πρωτο- meaning "first" and Neolatin zoëa, the larval stage of some decapod crustaceans) is an extinct genus of thylacocephalan arthropod that lived during the Cretaceous Period. Fossils have been found in the Santonian Sahel Alma Lagerstätte in Lebanon. This genus, along with the contemporary Thylacocephalus, Pseuderichtus, Keelicaris, and Hamaticaris are the latest known record of this group. The genus currently is known only from one species: P. hilgendorfi. A second, P. damesi, was named before being transferred to the new genus, Hamaticaris.

== Description ==
=== Carapace ===
The carapace of Protozoea, and other members of Protozoeidae, is more elongated than in other Thylacocephalans, however, the ratio between the carapace length and depth vary significantly from specimen to specimen. The most notable feature of the carapace are the two long spines on either end of the animal, with the rear one curving upward. Sylvain et al., compared these spines to other extant crustaceans, hypothesizing that these structures would help the animal be more buoyant and hydrodynamic. The carapace of the animal was covered in many small, alternating pits. In life the carapace of Protozoea would have been made of two halves, connecting along the dorsal midline of the animal. several specimens preserve series of seven small barbs on the posterior portion of the carapace's underside.
The carapace length varied between roughly 2.5 to 8 centimetres (0.98 to 3.15 in) This was hypothesized to be either due to ontogeny, sexual dimorphism, or environmental change. The variability was not able to be explained through taphonomy, and instead was an alteration of the soft, flexible carapace. The carapace was decorated in "numerous, small circular pits." On the rostral and dorsal end of the carapace, there are 2 spines that project outwards. Micro "tube-like" structures on the carapace, similar to the organule canals on modern crustaceans, may indicate a nektonic or nectobenthic lifestyle. Moreover, the carapace of Protozoea would have been relatively light and flexible, which would have aided in faster, more pelagic movements.

=== Appendages ===
Remains of the raptorial appendages are rare. In life, Protozoea would have three pairs of delicate limbs that would have been articulated with muscle fibers at the base of them underneath the carapace. Notably, only the distal parts of the forelimbs would be visible from outside the carapace: a feature not seen in other thylacocephalans. Behind the raptorial forelimbs, there is a series of small paddle-shaped limbs that would have aided the animal in swimming.

=== Internal Anatomy ===
Preserved within the carapace of Protozoea are various soft tissues, including the stomach, muscles, and 8 pairs of "baguette-shaped" gills. Several muscles are preserved, including those that would have controlled the stomach movements as well as those of the trunk limb.

== Paleoenvironment ==
During the Late Santonian the area that would become Sahel Alma was most likely deposited at depth below 150 metres (490 ft) in "chalky, laminated limestone." Many other animals were present within the site, including deep-water cartilaginous and bony fishes, cephalopods, and arthropods.

== Taxonomy ==
Below is the results of Schram, Hof, and Steeman (1999). They noted these results are tentative.

- Thylacocephala
  - - Concavicaris sinuata
    - Concavicaris georgeorum
  - - Ostenocaris cypriformes
    - - - Concavicaris campi
        - Concavicaris playfordi
        - - Concavicaris glenisteri
          - - Concavicaris milesi
            - Harrycaris whittingtoni
      - - Mayrocaris bucculata
        - Convexicaris mazonensis
        - Protozoea
          - P. hilgendorfi
          - P. damesi = Hamaticaris
        - - Clausocaris lithographica
          - Clausocaris pinnai
        - - Kilianocaris lerichei
          - - Paraostenia voultensis
            - - Dollocaris ingens
              - Psuderichthus cretaceus

Below is the phylogeny of Thylacocephala as proposed by Schram (2014). ? indicates uncertain placement.

- Thylacocephala
  - Conchyliocarida
    - ?
      Unnamed Silurian Thylacocephala = Thylacares
    - - Ostenocarididae
        - Ostenocaris
        - ?
          Kilianocaris
      - Dollocarididae
        - Dollocaris
        - - Paraostenia
          - Mayrocaris
  - Concavicarida
    - - Concavicarididae
        - Harrycaris
        - Concavicaris spp.
        - Ankitokazocaris
      - Austriocarididae
        - Austriocaris
        - Yangzicaris
    - Microcarididae
      - Thylacocephalus
      - - Microcaris
        - Ferrecaris
        - Atropicaris
    - - Protozoeidae
        - Protozoea
        - Pseuderichthus
      - Clausocarididae
        - Clausocaris
        - Convexicaris
