= La Voulte-sur-Rhône (lagerstätte) =

Lagerstätte in southwestern France

- Stratigraphic range: Callovian; ~165 Ma
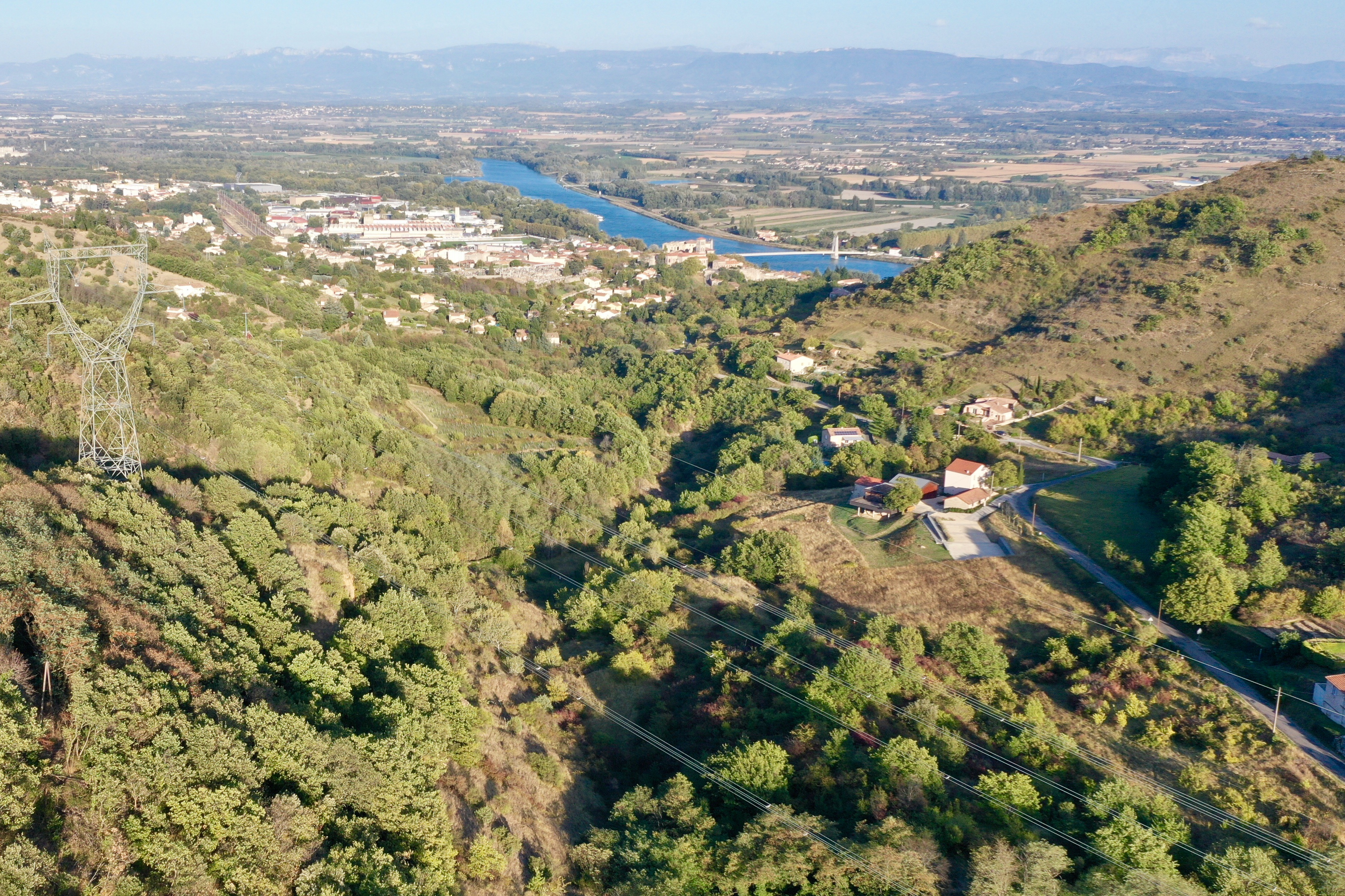
- The mines ravine of the Voulte lagerstätte.
- Type: Geological formation
- Thickness: about 100 m (330 ft)

Lithology
- Primary: Claystones and marls
- Other: ferruginous limestone

Location
- Coordinates: 44°47′58.3″N 4°46′42.4″E
- Region: Rhône-Alpes, Ardèche department
- Country: France
- Extent: Several historically active commercial quarries

Type section
- Named for: La Voulte-sur-Rhône, a nearby town

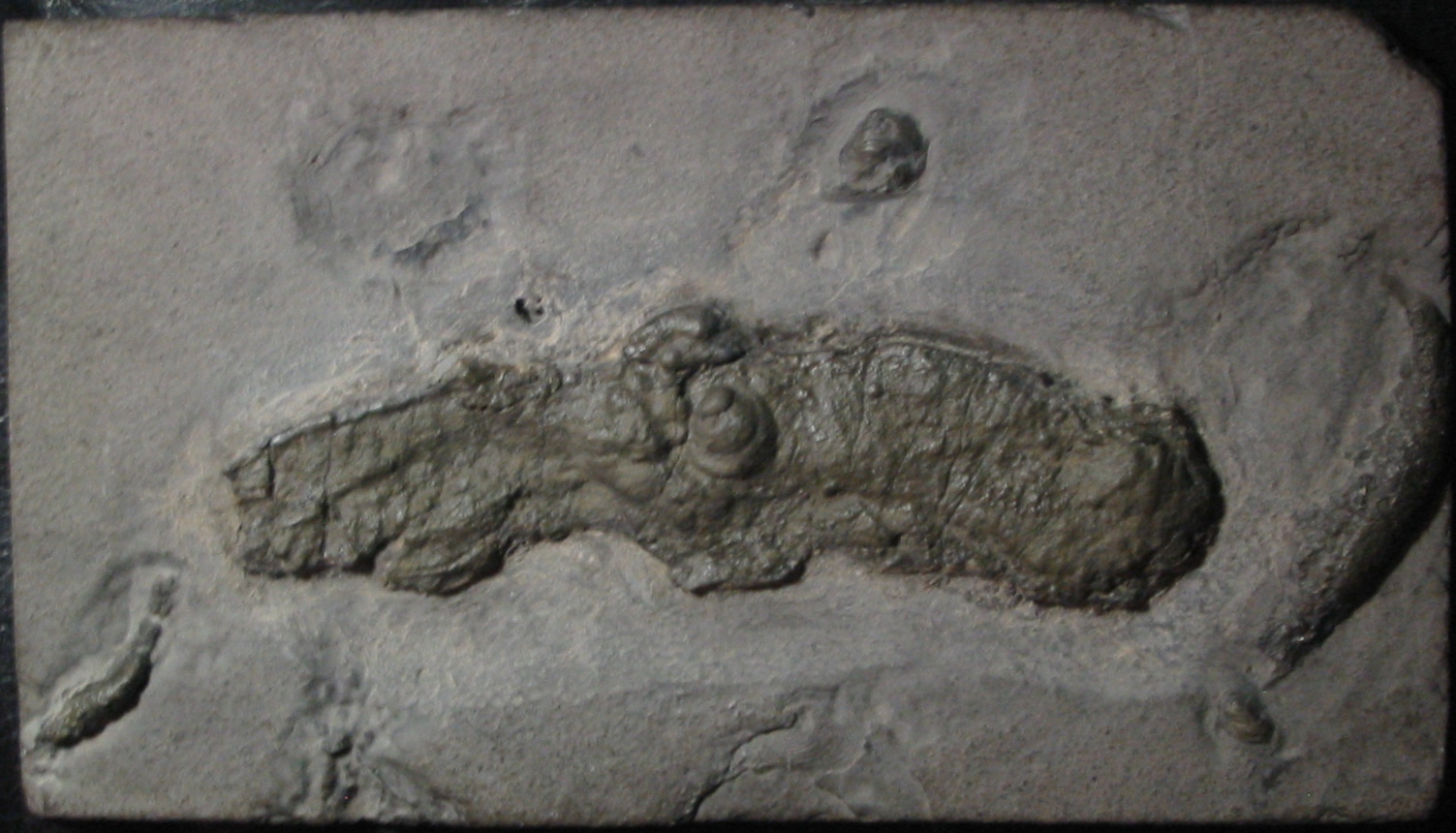
Pyritized fossil of Vampyronassa rhodanica from La Voulte-sur-Rhône

The late Middle Jurassic lagerstätte at La Voulte-sur-Rhône, in the Ardèche region of southwestern France, offers paleontologists an outstanding view of an undisturbed paleoecosystem that was preserved in fine detail as organisms died at the site and settled to the bottom of a shallow epicontinental sea, with a folded floor that in places exceeded 200 m at this site. The site preserves a marine system of the Lower Callovian stage, a little over 160 mya. The sequence is exposed in a series of quarries at La Boissine, west of the village of La Voulte-sur-Rhône. Iron pyrites in the silty shale are symptoms of an anoxic environment. The site was recognized among French paleontologists from the mid-nineteenth century for its finely detailed fossils.

== Preservation ==
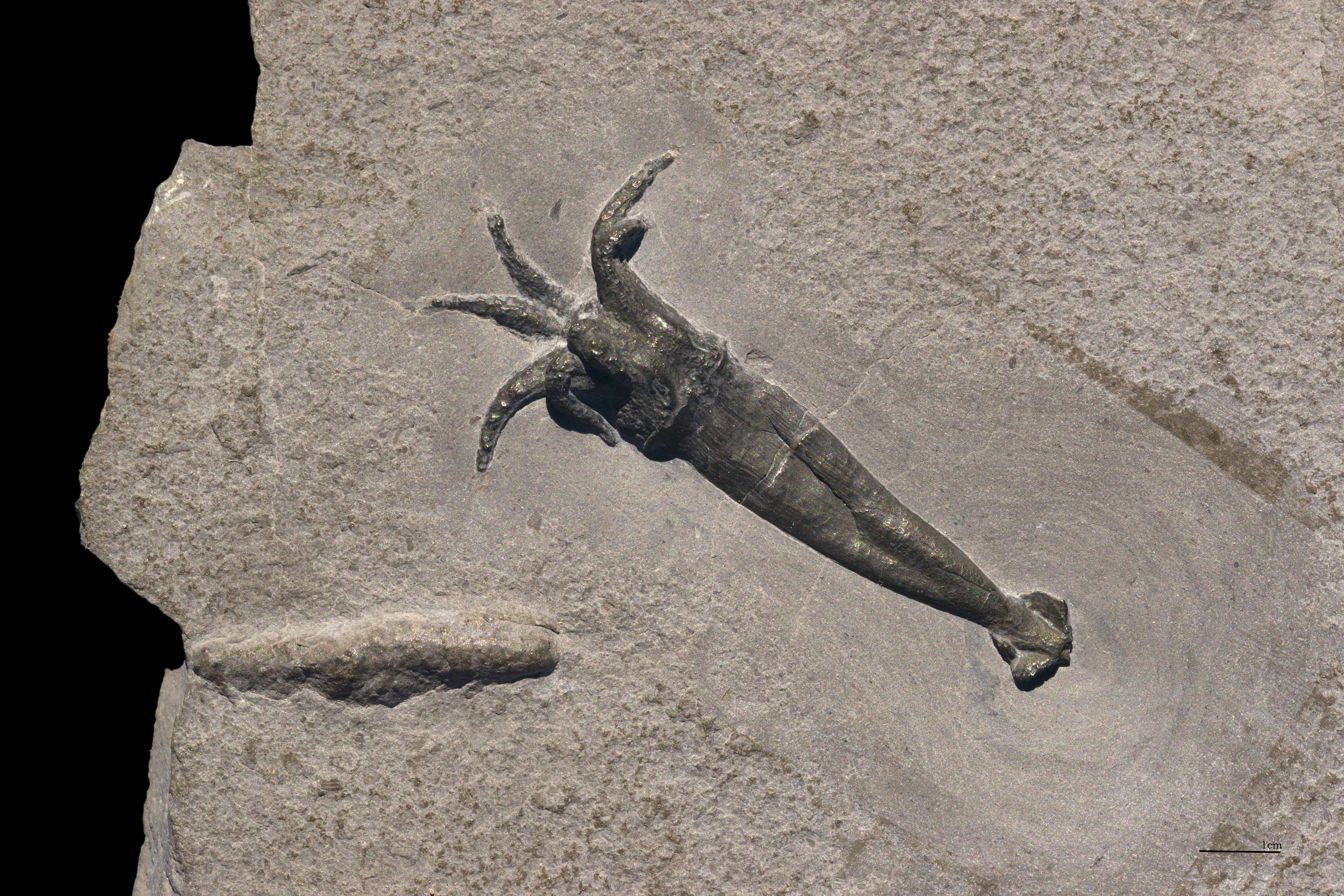
Rhomboteuthis lehmani from La Voulte-sur-Rhône

Some soft parts of organisms are preserved as phosphatised concretions, in exceptional cases down to cellular details, e.g. retinal structures in the eyes of conchyliocarid crustacea. Apart from Beecher's Trilobite Bed and the Hunsrück Slate, La Voulte-sur-Rhône is the only other locality where extensive pyritization of soft parts occurs. However, pyritisation is not the only preservation pathway; several stages of mineralization (originally phosphate followed by calcite or gypsum, then pyrite and finally galena) are seen, each successive mineralization event degrades the detail preserved, with only gross morphological features preserved in the most advanced stages.

== Fauna and flora ==
The fauna preserved can be broadly divided into the allochthonous fauna (consisting of soft-bodied organisms which lived on the sea floor (benthic) or swam freely just above it (nektobenthic)) and the in-situ mortality horizon.

The allochthonous fauna contains rare and well-preserved organisms. Fossils of pycnogonids ("sea-spiders"), the first find in Mesozoic strata in an admittedly very patchy fossil record, were identified in 2007. A coleoid cephalopod (a single specimen of a small octopus) was described from La Voulte-sur-Rhône in 1982. The marine crocodile Metriorhynchus, fish, decapod, mysid crustaceans, thylacocephalans, crinoids, and ophiuroids (most commonly Ophiopinna elegans) are also to be found.

The in situ mortality horizon consists of abundant pavements of the bivalve Bositra buchi and trace fossils of suspected worm burrows.

Two specimens of plants suggest that a shoreline was not far distant, represented today by France's Massif Central.

=== Paleobiota ===
Color key: Taxon / Reclassified taxon / Taxon falsely reported as present / Dubious taxon or junior synonym / Ichnotaxon / Ootaxon / Morphotaxon	Notes; Uncertain or tentative taxa are in small text; ~~crossed out~~ taxa are discredited.

Invertebrates
Genus	Species	Higher taxon	Notes	Images
Vampyronassa	V. rhodanica	Vampyroteuthidae	Relatively similar to modern vampire squid, but an active predator instead of a detritivore	Life reconstruction of V. rhodanica
Vampyrofugiens	V. atramentum	Vampyromorphida	Has both ink and bioluminescent organs	
Proteroctopus	P. ribeti	Vampyropoda	Originally interpreted as a basal octopus, hence the name	Holotype of Proteroctopus
Rhomboteuthis	R. lehmani	Plesioteuthididae	Has a preserved ink sac	Fossil of Rhomboteuthis
Romaniteuthis	R. gevreyi	Plesioteuthididae	Relatively similar to Plesioteuthis	
Gramadella	G. piveteaui	Myopsida	One of the oldest "true" squid known	
Mastigophora	M. brevipennis	Loligosepiina (Vampyromorpha)	May bear a pair of elongate tentacles, however these may be from associated Belemnotheutis fossils?	
Iubarenicola	I. fischeri	Capitellida	Unclear family	
Paleoaphrodite	P. gallica, P. briggsiana, P. adeliae	Aphroditidae	One of the earliest scaleworm fossils known	
Protopholoe	P. rhodanitis	Aphroditoidea	Uncertain family	
Rhondeletia	R. scutata	Sipuncula	One of the only Mesozoic sipunculan fossils	
Megaderaion	M. callovianum	Enteropneusta	Also known from Osteno	
Rhodanicaris	R. depereti	Penaeidae		
Aeger	A. brevirostris	Aegeridae	One of the most common crustaceans from La Voulte	Reconstruction of A. brevirostris
Mandocaris	M. polyphaga	Acanthephyridae		
Archeosolenocera	A. straeleni	Solenoceridae	Synonymous with Antrimpos secretaniae	Reconstruction of A. straeleni
Stenochirus	S. vahldieki	Stenochiridae	The oldest record of the genus	Drawings of fossils of the two Stenochirus species from Solnhofen
Glypheopsis	G. voultensis	Glypheidae		
Eryma	E. ventrosum, E. cumonti, E. mandelslohi	Erymidae	Excellent preservation has shown almost all of its internal organs	Fossil of E. leptodactylina from Solnhofen
Voulteryon	V. parvulus	Eryonidae	May have been transported from shallow waters as evidenced by its eye structure	V. parvulus fossil
Eryon	E. ellipticus	Eryonidae	Formerly used for all polychelid fossils	E. cuvieri from Solnhofen
Cycleryon	C. romani	Eryonidae	Very similar to Eryon itself	C. propinquus from Solnhofen
Proeryon	P. giganteus, P. charbonnieri	Coleiidae	Formerly placed in Cycleryon	P. hartmanni fossil (from Solnhofen?)
Willemoesiocaris	W. ovalis	Coleiidae		W. ovalis fossil
Hellerocaris	H. falloti	Polychelidae	Closely related to modern polychelids	H. falloti fossil
Adamanteryon	A. fourneti	Polychelida	Uncertain family	
Eucopia	E. praecursor	Eucopiidae	One of the earliest lophogastrid fossils known	
Lophogaster	L. voultensis	Lophogastridae	One of the earliest lophogastrid fossils known	
Palaeocuma	P. hessi	Cumacea	Earliest crown-cumacean fossil known	
Siriella	S. antiqua, S. carinata	Mysidae	Extant genus	Drawing of S. vulgaris
Udora	U. gevreyi, U. minuta	Procarididea		U. brevispina from Solnhofen
Palaeopycnogonides	P. gracilis	Palaeopycnogonididae (Pycnogonida)	Has a relatively unusual arrangement of head appendages	
Colossopantopus	C. boissinensis	Colossendeidae	A large pycnogonid with a very long proboscis	
Palaeoendeis	P. elmii	Endeidae (Pycnogonida)	Vaguely similar to Haliestes?	
Ostenocaris	O. ribeti	Thylacocephala	Formerly classified as Clausocaris ribeti, much smaller than the type species of Ostenocaris	Reconstruction of O. ribeti
Mayrocaris	M. sp	Thylacocephala	Previously known from Solnhofen	Specimen of M. bucculata (from Solnhofen?)
Dollocaris	D. ingens	Thylacocephala	One of the largest thylacocephalans	Reconstruction of Dollocaris
Paraostenia	P. voultensis	Thylacocephala	Also known from the Triassic	Reconstruction of Paraostenia
Austriocaris	A. secretanae	Thylacocephala	Formerly classified under Dollocaris	Reconstruction of A. secretanae
Kilianicaris	K. lerichei	Thylacocephala		Reconstruction of Kilianicaris
Paraclausocaris	P. harpi	Thylacocephala	Relatively similar to Clausocaris itself except for the carapace margin	Reconstruction of Clausocaris lithographica, a close relative
Terminaster	T. cancriformis	Forcipulatacea	Known from other localities across Europe	Fossil of T. cancriformis from Solnhofen
Decacuminaster	D. solaris	Valvatida	Name translates to "pollarded star", as the top seems to have been "cut off" like a pollarded tree	
Rhodanometra	R. lorioli	Pterocomidae (Comatulida)	One of the few complete crinoids known from La Voulte	
