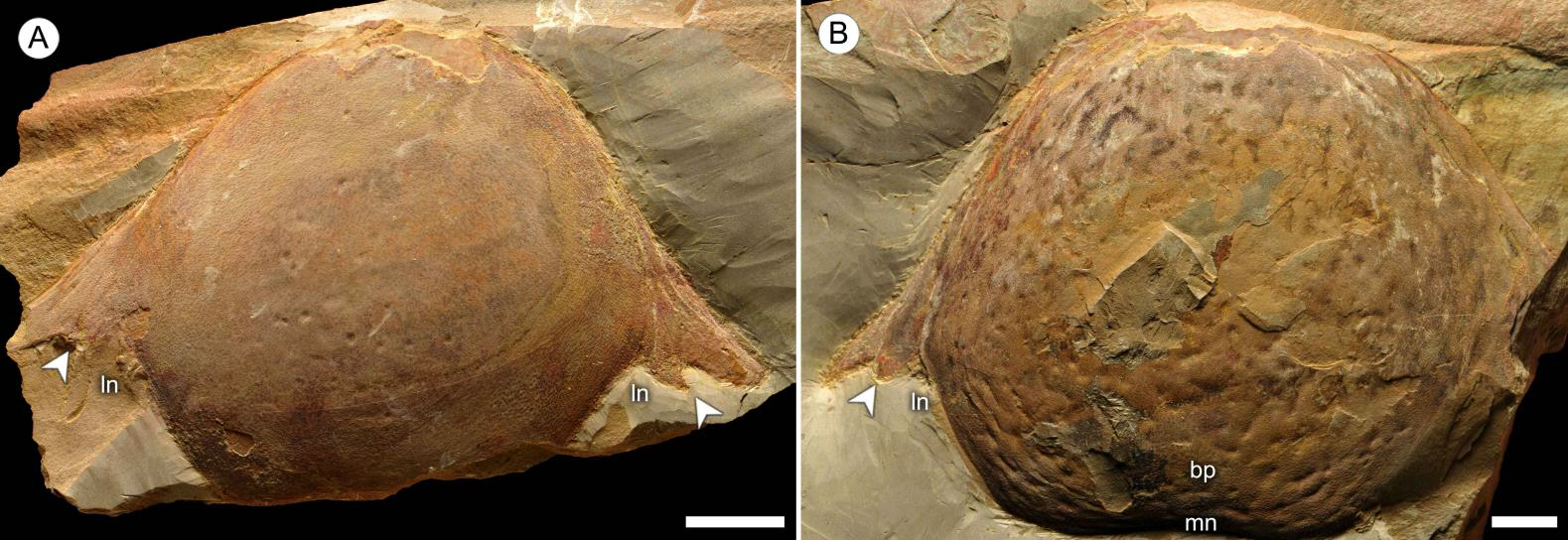
- Fossils of Zhenghecaris
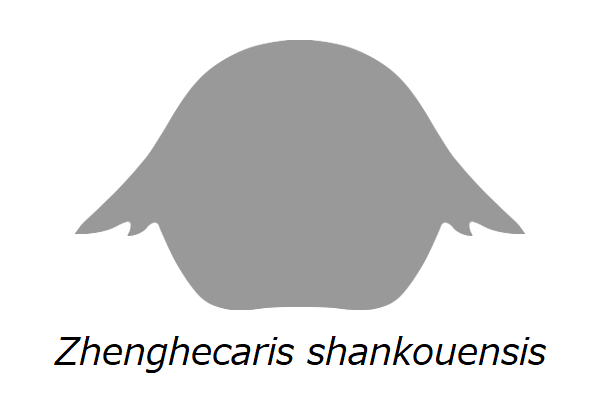
- Reconstruction of the Head sclerite of Zhenghecaris

Scientific classification
- Kingdom: Animalia
- Phylum: Arthropoda
- Class: incertae sedis
- Genus: †Zhenghecaris; Vannier et al., 2006
- Species: †Z. shankouensis

Binomial name
- †Zhenghecaris shankouensis Vannier et al., 2006

= Zhenghecaris =

Zhenghecaris Temporal range: Cambrian stage 3

Genus of enigmatic Cambrian arthropod

Zhenghecaris is an extinct genus of enigmatic arthropods from the Lower Cambrian Maotianshan Shales, tentatively classified as a hurdiid (peytoiid) radiodont, and originally as a thylacocephalan.

== Classification ==
The genus contains a single species, Zhenghecaris shankouensis, known from several specimens mostly preserving the carapace and eyes. These specimens measure roughly 15 cm (5.9 in) in width, which if interpreted as a thylacocephalan would make it one of the largest thylacocephalans, behind Ostenocaris, Dollocaris and Ainiktozoon, as well as the earliest since all other thylacocephalans found so far are Ordovician or younger. Better preserved fossils show that it was more similar to the domed sclerites of radiodonts such as Cambroraster, with two lateral spine processes on either side of the carapace, the eyes apparently fitting into the posterior notches but that has been disputed due to the fact that the assignment to Hurdiidae is largely based on Tauricornicaris, which is no longer interpreted as a radiodont but instead as the tergites of an arthropod of uncertain affinities. Additional isolated sclerites from the Chengjiang have been described as the lateral sclerites of Zhenghecaris due to their broad similarity to the P-elements of hurdiids (peytoiids), and because of their similar construction, ornamentation, and possession of two-pronged lateral spine processes. It has also been classified conservatively as Arthropoda incertae sedis, as the fragmentary remains cannot confidently be classified further due to the lack of associated appendages or trunk elements.

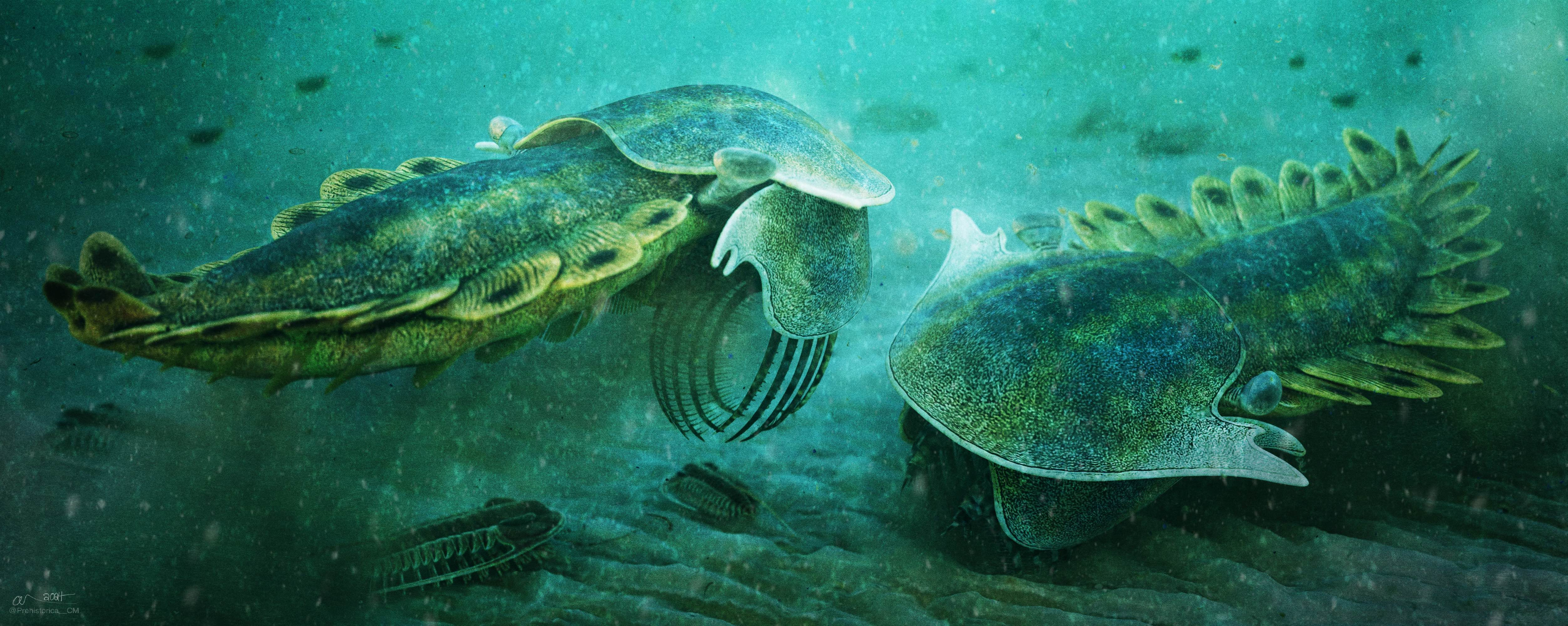
Speculative life restoration of Zhenghecaris as a hurdiid (peytoiid) radiodont, with missing anatomy based on Cambroraster

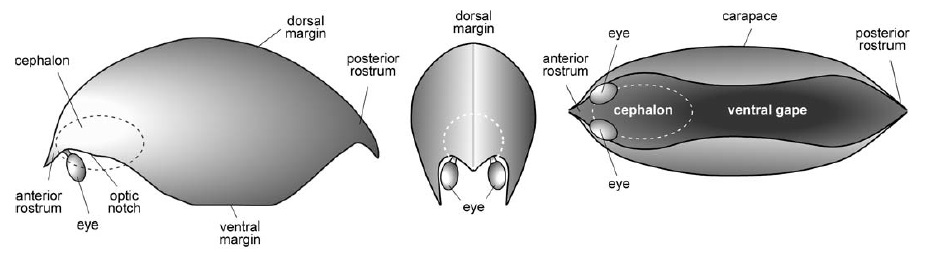
Outdated reconstruction as a thylacocephalan
