= Acanthephyra purpurea =

Scientific classification
- Kingdom: Animalia
- Phylum: Arthropoda
- Class: Malacostraca
- Order: Decapoda
- Suborder: Pleocyemata
- Infraorder: Caridea
- Family: Acanthephyridae
- Genus: Acanthephyra
- Species: A. purpurea

Binomial name
- Acanthephyra purpurea A. Milne-Edwards, 1881

Synonyms
- Acanthephyra abyssorum Filhol, 1885 (junior synonym); Acanthephyra parva paucidens Coutière, 1905; Hoplocaricyphus similis Coutière, 1907; Miersia agassizii Smith, 1882

Species of shrimp

Acanthephyra purpurea, sometimes called the fire-breathing shrimp, is a species of bioluminescent deep sea shrimp first described in 1881. The species is known for 'vomiting' bioluminescent fluid when distressed, although the fluid likely originates from the hepatopancreas and not the stomach.

A. purpurea expels large quantities of luminous fluid when distressed. When it is discharged into the water, luciferin contained in the fluid reacts with oxygen to produce luciferase and light. It is believed that this fluid is intended to confuse or distract predators. A. purpurea is one of several species of deep sea shrimp that are known to expel bioluminescent fluid, including Heterocarpus ensifer, Systellaspis debilis, and Oplophorus gracilorostris.

The species is mostly gonochoric. It engages in courtship displays through olfactory and tactile cues, and usually employs indirect sperm transfer.
