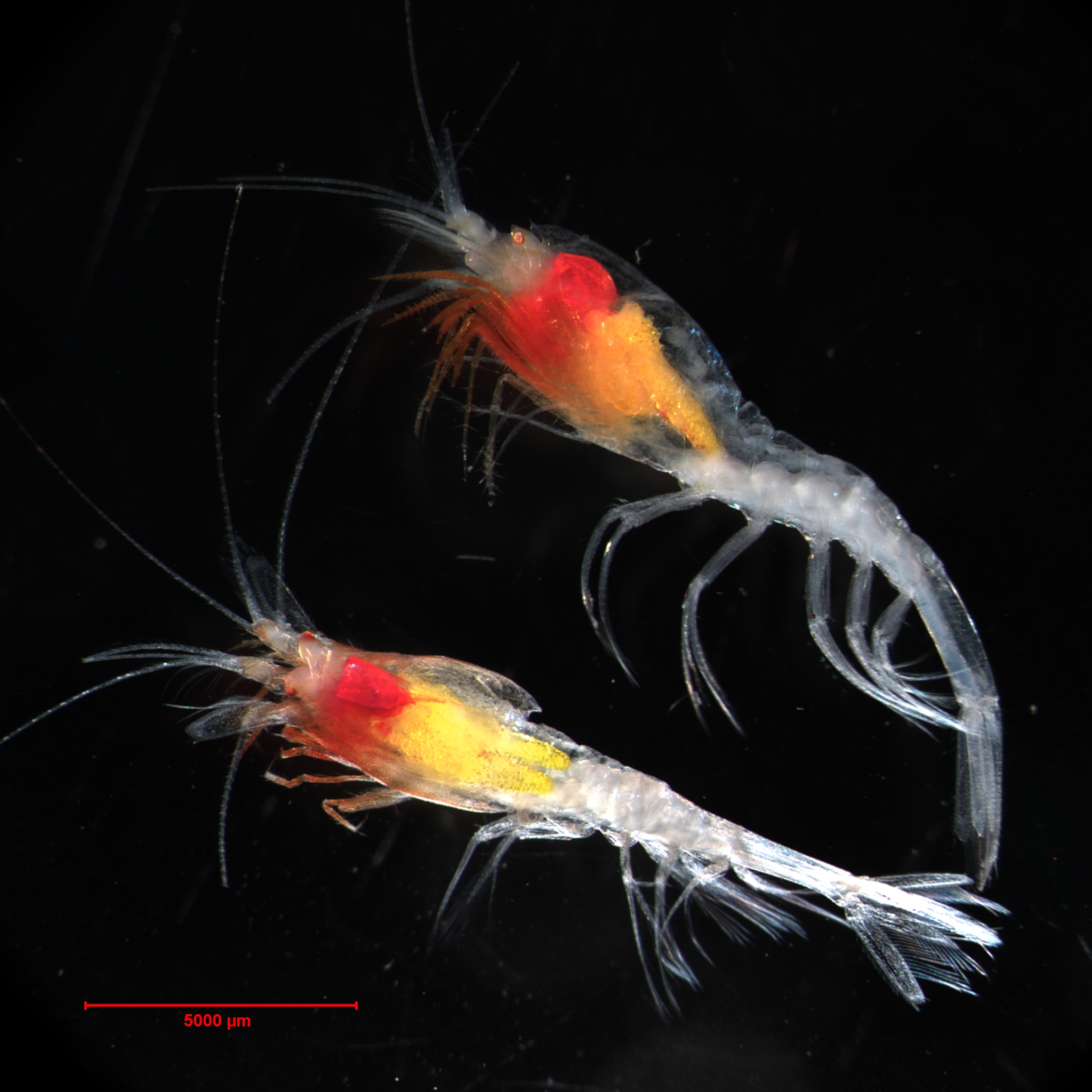
- Hymenodora glacialis

Scientific classification
- Kingdom: Animalia
- Phylum: Arthropoda
- Class: Malacostraca
- Order: Decapoda
- Suborder: Pleocyemata
- Infraorder: Caridea
- Family: Acanthephyridae
- Genus: Hymenodora; G. O. Sars, 1877

= Hymenodora =

Genus of crustaceans

Hymenodora is a genus of shrimp, containing four species, which collectively have a southern circumpolar distribution.

- Hymenodora acanthitelsonis Wasmer, 1972
- Hymenodora frontalis Rathbun, 1902
- Hymenodora glacialis (Buchholz, 1874)
- Hymenodora gracilis Smith, 1886
