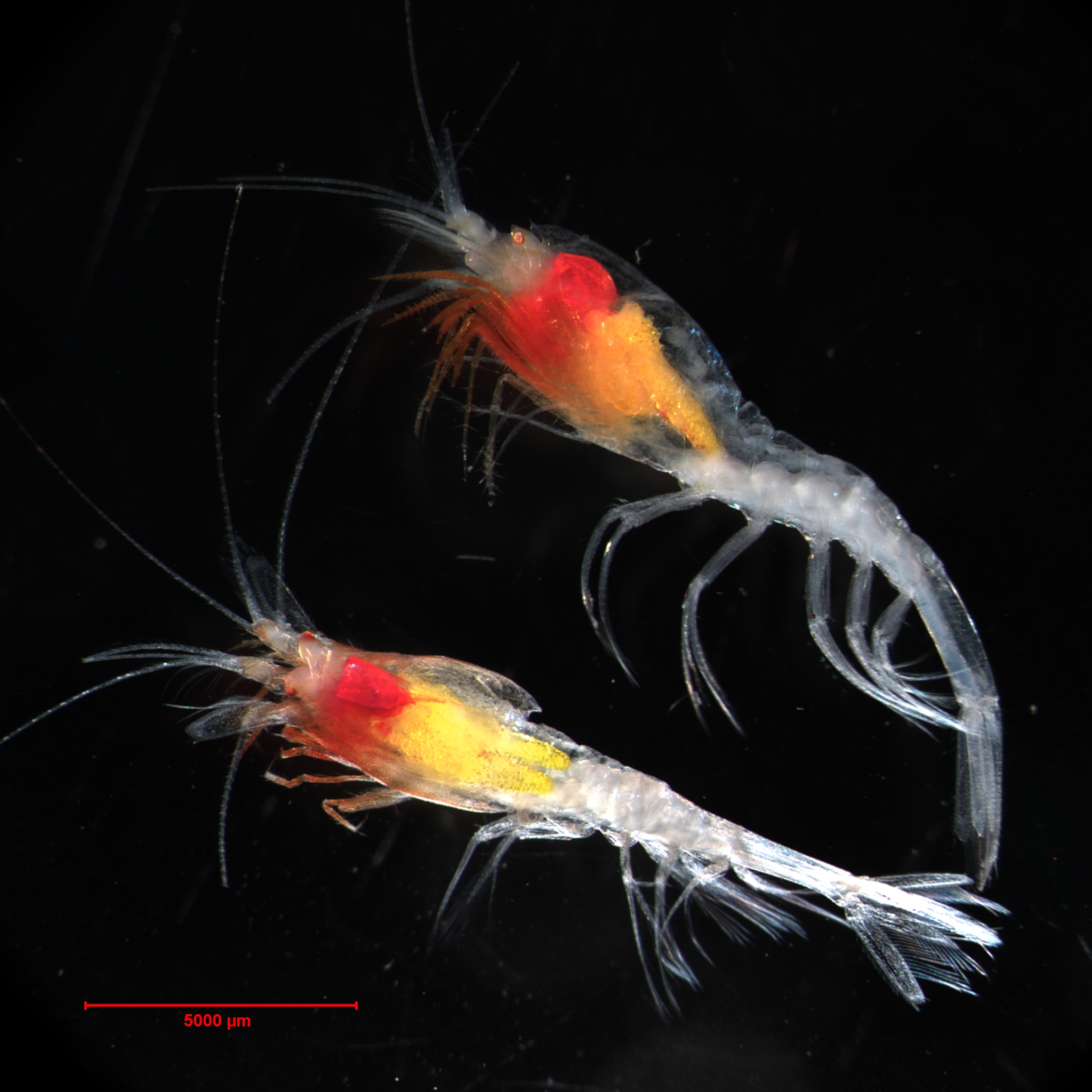

Scientific classification
- Kingdom: Animalia
- Phylum: Arthropoda
- Class: Malacostraca
- Order: Decapoda
- Suborder: Pleocyemata
- Infraorder: Caridea
- Family: Acanthephyridae
- Genus: Hymenodora
- Species: H. glacialis

Binomial name
- Hymenodora glacialis (Buchholz, 1874)

= Hymenodora glacialis =

Species of crustacean

Hymenodora glacialis, commonly known as the Northern deep-sea shrimp or the Northern ambereye, is a species of pelagic shrimp in the Acanthephyridae family. It is the only known species of pelagic shrimp to inhabit the Canada Basin.

H. glacialis was described in 1874 by Buchholz.
