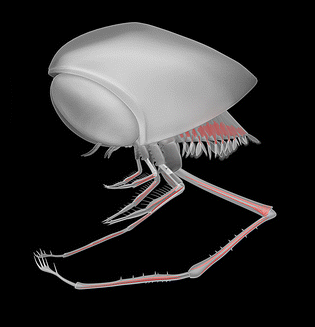
- Restoration of Clausocaris, a Concavicarida
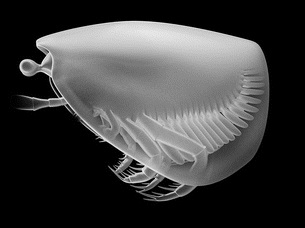
- Reconstruction of Thylacares, once considered to be the earliest known thylacocephalan

Scientific classification
- Kingdom: Animalia
- Phylum: Arthropoda
- Clade: Mandibulata
- Class: †Thylacocephala; Pinna et al., 1982

Orders
- Concavicarida; Conchyliocarida

= Thylacocephala =

Thylacocephala Temporal range: Late Ordovician (Sandbian) to Late Cretaceous (Santonian) (possible early Cambrian record)

Extinct group of arthropods

Thylacocephala (from the Greek θύλακος or thylakos, meaning "pouch", and κεφαλή or cephalon meaning "head") is an extinct group of mandibulate arthropods, that are generally regarded as a kind of crustacean, though their exact position within this group is uncertain. As a class they have a short research history, having been erected in the early 1980s.

They typically possess a large, laterally flattened carapace that encompasses the entire body. The compound eyes tend to be large and bulbous, and occupy a frontal notch on the carapace. They possess three pairs of large raptorial limbs, and the abdomen bears a battery of small swimming limbs. Their size ranges from ~15 mm to potentially up to 250 mm.

Inconclusive claims of thylacocephalans have been reported from the lower lower Cambrian (Zhenghecaris), but later study considered that genus as radiodont or arthropod with uncertain systematic position. The oldest unequivocal fossils are Upper Ordovician (Sandbian) in age, around 460-450 million years old. Thylacocephala survived at least until the Santonian stage of the Upper Cretaceous, around 84 million years ago.

Beyond this, there remains much uncertainty concerning fundamental aspects of the thylacocephalan anatomy, mode of life, and relationship to the Crustacea, with whom they have always been cautiously aligned.

== Research history ==
The Thylacocephala is only recently described as a class, yet species now included within the group were first described at the turn of the century. These were typically assigned to the phyllocarids despite an apparent lack of abdomen and appendages. In 1982/83, three research groups independently created higher taxa to accommodate new species. Based on a specimen from northern Italy, Pinna et al. designated a new class, Thylacocephala, while Secrétan – studying Dollocaris ingens, a species from the La Voulte-sur-Rhône konservat-lagerstätte in France – erected the class Conchyliocarida. Briggs & Rolfe, working on fossils from Australia's Devonian deposits were unable to attribute certain specimens to a known group, and created an order of uncertain affinities, the Concavicarida, to accommodate them. It was apparent the three groups were in fact working on a single major taxon (Rolfe noted disagreements over interpretation and taxonomic placement largely resulted from a disparity of sizes and differences in preservation.) The group took the name Thylacocephala by priority, with Concavicarida and Conchyliocarida subjugated to orders, erected by Rolfe, and modified by Schram.

== Taxonomy ==
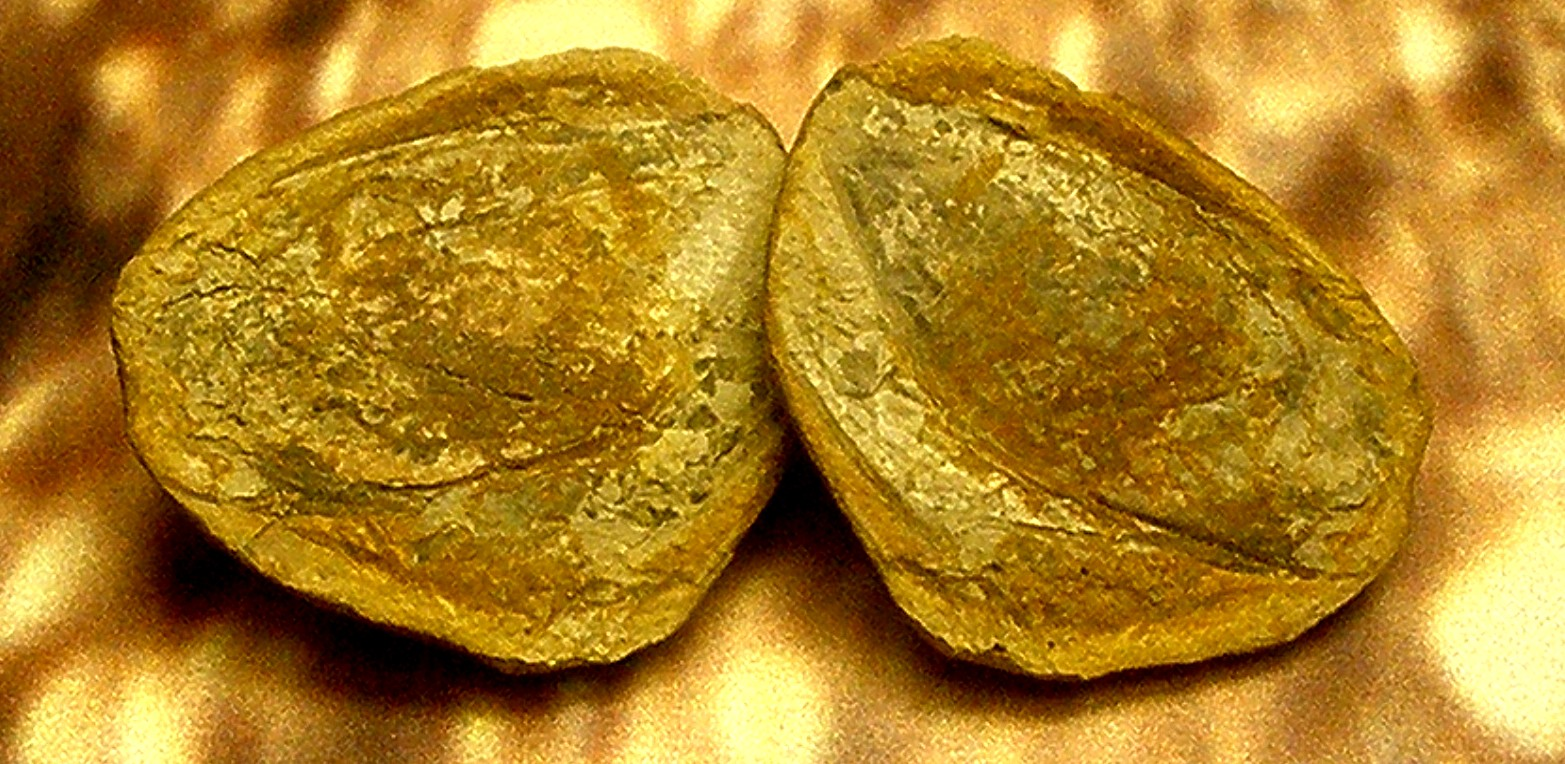
Ankitokazocaris fossil (Triassic)

Researchers agree the Thylacocephala represent a class. Some efforts have been made at further classification: Schram split currently known taxa into two orders:

- Concavicarida Briggs & Rolfe, 1983 which possesses:
  - A large, well developed optic notch
  - A discrete compound eye
  - A fused rostrum
  - 8 to 16 homologous well-demarcated trunk segments diminishing in height anteriorly and posteriorly
  - Order includes Ainiktozoon (Silurian), Harrycaris (Devonian), Concavicaris (Devonian to Carboniferous), Dollocaris (Jurassic).
- Conchyliocarida Secrétan, 1983:
  - Lacks an optic notch
  - Eyes on a protruding sac-like cephalon
  - No rostrum.
  - Order includes Convexicaris (Carboniferous), Yangzicaris (Triassic), and Atropicaris, Austriocaris, Clausocaris, Kilianocaris, Ostenocaris, and Paraostenia from the Jurassic.

The accuracy of this scheme has been questioned in recent papers, as it stresses differences in the eyes and exoskeletal structure, which – in modern arthropods – tend to be a response to environmental conditions. Thus it has been suggested these features are too strongly controlled by external factors to be used alone to distinguish higher taxa. The problem is exacerbated by the limited number of thylacocephalan species known. More reliable anatomical indicators would include segmentation and appendage attachments (requiring the internal anatomy, currently elusive as a result of the carapace).

== Genera ==
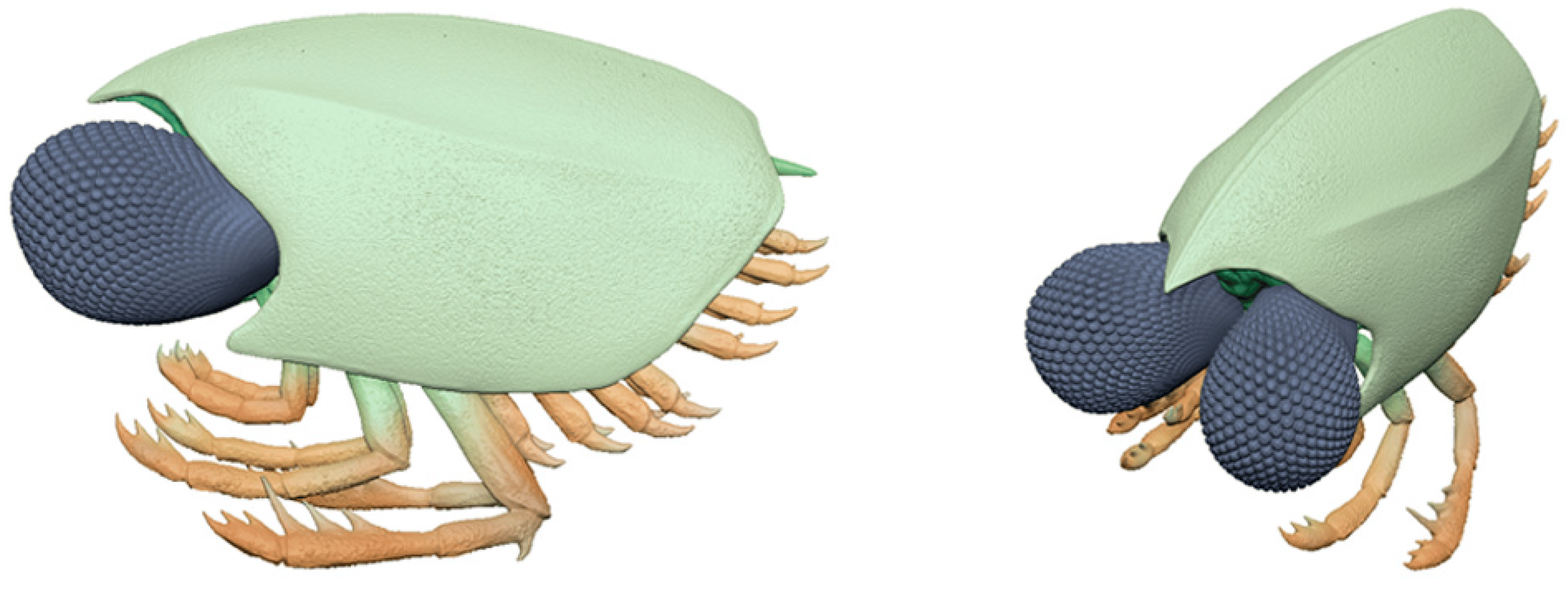
Ankitokazocaris lariensis

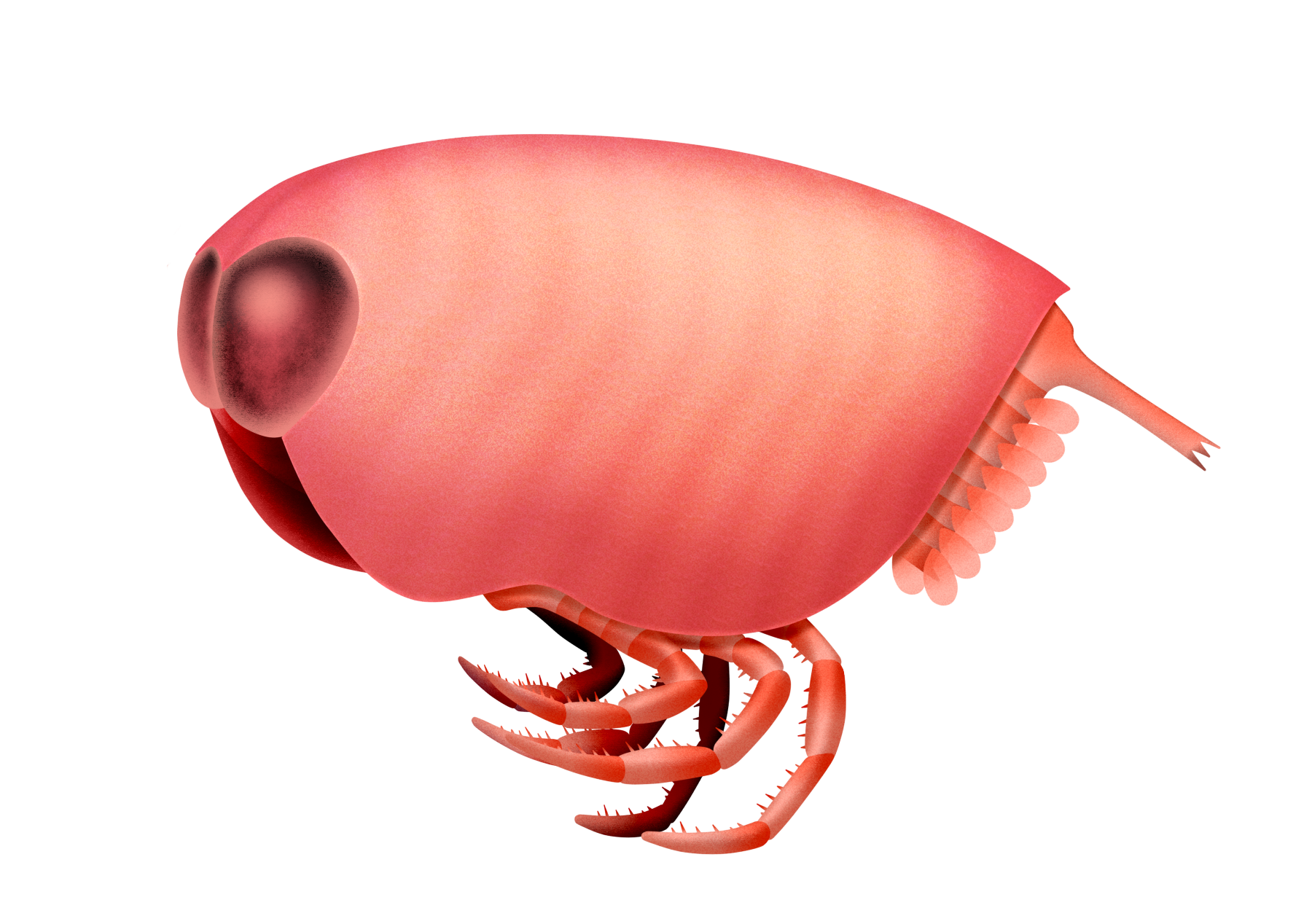
Concavicaris georgeorum

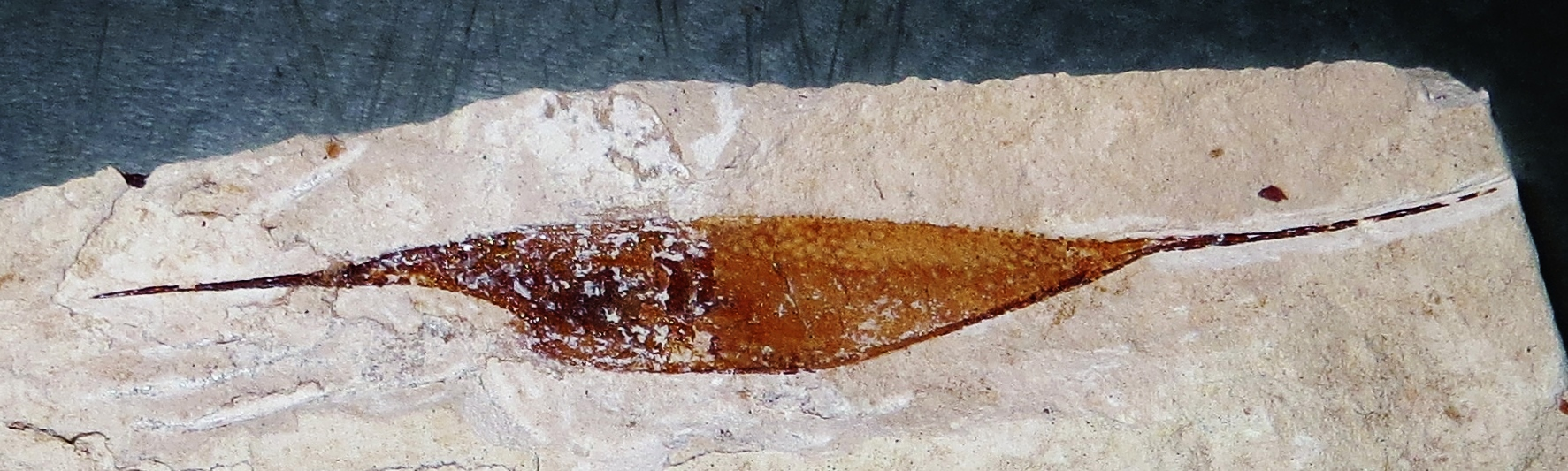
Protozoea hilgendorfi

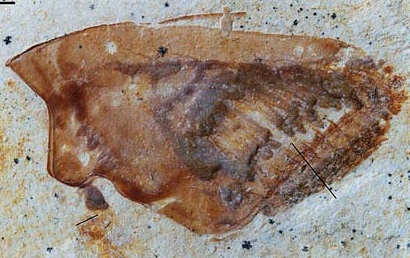
Mayrocaris bucculata

Class: Thylacocephala

- Ainiktozoon
- Ankitokazocaris
- Eodollocaris
- Falcatacaris
- Ligulacaris
- Paraostenia
- Ovalicaris
- Polzia
- Rotundaparma
- Rugocaris
- Silesicaris
- Stoppanicaris
- Thylacares
- Triangulusinus
- Victoriacaris
- Zazrivacaris
- Pseudoprotozoea
- Bohemiacaris
- Order Concavicarida
  - Quadrangulucaris
  - Family Austriocarididae
    - Austriocaris
    - Yangzicaris
  - Family Clausocarididae
    - Clausocaris
    - Convexicaris
  - Family Concavicarididae
    - Concavicaris
    - Harrycaris
    - Paraconcavicaris
    - Atropicaris
  - Family: Microcarididae
    - Ferrecaris
    - Keelicaris
    - Microcaris
    - Thylacocephalus
  - Family: Protozoeidae
    - Globulocaris
    - Hamaticaris
    - Protozoea
    - Pseuderichthus
- Order Conchyliocarida
  - Family: Dollocarididae
    - Dollocaris
    - Mayrocaris
    - Paradollocaris
    - Thylacocaris
  - Family: Ostenocarididae
    - Kilianocaris
    - Ostenocaris

== Anatomy ==
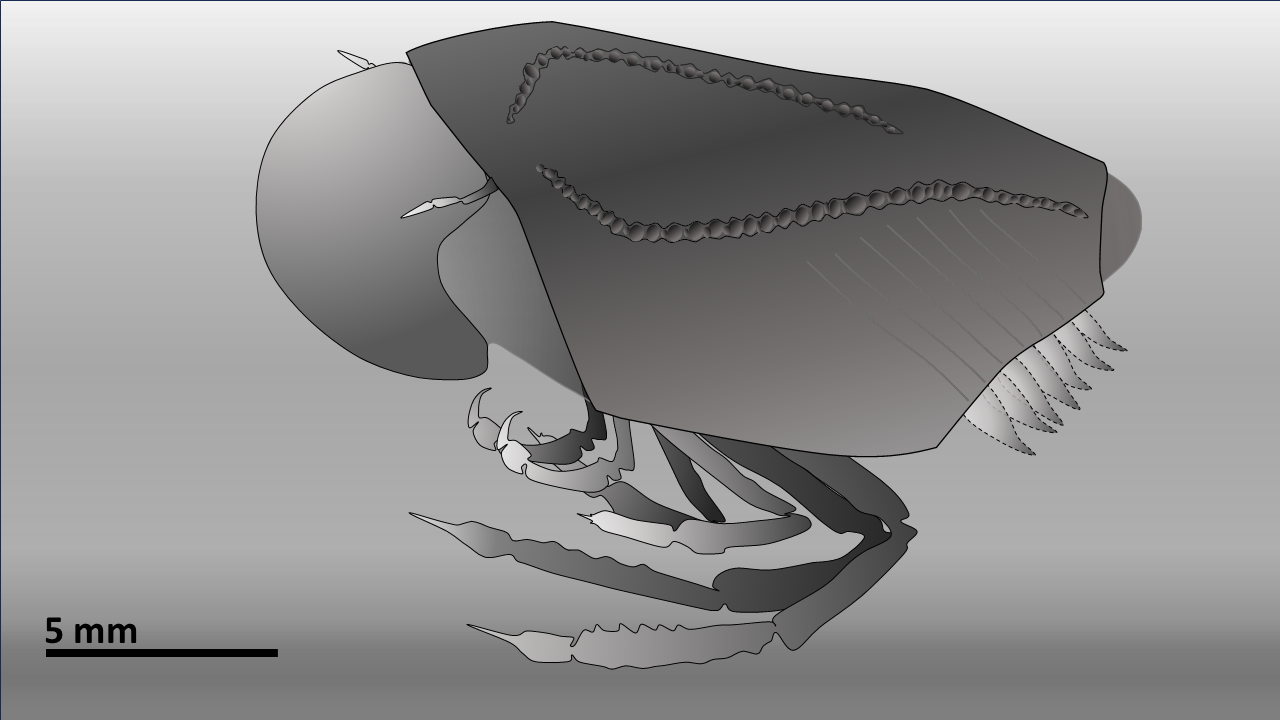
Ostenocaris ribeti

Based on Vannier, modified after Schram: The Thylacocephala are bivalved arthropods with morphology exemplified by three pairs of long raptorial (predatory) appendages and hypertrophied eyes. They have a worldwide distribution. A laterally compressed, shield−like carapace encloses the entire body, and often has an anterior rostrum−notch complex and posterior rostrum. Its lateral surface can be externally ornamented, and evenly convex or with longitudinal ridges. Spherical or drop-shaped eyes are situated in the optic notches, and are often hypertrophied, filling the notches or forming a paired, frontal globular structure. No prominent abdominal features emerge from the carapace, and the cephalon is obscured. Even so, some authors have suggested the presence of five cephalic appendages, three of which could be the very long genticulate and chelate raptorials protruding beyond the ventral margin. Alternatively these could originate from three anterior trunk segments. The posterior trunk has a series of eight to twenty styliform, filamentous pleopod-like appendages, decreasing in size posteriorly. Most Thylacocephala have eight pairs of well developed gills, found in the trunk region.

Beyond this there is a lack of knowledge about even basic thylacocephalan anatomy, including the number of posterior segments, origin of the raptorials, number of cephalic appendages, shape and attachment of gills, character of mouth, stomach and gut. This results from the class's all–encompassing carapace, which prevents the study of their internal anatomy in fossils.

== Affinities ==
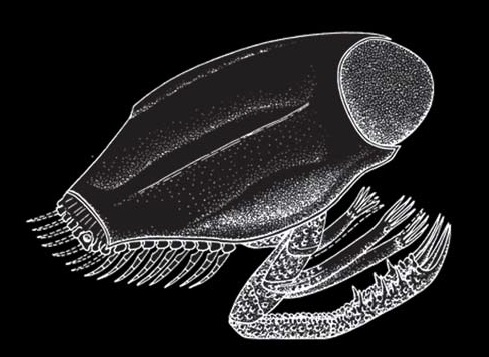
Dollocaris ingens, from the Jurassic aged Voulte-sur-Rhône lagerstätte in France.

It is universally accepted that the Thylacocephala are arthropods, yet the position within this phylum is debated. It had formerly been cautiously assumed that the class was a member of the Crustacea, but no conclusive proof exists. The strongest apomorphy aligning the class with other crustaceans is the carapace. As this feature has evolved independently numerous times within the Crustacea and other arthropods, it is not a very reliable pointer, and such evidence alone remains insufficient to align the class with the crustaceans.

Of the features which could prove crustacean affinities, the arrangement of mouthparts would be the easiest to find in the Thylacocephala. The literature features some mention of such a head arrangement, but none definitive. Schram reports the discovery of mandibles in the Mazon Creek thylacocephalan Concavicaris georgeorum. Secrétan also mentions – with caution – possible mandibles in serial sections of Dollocaris ingens, and traces of small limbs in the cephalic region (not well preserved enough to assess their identity). Lange et al. report a new genus and species, Thylacocephalus cymolopos, from the Upper Cretaceous of Lebanon, which has two possible pairs of antennae, but note the possession of two pairs of antennae alone does not prove the class occupies a position in the crown-group Crustacea.

Despite a lack of evidence for a crustacean body plan, several authors have aligned the class with different groups of crustaceans. Schram provides an overview of possible affinities:

- Nothing in either Uniramia or Cheliceriformes seems likely.
- Conchostraca is possible, but there is no strong supporting evidence.
- A maxillopodan connection is possible. Largely considered due to the Italian researchers' insistence (see disagreements).
- Stomatopods show many parallels but have no comparison to cephalon or body regions.
- Remipedes show some parallels.
- Decapod-like gills suggest malacostracan affinities.

In these various interpretations, numerous different limb arrangements for the three raptorials have been proposed:

- antennules, antennae and mandibles
- antennules, antennae and maxillipeds
- thoracic (in keeping with stromatopod analogies)
- maxillules, maxillae, maxillipedes

Further work is necessary to provide any solid conclusions.

A study in 2022 describing a new arthropod from Wisconsin, Acheronauta, suggested thylacocephalans occupied a position more primitive than the crustaceans and myriapods as basal stem-group mandibulates.

- Total group Mandibulata
  - †Parioscorpio venator
  - - †Cascolus ravitis
    - - †Tanazios dokeron
      - - - †Captopodus poschmanni
          - - †Acheronauta stimulapis
            - †Thylacocephala
        - - †Occacaris oviformis
          - - - Myriapoda
              - - †Ercaicunia multinodosa
                - - - †Clypecaris pteroidea
                    - - - - †Waptia fieldensis
                          - †Perspicaris dictynna
                        - - †Canadaspis perfecta
                          - - †Tokummia katalepsis
                            - †Branchiocaris pretiosa
                      - - - †Nereocaris exilis
                          - †Odaraia alata
                        - - †Euthycarcinoidea
                          - †Fuxianhuiida
            - Pancrustacea (including Hexapoda)

This would place them outside of the crustaceans as a more basal branch of the arthropod family tree. However, other authors have supported a crustacean placement, with a 2021 study of the anatomy of Mayrocaris supporting a remipede affinity for thylacocephalans within Crustacea.

A 2025 study by Laville and colleagues used synchrotron X-ray tomography on fossil thylacocephalan specimens in order to gain a detailed understanding of their internal anatomy in order to determine the position of Thylacocephala within Crustacea. They recovered thylacocephalans as true crustaceans most closely related Malacostraca. A version of their phylogeny is presented below:

- Mandibulata
  - †Aquilonifer
  - - †Tanazios
    - - - †Acheronauta
        - †Captopodus
      - - - †Nereocaris
          - - †Fuxianhuiida
            - †Hymenocarina
        - - - †Euthycarcinida
            - Myriapoda (including centipedes and millipedes)
          - Pancrustacea
            - Allotriocarida
              - Branchiopoda (tadpole shrimp/Triops, fairy shrimp, clam shrimp, water fleas)
              - - Hexapoda (including springtails and insects)
                - Xenocarida
                  - Cephalocarida (horseshoe shrimp)
                  - Remipedia
            - - Oligostraca
                - Branchiura (fish lice)
                - - Ostracoda
                  - Mystacocaridida
              - Multicrustacea
                - Copepoda
                - - Cirripedia (barnacles)
                  - - †Cyclida (Americlidae)
                    - - †Thylacocephala
                      - - Malacostraca (shrimp, prawn, lobsters, mantis shrimp, crab, woodlice, etc)

== Disagreements ==
Numerous conflicts of opinion surround the Thylacocephala, of which the split between the “Italian school” and rest of the world is the most notable. Based on poorly preserved Ostenocaris cypriformis fossils from the Osteno deposits of Lombardy, Pinna et al. erected the class Thylacocephala. Based on inferred cirripede affinities the authors concluded the frontal lobed structure was not an eye, but a 'cephalic sac'. This opinion arose from the misinterpretation of the stomach as a reproductive organ (its contents included vertebral elements of fish, thought to be ovarian eggs). Such an arrangement is reminiscent of cirripede crustaceans, leading the authors to suggest a sessile, filter feeding mode of life, the 'cephalic sac' used to anchor the organism to the seabed. The researchers have since conceded it is highly improbable the ovaries are situated in the head, but maintain that the frontal structure is not an eye. Instead they suggest the 'cephalic sac' is covered with microsclerites, their arguments most recently presented in Alessandrello et al.

- The structure is complex and "presumably multipurpose"
- “Apart from a few features” it shows little affinity with a compound eye
- There is a close connection with stomach residues, sac muscular system and outer hexagonal layer
- Having a stomach between the eyes is unusual
- Sclerites that should correspond to rhabdoms in 'eye theory' are interstitial to the hexagons, not at centre as would be expected for individual ommatidium.
- Structural analogy with cirriped peduncle

Instead the authors suggest the sac is used to break down coarse chunks of food and reject indigestible portions.

All other parties interpret this as a large compound eye, the hexagons being preserved ommatidia (all researchers agree these are the same structure). This is supported by fossils of Dollocaris ingens which are so well preserved that individual retinula cells can be discerned. The preservation is so exceptional that studies have shown the species' numerous small ommatidia, distributed over the large eyes, could reduce the angle between ommatidia, thus improve their ability to detect small objects. Of the arguments above, it is posited by opponents that eyes are complex structures, and those in the Thylacocephala display clear and numerous affinities with compound eyes in other arthropod fossils, down to a cellular level of detail. The 'cephalic sac' structure itself is poorly preserved in Osteno specimens, a possible reason for interstitial 'sclerites'. The structural analogy with a cirripede peduncle lost supporting evidence when the 'ovaries' were shown to be alimentary residues, and the sac muscular system could be used to support the eyes. The unusual position of the stomach is thus the strongest inconsistency, but the Thylacocephala are defined by their unusual features, so this is not inconceivable. Further, Rolfe suggests the eyes' position can be explained if they have a large posterior area of attachment, while Schram suggests that the stomach region extending into the cephalic sac could result from an inflated foregut or anteriorly directed caecum.

Discussion of the matter has ceased in the last decade, and most researchers accept the anterior structure is an eye. Confusion is most likely the result of differing preservation in Osteno.

== Mode of life ==
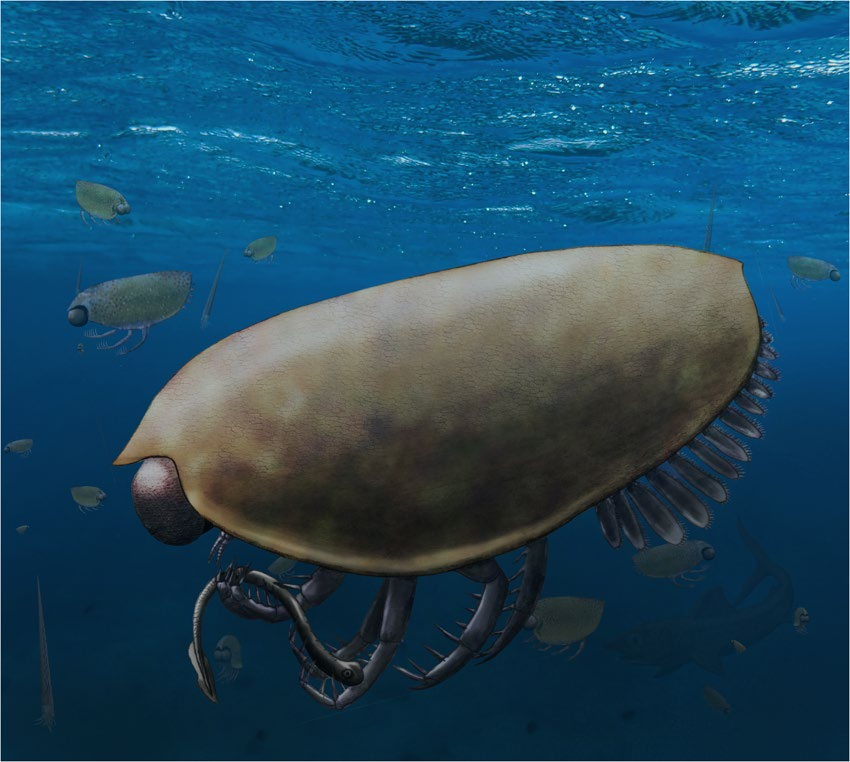
Reconstruction of Concavicaris submarinus preying on a conodont

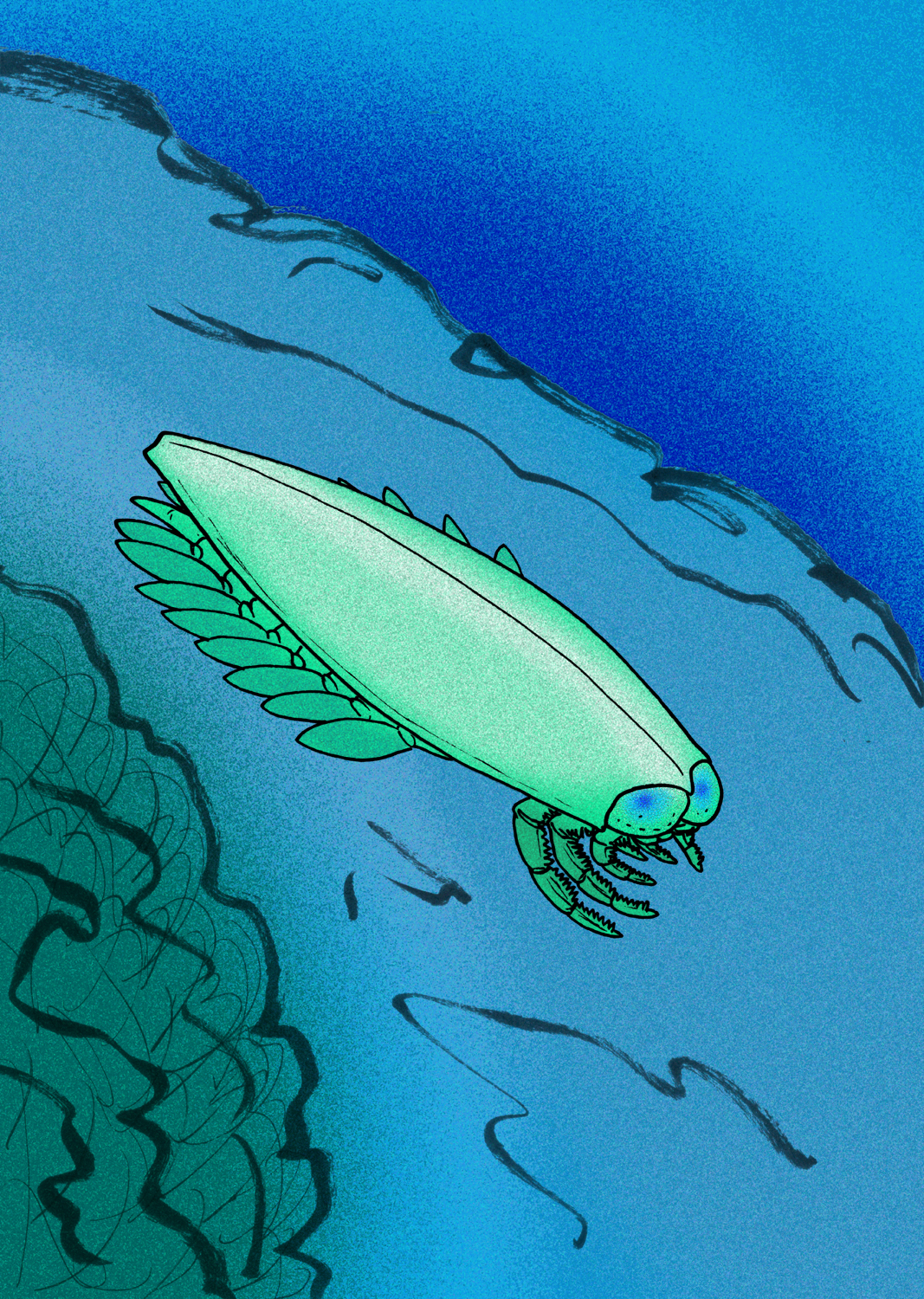
The strange Silurian thylacocephalan Ainiktozoon loganense.

Numerous modes of life have been suggested for the Thylacocephala.

Secrétan suggested Dollocaris ingens was too large to swim, so inferred a predatory 'lurking' mode of life, lying in wait on the sea bed and then springing out to capture prey. The author also suggested it could be necrophagous, supported by Alessandrello et al., who suggest they would have been incapable of directly killing the shark remains found in the Osteno specimens' alimentary residues. Instead they surmise the Thylacocephala could have ingested shark vomit which included such remains.

Vannier et al. note the Thylacocephala possess features which would suggest adaptations for swimming in dim-light environments – a thin, non-mineralized carapace, well-developed rostral spines for possible buoyancy control in some species, a battery of pleopods for swimming, and large prominent eyes. This is supported by the Cretaceous species from Lebanon, which show adaptations for swimming, and possibly schooling.

Rolfe provides many possibilities, but concludes a realistic mode of life is mesopelagic, by analogy with hyperiid amphipods. Further suggests floor-dwelling is also possible, and that the organism could rise to catch prey during the day and return to the sea floor at night. Another notable proposal is that, like hyperiids, the class could gain oil from their food source for buoyancy, an idea supported by their diet (known from stomach residues containing shark and coleoid remains, and other Thylacocephala).

Alessandrello et al. suggest a head-down, semi-sessile life on a soft bottom, in agreement with that of Pinna et al., based on cirripede affinities. A necrophagous diet is suggested.

Briggs & Rolfe report that all the Gogo formation Thylacocephala are found in a reef formation, suggesting a shallow water environment. The authors speculate that due to the terracing of the carapace an infaunal mode of life is possible, or the ridges could provide more friction for hiding in crevices of rock.

Schram suggests a dichotomy in size of the class results from different environments; larger Thylacocephala could have lived in a fluid characterized by turbulent flow, and relied on single power stroke of trunk limbs to position themselves. He suggests that smaller forms may have resided in a viscous medium, characterized by laminar flow, and used a lever to generate the speed necessary to capture prey.

Fossil evidence from the Holy Cross Mountains of Poland shows that thylacocephalans were regularly preyed on by predatory jawed fish during the Late Devonian epoch.
