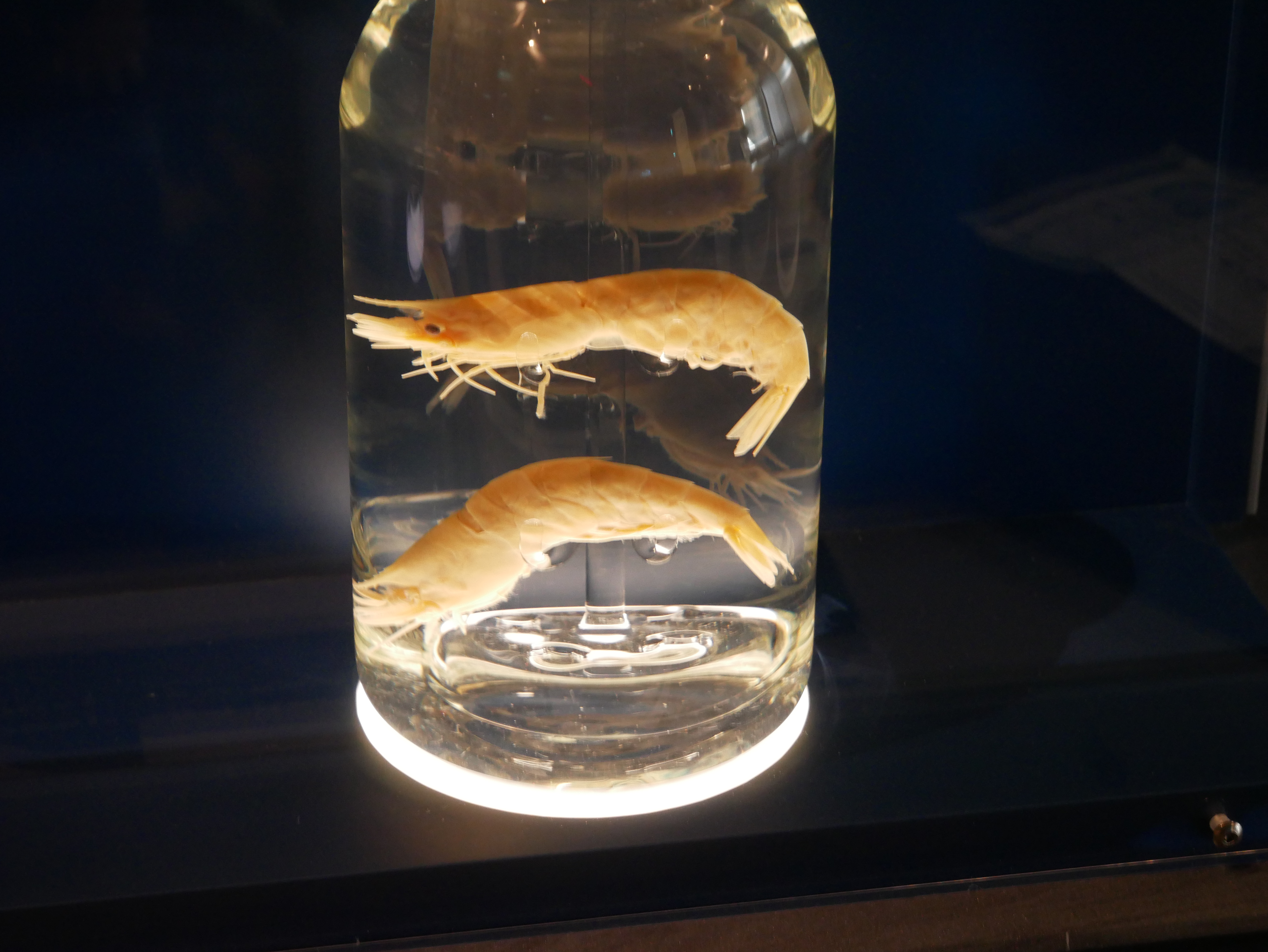
- Preserved specimens of A. pelagica

Scientific classification
- Kingdom: Animalia
- Phylum: Arthropoda
- Class: Malacostraca
- Order: Decapoda
- Suborder: Pleocyemata
- Infraorder: Caridea
- Family: Acanthephyridae
- Genus: Acanthephyra; A. Milne-Edwards, 1881

Type species
- Acanthephyra armata A. Milne-Edwards, 1881

= Acanthephyra =

Genus of shrimp

Acanthephyra is a genus of shrimp in the family Acanthephyridae, with species that live at depths from 0 to more than 5000 meters deep below the ocean surface.

== Species ==
- Acanthephyra acanthitelsonis Spence Bate, 1888
- Acanthephyra acutifrons Spence Bate, 1888
- Acanthephyra armata A. Milne-Edwards, 1881
- Acanthephyra brevicarinata Hanamura, 1984
- Acanthephyra brevirostris Smith, 1885
- Acanthephyra carinata Spence Bate, 1888
- Acanthephyra chacei Krygier & Forss, 1981
- Acanthephyra cucullata Faxon, 1893
- Acanthephyra curtirostris Wood-Mason & Alcock, 1891
- Acanthephyra eximia Smith, 1884
- Acanthephyra faxoni Calman, 1939
- Acanthephyra fimbriata Alcock & Anderson, 1894
- Acanthephyra indica Balss, 1925
- Acanthephyra kingsleyi Spence Bate, 1888
- Acanthephyra media Spence Bate, 1888
- Acanthephyra pelagica Risso, 1816
- Acanthephyra prionota Foxton, 1971
- Acanthephyra purpurea A. Milne-Edwards, 1881
- Acanthephyra quadrispinosa Kemp, 1939
- Acanthephyra rostrata Spence Bate, 1888
- Acanthephyra sanguinea Wood-Mason & Alcock, 1892
- Acanthephyra sibogae of Man, 1916
- Acanthephyra sica Spence Bate, 1888
- Acanthephyra smithi Kemp, 1939
- Acanthephyra stylorostratis Spence Bate, 1888
- Acanthephyra tenuipes Spence Bate, 1888
- Acanthephyra trispinosa Kemp, 1939
