= Tauricornicaris =

Tauricornicaris Temporal range: Cambrian, 518 Ma

Scientific classification
- Kingdom: Animalia
- Phylum: Arthropoda
- Class: incertae sedis
- Genus: †Tauricornicaris; Zeng et al., 2017

Species
- †Tauricornicaris latizonae Zeng et al., 2017; †Tauricornicaris oxygonae Zeng et al. Zhu, 2017

Extinct genus of arthropods

Tauricornicaris is an extinct genus of giant arthropod known from the Cambrian Maotianshan Shales of China. The known fossils were initially interpreted as the head sclerites and swimming flaps of a hurdiid radiodont, but are now interpreted as arthropod tergites. It somewhat resembles Zhenghecaris, which led to the reassignment of the latter within Hurdiidae. However, as Tauricornicaris is no longer classified as a hurdiid, the placement of Zhenghecaris is uncertain.

== See also ==
- Maotianshan Shales
- Paleobiota of the Maotianshan Shales
- Hurdiidae
