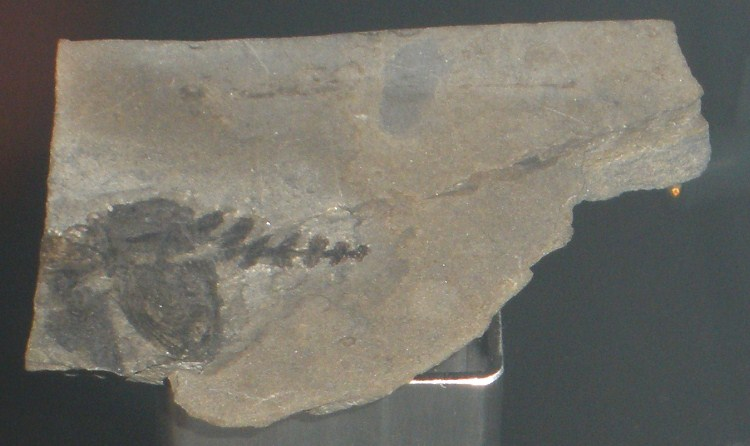
- Upside-down fossil specimen
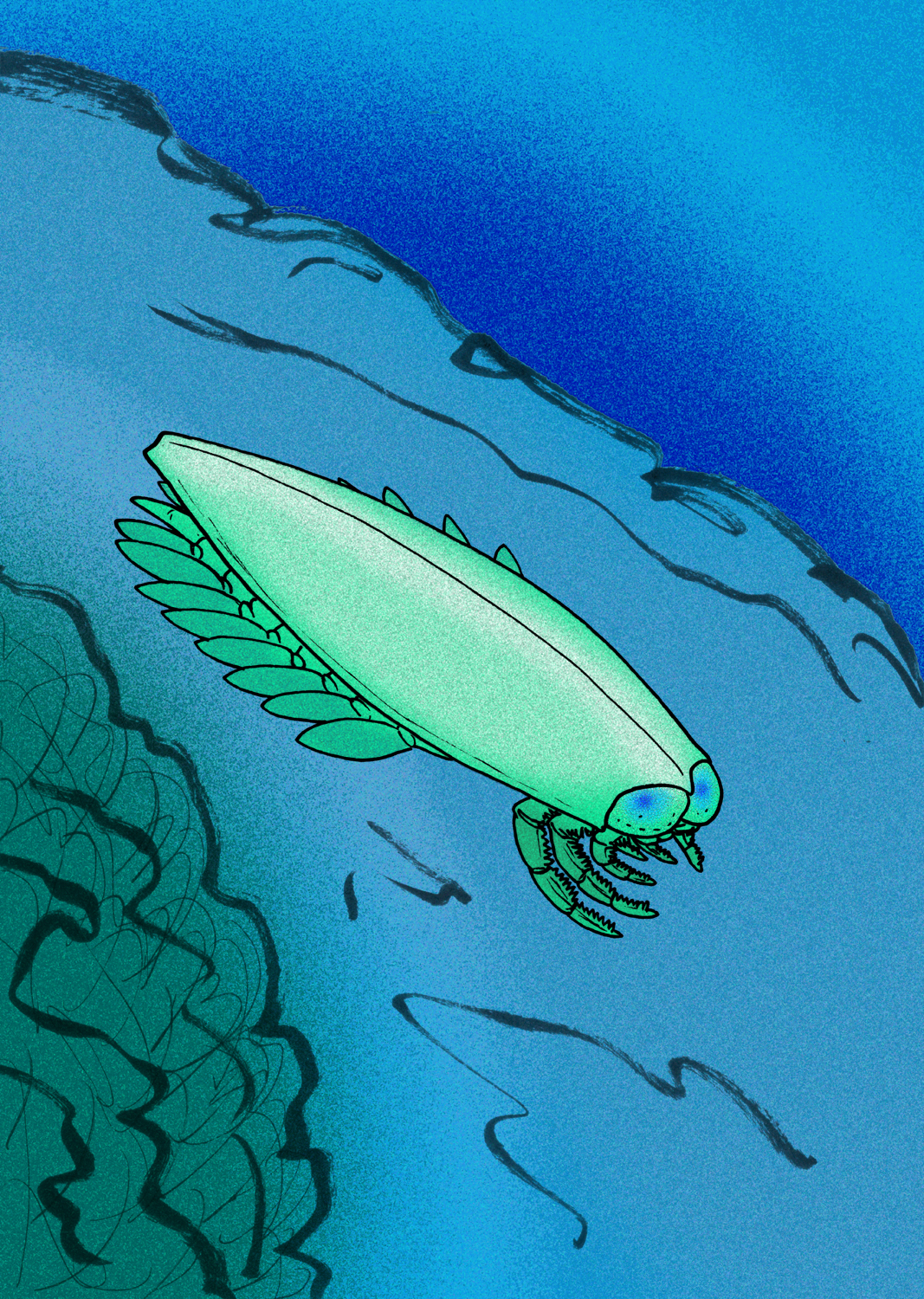
- Reconstruction

Scientific classification
- Kingdom: Animalia
- Phylum: Arthropoda
- Class: †Thylacocephala
- Order: †Concavicarida
- Genus: †Ainiktozoon; Scourfield, 1937
- Species: †A. loganense

Binomial name
- †Ainiktozoon loganense Scourfield, 1937

= Ainiktozoon =

Ainiktozoon loganense Temporal range: Ludlow

Extinct genus of crustaceans

Ainiktozoon loganense ("Logan's enigmatic animal", from αἰνικτός (aíniktós, "riddling, enigmatical"), ζωόν living thing), is a fossil arthropod from the Silurian of Scotland. It was found at the Birk Knowes site, part of the Patrick Burn Formation, near Lesmahagow. Originally described as an early chordate, recent studies suggest that it was in fact an arthropod, more precisely a thylacocephalan crustacean.
