= Palaeocuma =

Palaeocuma Temporal range: Callovian

Scientific classification
- Kingdom: Animalia
- Phylum: Arthropoda
- Class: Malacostraca
- Order: Cumacea
- Genus: †Palaeocuma
- Species: †P. hessi

Binomial name
- †Palaeocuma hessi Bachmayer, 1960

Extinct genus of crustaceans

Palaeocuma hessi is an extinct species of cumacean, the only species in the genus Palaeocuma, and one of very few fossil cumaceans ever discovered. It lived in the Callovian age (Middle Jurassic) in France.
