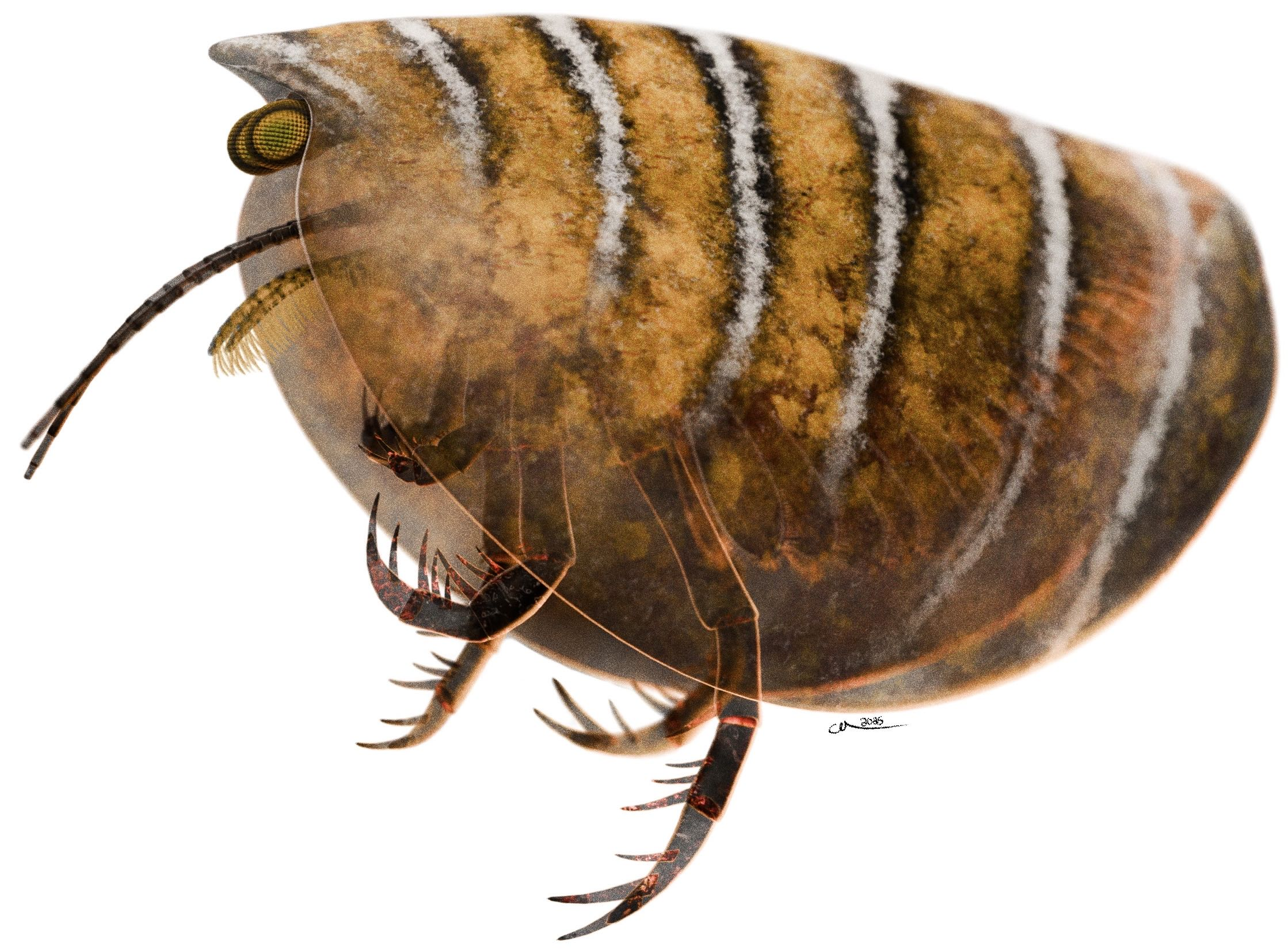
- Reconstruction of T. brandonensis
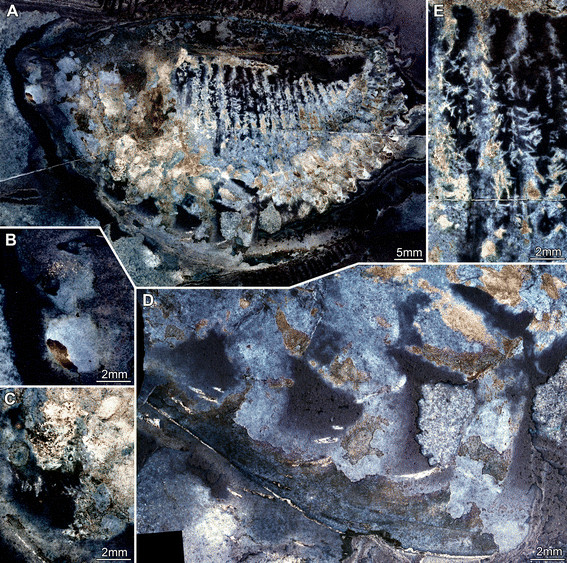
- assorted T. brandonensis fossils

Scientific classification
- Kingdom: Animalia
- Phylum: Arthropoda
- Class: †Thylacocephala
- Family: †incertae sedis
- Genus: †Thylacares
- Species: †T. brandonensis

Binomial name
- †Thylacares brandonensis Haug et al., 2014

= Thylacares =

Thylacares Temporal range: Silurian

Extinct genus of crustaceans from Wisconsin

Thylacares is a genus of thylacocephalan containing only the single species Thylacares brandonensis.

Found in Silurian period strata from the Brandon Bridge Formation in Waukesha, Wisconsin, U.S., the species is distinguishable from other thylacocephalans by its smaller raptorial appendages and compound eyes. The body is fully encased in a bivalve shell, with only the eyes protruding on stalks. The species' trunk is composed of about 22 segments. It was once considered the oldest known thylacocephalan, before older specimens were found in Ordovician rocks.
