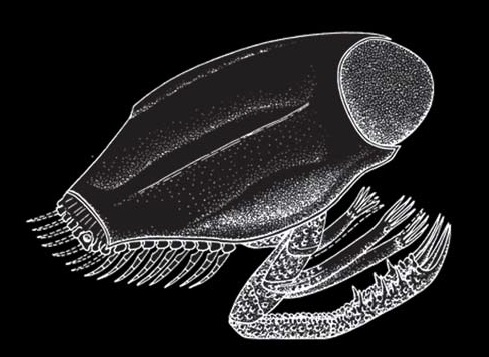
- Reconstruction of Dollocaris ingens

Scientific classification
- Kingdom: Animalia
- Phylum: Arthropoda
- Class: †Thylacocephala
- Order: †Conchyliocarida
- Family: †Dollocarididae
- Genus: †Dollocaris van Straelen 1923

Type species
- Dollocaris ingens van Straelen, 1923

= Dollocaris =

Dollocaris Temporal range: Jurassic

Extinct genus of crustaceans

Dollocaris is an extinct genus of thylacocephalan that lived during the Jurassic period. Fossils have been found in France, specifically the La Voulte-sur-Rhône lagerstätte. It is known for its massive compound eyes, giving Dollocaris a rather characteristic appearance. One species is currently known, D. ingens.

== Description ==
Adult specimens of Dollocaris measured over 30 cm (12 in) in length. It sported a row of small appendages to assist in swimming, as well as three pairs of clawed segmented legs, but it was probably a poor swimmer, instead depending on ambush to hunt prey. It is known for its well-preserved, large compound eyes, sporting well-preserved individual retinula cells, which assisted in catching prey.

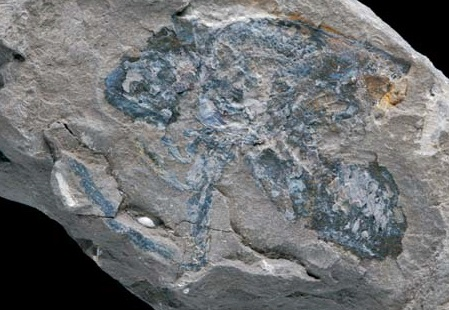
Fossil specimen
