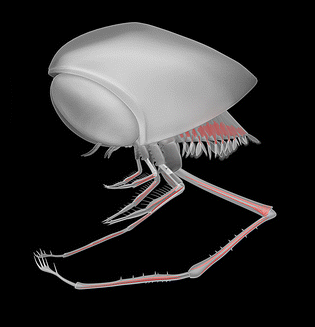
- Reconstruction of Clausocaris lithographica

Scientific classification
- Domain: Eukaryota
- Kingdom: Animalia
- Phylum: Arthropoda
- Class: †Thylacocephala
- Order: †Conchyliocarida
- Genus: †Clausocaris
- Species: †C. lithographica

Binomial name
- †Clausocaris lithographica Polz, 1989

= Clausocaris =

Clausocaris Temporal range: Tithonian

Extinct genus of crustaceans

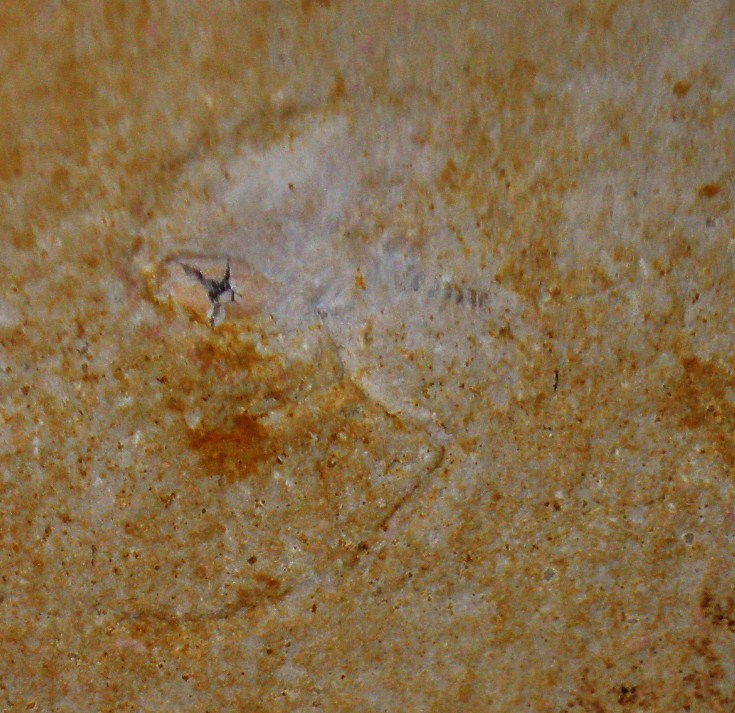
Clausoclaris lithographica specimen

Clausocaris is an extinct genus of Thylacocephalan containing the single species Clausocaris lithographica from the Late Jurassic (Tithonian) aged Solnhofen Limestone in Germany. It was originally named Clausia by Oppenheim in 1888, but was later changed to Clausocaris. The morphology suggests a lifestyle of a mobile or ambush oceanic predator.

Fossils have shown a carapace covering the bulk of its body, with compound eyes, possible gills, and also "raptorial appendages" controlled by "substantial striated muscles".
