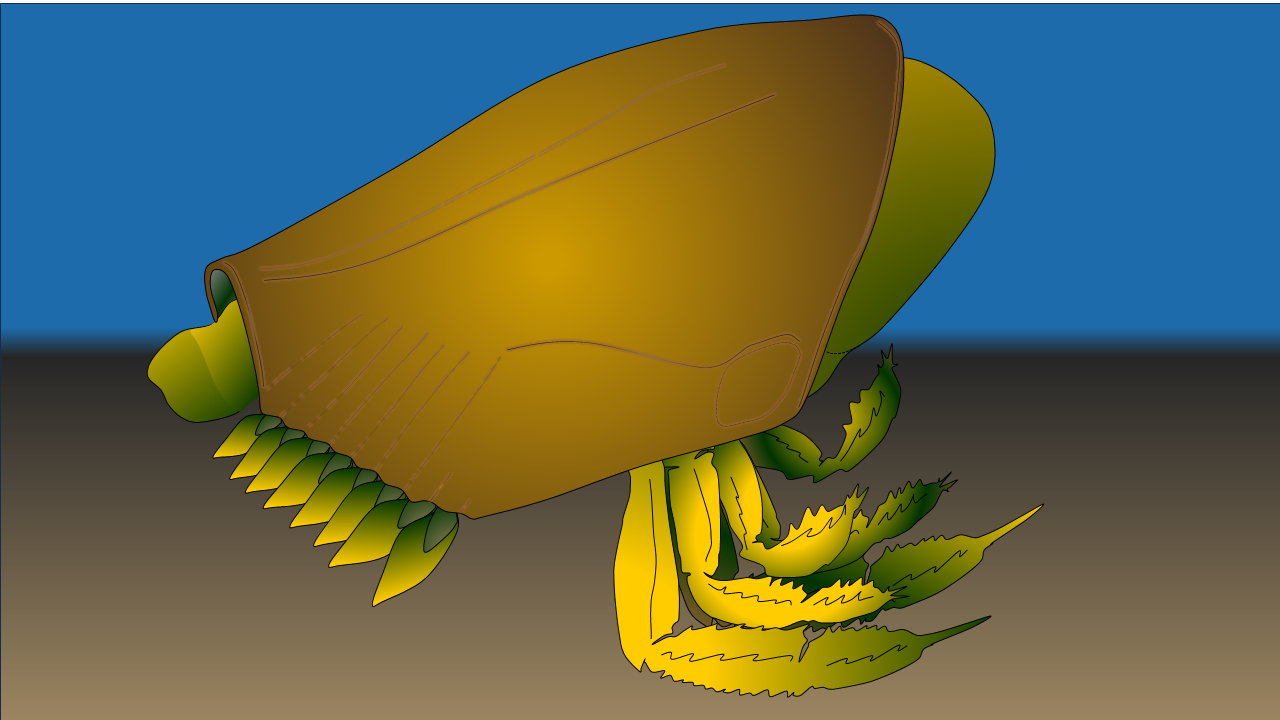
- Reconstruction

Scientific classification
- Kingdom: Animalia
- Phylum: Arthropoda
- Class: †Thylacocephala
- Order: †Conchyliocarida
- Family: †Ostenocarididae; Arduini, Pinna & Teruzzi, 1980
- Genus: †Ostenocaris; Arduini, Pinna & Teruzzi, 1980
- Species: †O. cypriformis

Binomial name
- †Ostenocaris cypriformis Arduini, Pinna & Teruzzi, 1980

= Ostenocaris =

Ostenocaris Temporal range: Sinemurian to Callovian 198–164 Ma

Extinct genus of crustaceans

Ostenocaris is a Jurassic genus of giant thylacocephalan arthropod, sufficiently distinct from its relatives to be placed in its own family, Ostenocarididae. It comprises at least two known species, Ostenocaris cypriformis (Arduini, Pinna, Teruzzi, 1980) and Ostenocaris ribeti (Secrétan, 1985). It is an enigmatic taxon, whose physiology and life habits are still poorly known from fossil material. Initially (early 1980s) it was thought to be a filter-feeding, partially infaunal, eyeless organism, or a bizarre barnacle named "Ostenia cypriformis". More recently, as in general for the group to which it belongs, the Thylacocephala, the interpretation has shifted to a necrophagous or predatory organism, demersal or nectonic, with highly developed eyes and of deep-sea environment.

It is believed to be a bethonic animal and one of the most important necrophagous animals of its environment. Ostenocaris is the most common fossil and main identified thylacocephalan from the Moltrasio Formation of Italy. In the first interpretations, the genus was shown as a filter-feeding organism, which used the cephalic sac as a burrowing organ to ensure adhesion to the substrate. Based on the presence of coprolites associated to the genus, with abundant masses of alimentary residues (hooks of cephalopods, vertebrates, and remains of crustaceans) in the stomach of these organisms, Ostenocaris cypriformis was probably necrophagous, and the cephalic sac can be tentatively interpreted as being a burrowing organ employed during the search for food, or as an organ of locomotion with intrinsic mobility. Later studies agree that cephalic sac is actually extremely large compound eyes.

== Distribution ==
Ostenocaris lived during the Sinemurian age of the Lower Jurassic, and has been found in rocks at two sites in the Italian Lombardische Kieselkalk Formation. This formation is known for its good preservation, with fossils of annelids, fishes, and plants, representing a relatively depth shelf deposit, where Thylacocephalans are the most abundant organisms. A second species found in the Middle Jurassic (Callovian) La Voulte-sur-Rhône Lagerstätte of France, formerly known as Clausocaris ribeti was reclassified as second Ostenocaris species. This species lived in a bathyal zone environment, in a depth most probably exceeding 200 m.

== Description ==
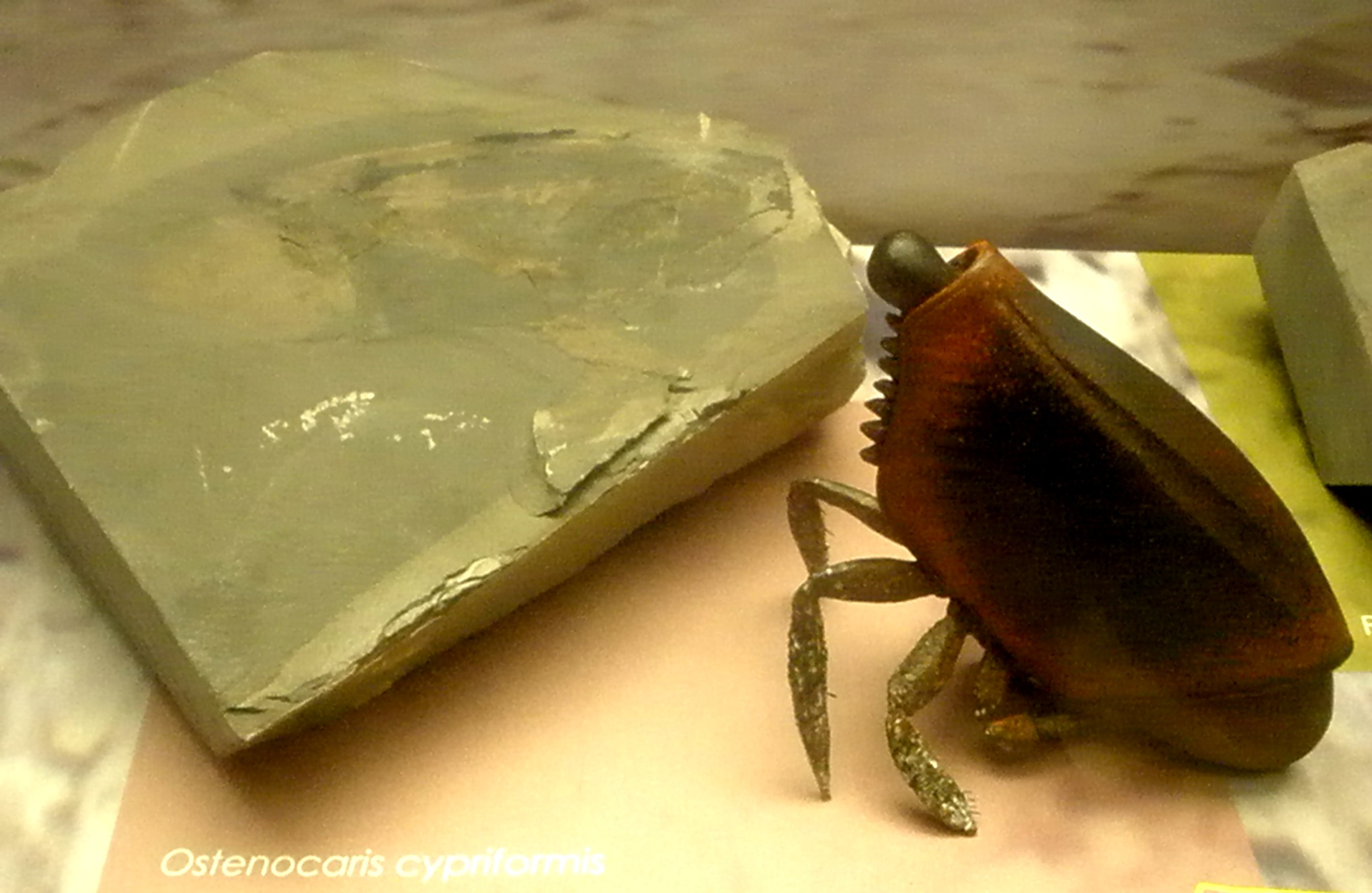
Ostenocaris cypriformis fossil and reconstructive model; the latter shows the life position as originally interpreted, with the "cephalic sac" lacking eyes downward (assumed partially sunken into the bottom sediments).

The original description reported in summary:

- A thin "univalve" carapace up to about 20 cm in length, trapezoidal in shape, consisting of a dorsal area connected seamlessly to two lateral areas folded downward, the whole resulting in a large cavity containing most of the body. Presence on the outer wall of a dorsal median groove and two longitudinal lateral carinae, of which the lower one is connected downward in the anterior region to a strong muscular imprint (interpreted as an insertion of an adductor muscle on the inner part of the carapace). Dorsal margin convex; anterior margin concave and posterior margin short and straight connected to the lower (“oral”) margin by an arcuate tract affected by a series of oblique parallel impressions.
- A large "cephalic sac" protruding from the anterior margin of the carapace and covered with minute elements defined as "sclerites", which would occupy the entire mid-anterior portion of the carapace, with a globular structure inside interpreted as reproductive ("ovarian sac").
- A structure with broad, ansate circumvolutions, interpreted as a digestive tube.
- A series of eight segments corresponding to posterior parallel impressions on the outer surface of the carapace, interpreted as thoracic metameres of short, pointed "thoracopods".
- An extremely small abdomen, partly protruding from the posterior margin and containing an elongated structure interpreted as a "penis".
- At the lower margin of the carapace would be the mouth, fitted with ill-defined filtering structures (mandibles and maxillae).
- Two pairs of antennulae and antennae modified into ambulatory appendages formed by 4 segments, provided with spines in the second and third segments and digitations in the last, followed by an additional pair of more developed appendages, also 4-segmented (interpreted as maxillipedes and afferent to the first of the "thoracic segments"), terminating in a pointed styliform segment.

With this very peculiar type of organization, the institutors of the class interpreted these forms as basically sessile, detritivorous animals, partly fossorial but endowed with the possibility of autonomous movement by limited displacements made through the more developed appendages, which could also serve to attach themselves to the bottom composed of incoherent fine sediments and "stir" the sediments themselves for filtration. The muscular "cephalic sack" would have allowed for movements designed to promote sinking within the surface layer of sediments.

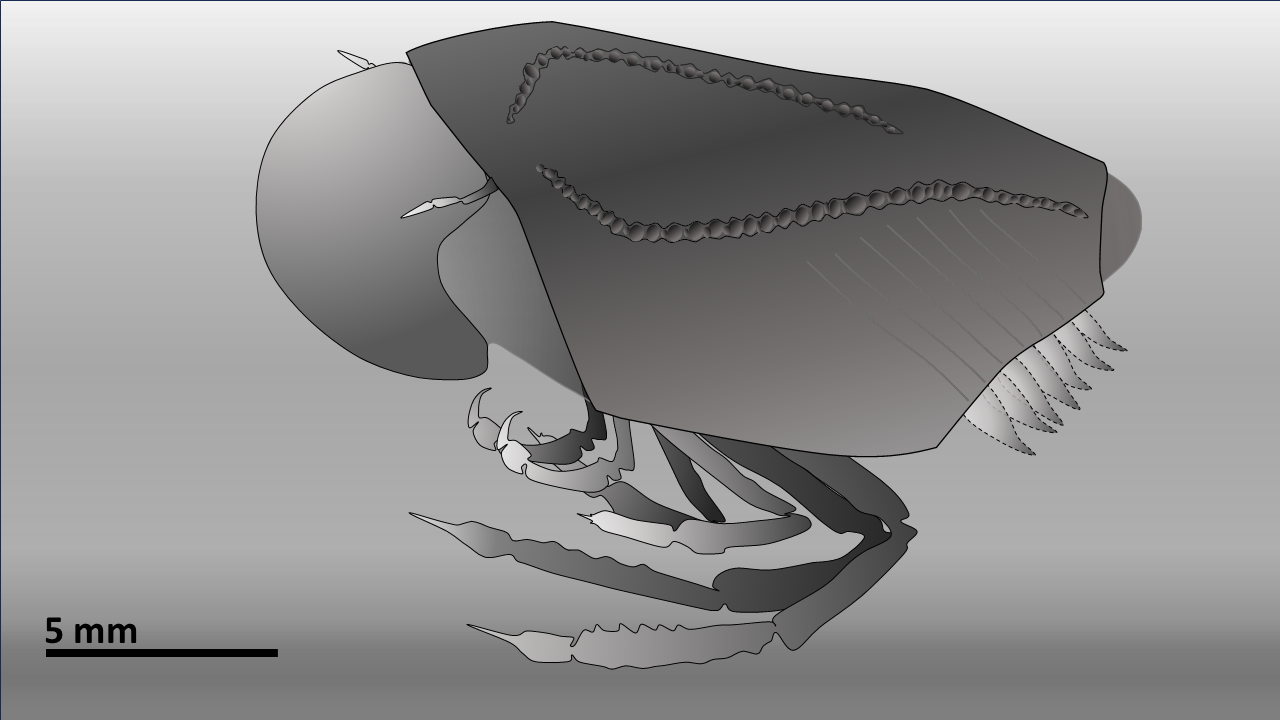
Tentative reconstruction of Ostenocaris ribeti

In the years since this early work, forms referable to tylacocephali have been recognized and revised in a large number of age ranges, stratigraphic horizons, and taphonomic conditions; as a result of this, various observations and controversies within the scientific community have led to a rather radical revision from the original description and interpretation. The main new elements are:

- The presence in O. cypriformis of residues of organisms (fish, cephalopod hooks, crustacean remains) within the digestive system.
- The recognition in O. cypriformis of compound eyes of considerable size (previously interpreted as "cephalic sac" lacking eyes), which led to substantial corrections in the interpretation of these organisms, no longer as sessile organisms (only occasionally and limitedly ambulatory) but as mobile and probably predatory and/or necrophagous.
- The presence of at least eight pairs of structures interpretable as gills (originally misunderstood as the loops of a highly developed intestine).
- The "ovarian sac" originally described in the diagnosis of O. cypriformis (containing elements interpreted as eggs) actually turned out to be a collection of fish vertebral elements (thus part of the contents of the digestive system), making the presence of reproductive structures in the cephalic segment unlikely. Moreover, this would imply a “stomach” placed far forward (just behind and between the eyes), while the structure interpreted as the intestine actually constitutes the gill group.
- The bivalve organization of the carapace.
- The presence in several other better-preserved forms of highly developed compound eyes, similar to those of present-day necto-planktonic crustacean forms (Hyperiidea) seems to indicate an adaptation to conditions of high water-beating depth and consequent poor illumination; the high density of ommatidia (originally interpreted in Ostenocaris as "sclerites") would imply good visual resolution, with the ability to distinguish small objects.
- The recognition of the raptatory function of the appendages, afferent furthermore to the thoracic and not the cephalic region.
- The presence (verified at least in some forms) of antennules and antennae ventral to the rostrum, an element that brings them closer to crustaceans and makes the origin of the raptorial appendages from the modification of antennae unlikely.
- The presence of posterior appendages equipped with setae with ambulatory or swimming function, similar to the abdominal pleiopods of crustaceans.

The class of tylacocephali has also been subdivided into two orders, with a classification based on the organization of the visual apparatus and the attached elements of the exoskeleton and not on other anatomical elements (appendages, segmentation) less easily distinguishable in the fossil material: Concavicarida (Briggs & Rolfe, 1983), consisting of tylacocephalans with a carapace equipped with a prominent rostral apparatus overlying a well-defined optic notch anteriorly and Conchyliocarida (Secrétan, 1983), consisting of tylacocephalans with a poorly defined visual notch and rostrum and eyes located on the surface of a large cephalic "sac". Ostenocaris, because of the particularly voluminous cephalic sac consisting almost entirely of hypertrophic eyes, was assigned to this order.

More recently, the new species Ostenocaris ribeti has been established from the Callovian of southeastern France, the second reported in the genus Ostenocaris. This species differs from the type species of the genus mainly in size (1.7 cm at most, whereas O. cypriformis reaches 20 cm), in the presence of two keels (dorso-lateral and medio-lateral) that are much more pronounced than in O. cypriformis and strongly tuberculate, and in the hooked termination of the first pair of raptorial appendages; the dorsal margin also appears less convex. A cephalic appendage at the anterior margin of the carapace, consisting of at least three elements, also appears to be present.

== Paleoenvironment ==
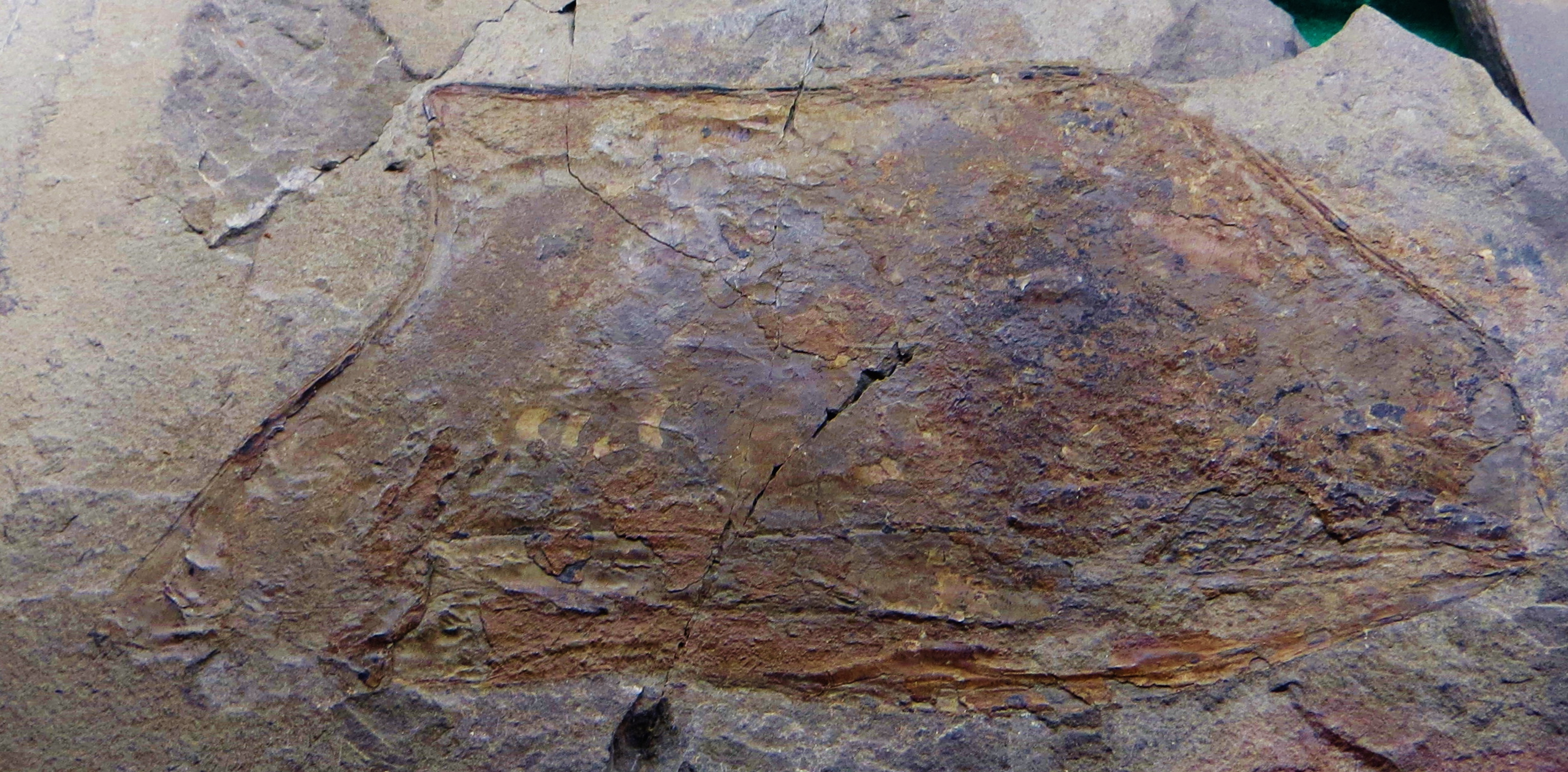
Fossil of Ostenocaris

The interpretation of these forms has thus changed considerably over the past 40 years. At present, the prevailing interpretation identifies tylacocephalans (including Ostenocaris) as predatory and/or necrophagous carnivores adapted to relatively deep sea contexts (greater than 200 m depth), falling within the bathyal plane, with faunal associations in which arthropods are an important or dominant component, associated with polychaetes, ophiuroids, fish, and cephalopods, within poriferans (siliceous sponges) and crinoid "grasslands". However, these were much more mobile forms than assumed at the beginning of the studies, probably at least partly nectonic.

O. cypriformis was originally found in a stratigraphic and structural context corresponding to the depocenter of the Monte Generoso tectonic basin, within the geodynamic framework of the rift process that affected from the Late Triassic (Norian) to the Middle Jurassic the southern margin of the Tethys Ocean, resulting in a strong paleogeographic and paleobathymetric differentiation between structural highs (horst) and basins (graben) with roughly north-south trend. The Monte Generoso basin is an asymmetrical graben with the steepest margin to the west, corresponding to a fault of regional importance (Lugano Fault) and extended in the area currently from western Varesotto to the Lecco area; the eastern Comasco area corresponds to its depocenter, in which carbonate sediments of predominantly turbiditic origin of the Moltrasio Formation were deposited in the Lower Jurassic (Sinemurian-Pliensbachian). Since the beginning of the Jurassic, from Hettangian to earliest Sinemurian on the western Lombardy Basin there was a notorious continental area that was found to be wider than previously thought, where a warm humid paleoclimate developed. The basin facies are characterized by a gradual transition from Upper Rhaetian shallow-water carbonates to Lombard siliceous limestone and thick Lower Liassic series. The dinosaur fossils found on the Saltrio formation can have been translated from this area, or alternatively, the Arbostora swell (that was located at the north of the Saltrio formation, on Switzerland). This was an emerged structural high close to the local marine units (Saltrio Formation & Moltrasio Formation), that caused a division between two near subsiding basins located at Mt. Nudo (East) and Mt. Generoso (West). It settled over a carbonate platform linked with other wider areas that appear along the west to the southeast, developing a large shallow water gulf to the north, where the strata deposited was controlled by a horst and tectonic gaben.

In the Osteno area, there was a hemipelagic sedimentary seafloor with poor oxygenation, subject to anoxic episodes, characterized by dark micritic deposits laminated with abundant siliceous sponge spicules and rich in organic matter; these are two lenses only a few meters thick, corresponding to local situations, lateral to turbiditic flows; here, seafloor faunas developed and within which Ostenocaris lived.

O. ribeti was found in the lagerstätte deposit of La Voulte-sur-Rhône (Callovian, Middle Jurassic terminal plateau) of Ardèche, southwestern France, in a continental escarpment base context with deep-sea fine terrigenous sediments, adjacent to the margin of the Massif Central to the southeast, within a marine basin connected to the Tethys.

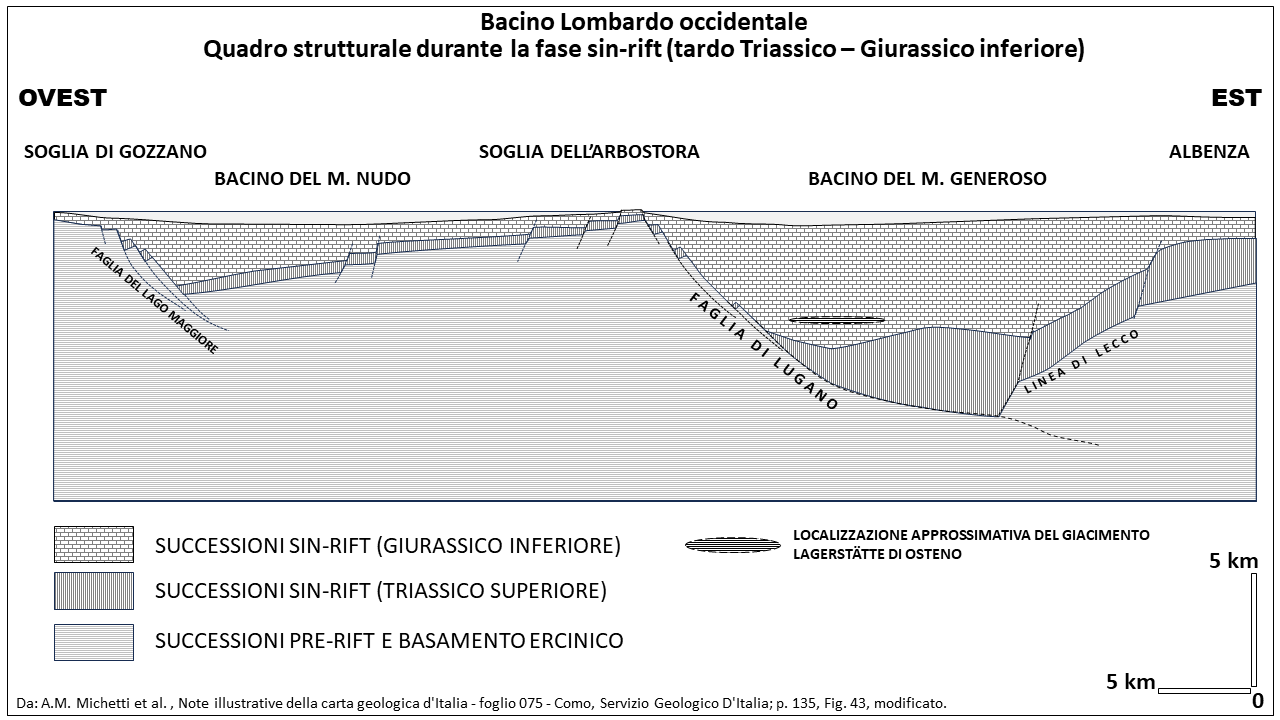
Structural scheme illustrating the syn-rift setting of the western Lombardian Basin during late Triassic and early Jurassic (most of the early jurassic terms belong to the calcare di Moltrasio and secondarily to Calcare di Domaro and Rosso Ammonitico Lombardo). The approximated location in the context of Osteno lagerstätte is indicated. References in the image.

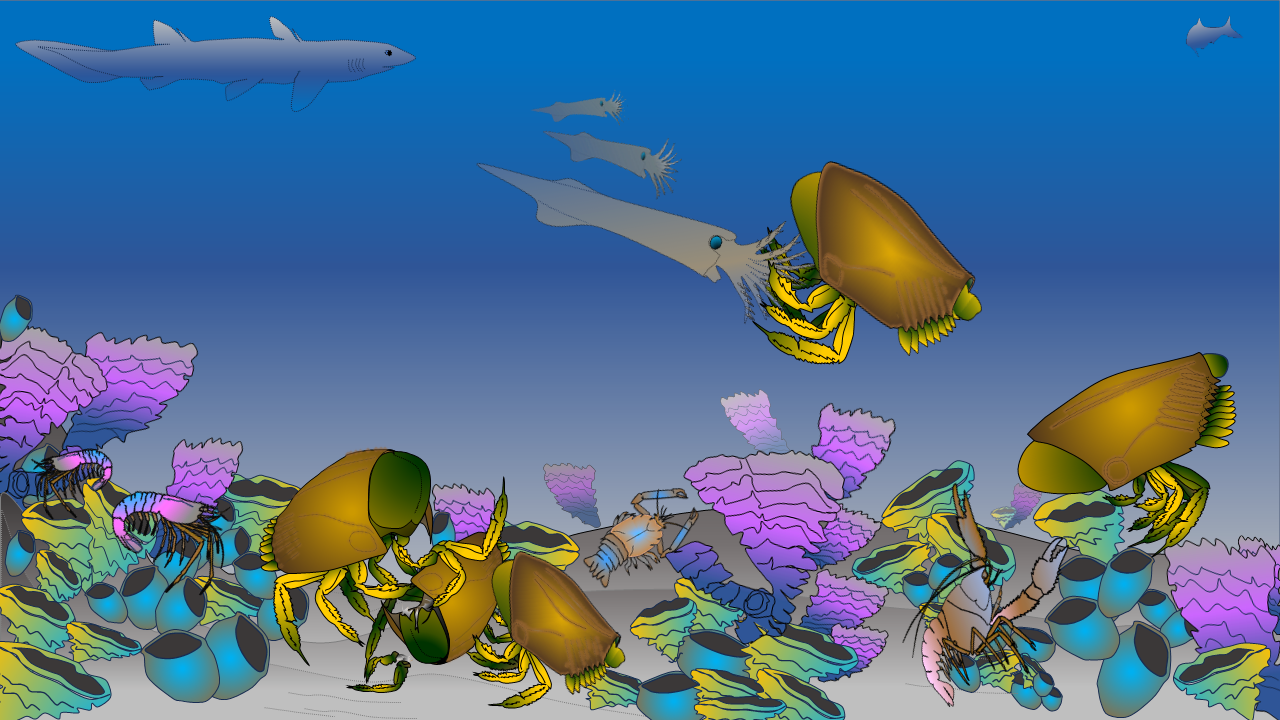
Artistic reconstruction of a hypothetical scene related to the Osteno deposit (Sinemurian-Lower Jurassic). Ostenocaris cypriformis are hunting cephalopods (Ostenoteuthis) and other arthropods (Coleia, Phlyctisoma). Two feed on the carcass of a conspecific. The sediment, which is very rich in siliceous sponge spicules, indicates that these forms were common and formed true “grasslands” on the seabed. The shark-like Palaeospinax pinnai passes in the background.
