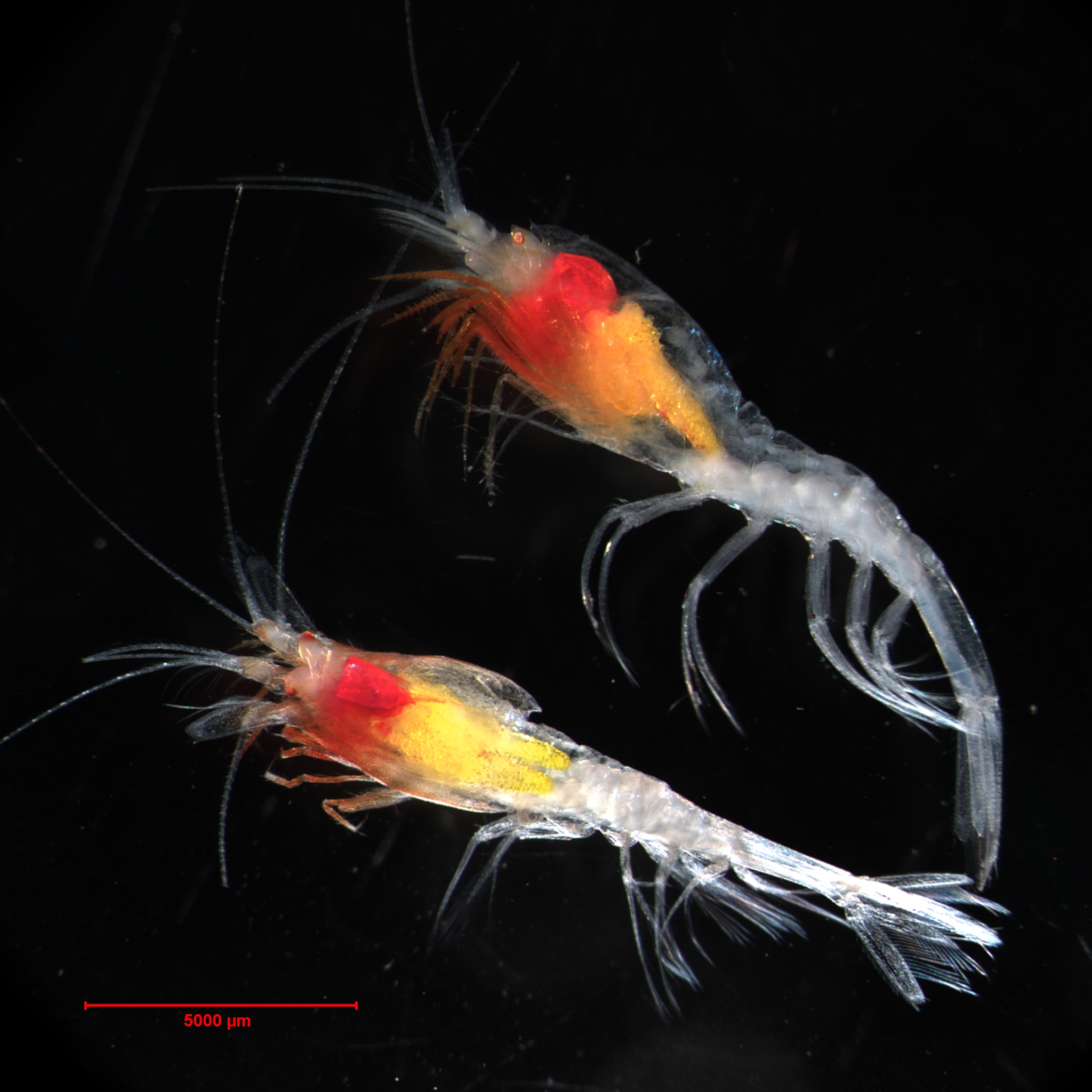
- Hymenodora glacialis

Scientific classification
- Kingdom: Animalia
- Phylum: Arthropoda
- Clade: Pancrustacea
- Class: Malacostraca
- Order: Decapoda
- Suborder: Pleocyemata
- Infraorder: Caridea
- Superfamily: Oplophoroidea; Dana, 1852
- Family: Oplophoridae; Dana, 1852

= Oplophoridae =

Family of crustaceans

The family Oplophoridae is a taxon of pelagic shrimp and the only subtaxon of the superfamily Oplophoroidea. It contains the following genera:

- Acanthephyra A. Milne-Edwards, 1881
- Ephyrina Smith, 1885
- Heterogenys Chace, 1986
- Hymenodora Sars, 1877
- Janicella Chace, 1986
- Kemphyra Chace, 1986
- Meningodora Smith, 1882
- Notostomus A. Milne-Edwards, 1881
- † Odontochelion Garassino, 1994
- Oplophorus H. Milne-Edwards, 1837
- Systellaspis Bate, 1888
- † Tonellocaris Garassino, 1998

Molecular phylogenetics suggests that the family as currently circumscribed is polyphyletic, and may lead to the resurrection of a family Acanthephyridae for all genera except Oplophorus, Systellaspis and Janicella.
