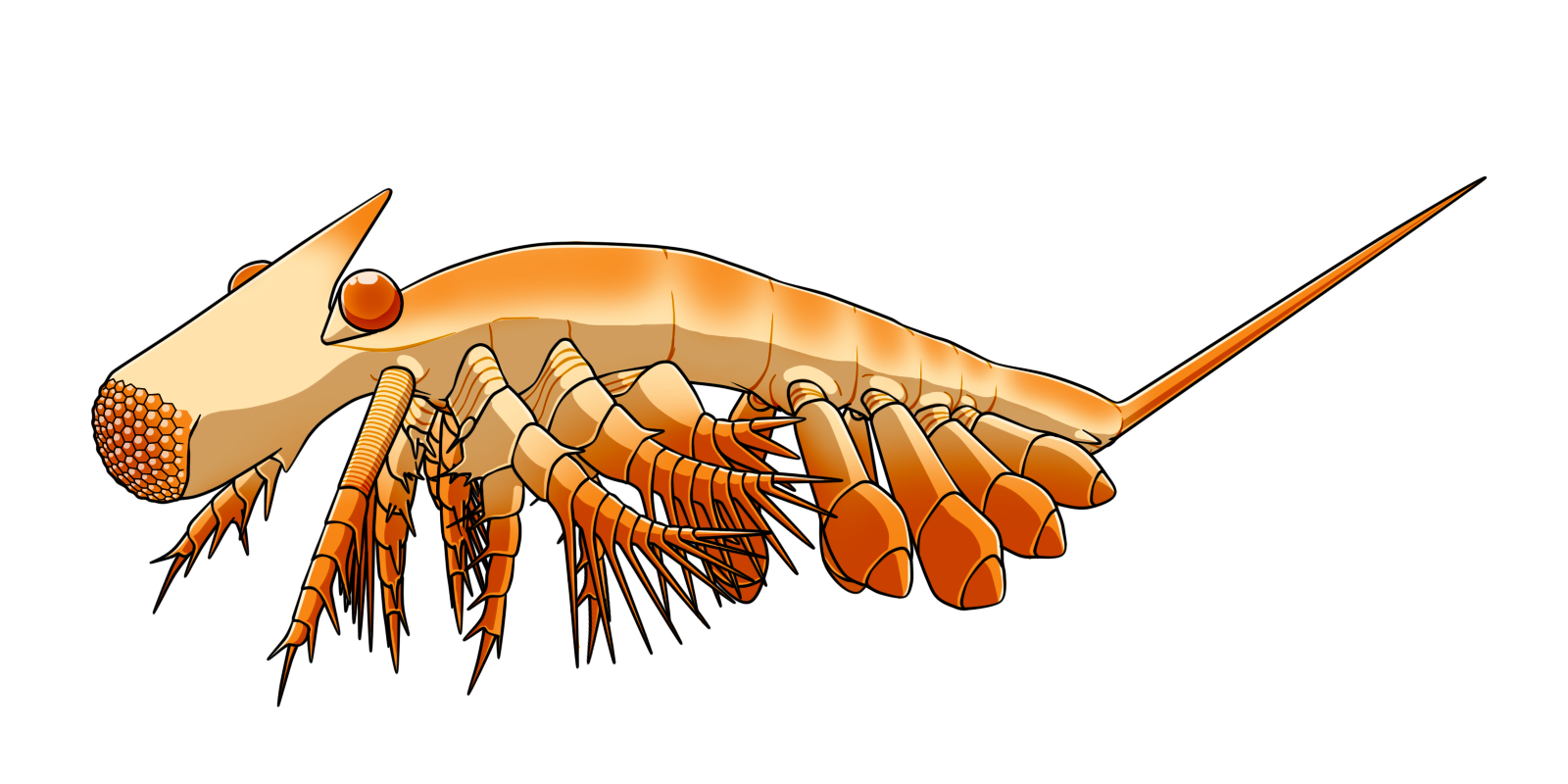
- Reconstruction

Scientific classification
- Kingdom: Animalia
- Phylum: Arthropoda
- Family: †Cambropachycopidae
- Genus: †Goticaris; Walossek & Müller, 1990
- Species: †G. longispinosa

Binomial name
- †Goticaris longispinosa Walossek & Müller, 1990

= Goticaris =

Goticaris Temporal range: Upper Cambrian

Extinct genus of arthropods

Goticaris is an extinct genus of enigmatic Cambrian arthropod consisting of the single species Goticaris longispinosa, known from the Orsten lagerstätten in southern Sweden. It appears to have several apomorphic features, notably including a large compound eye.

== Etymology ==
The genus name Goticaris is in reference to the Gotes, a tribe which inhabited southern Sweden in the “Dark Ages”. The species name longispinosa refers to the long caudal spine.

== Description ==
Originally, Goticaris was estimated to be approximately 1 mm (0.04 in) long, but new specimens helped infer the new size at 3 mm (0.12 in) long.

The head of Goticaris has an unusual anterior projection of the head that bears a single large and what are possibly two smaller stalked compound eyes. There are four pairs of appendages on its head. The first pair of appendages are treated as antennae, and the other appendages on head are biramous. The mouth opens on the ventral surface in front of the second pair of appendages. The abdomen has four segments with four pairs of paddle-shaped uniramous appendages and a hind body, with an area without appendages between the head and the appendage-bearing segments. Finally there is a telson.

Unlike Cambropachycope, the cephalic shield and tergites of Goticairs are inconspicuous.

== Classification ==
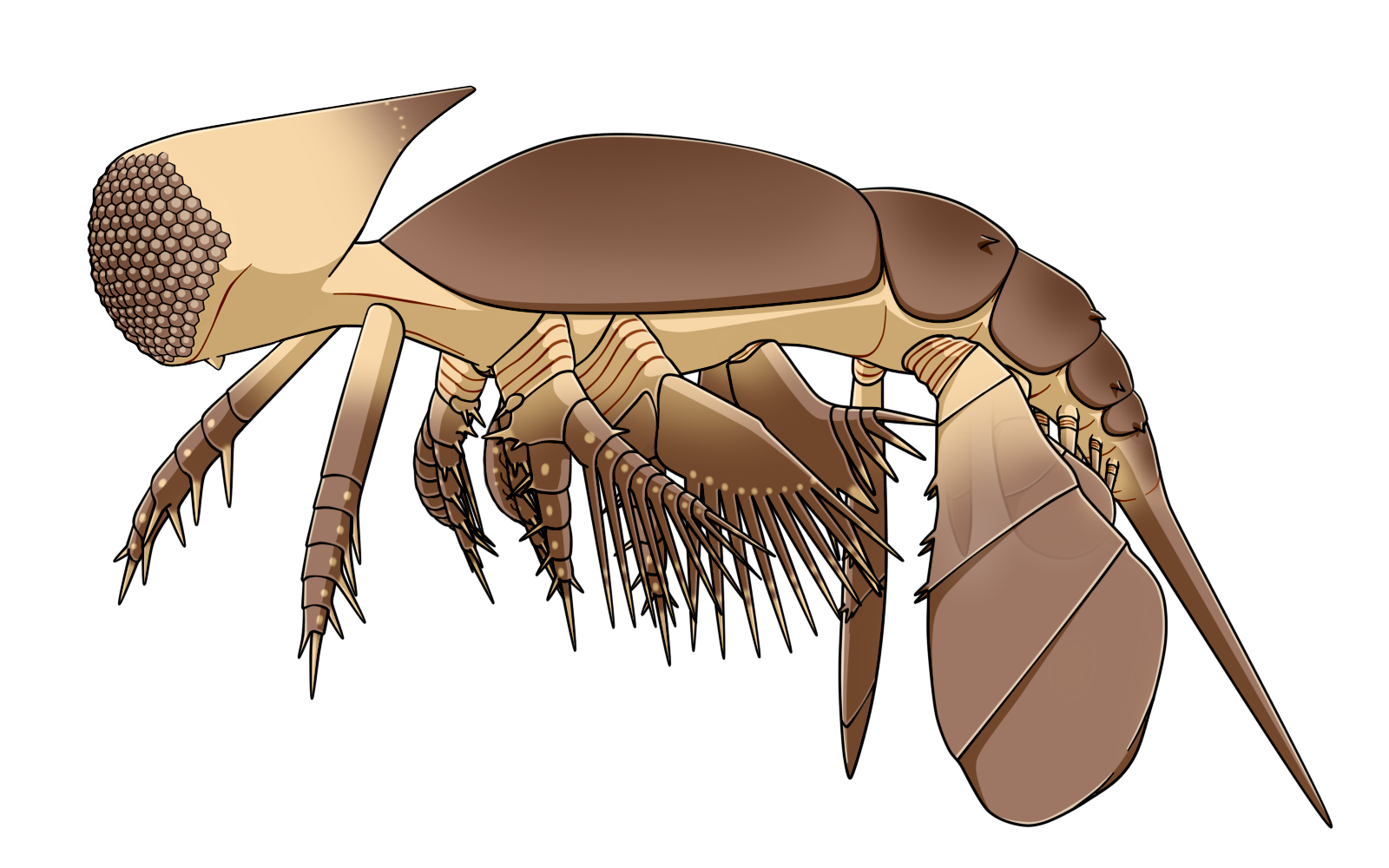
Reconstruction of Cambropachycope, genus related to Goticaris

It is hesitantly presumed to be an early offshoot under the clade Pancrustacea in original description. Other organisms, including Henningsmoenicaris and Martinssonia, also discovered in Orsten, may exist at a similar place on the phylogenetic tree. Collectively, this may have implications for the origins of the crustaceans. However, a later study placed this genus outside Pancrustacea and it was treated only as a stem-group mandibulate.

== See also ==
- Cambropachycope
- Diplostraca, a group of crustaceans with a single compound eye
  - Bythotrephes longimanus, a diplostracan that has been compared to Goticaris
