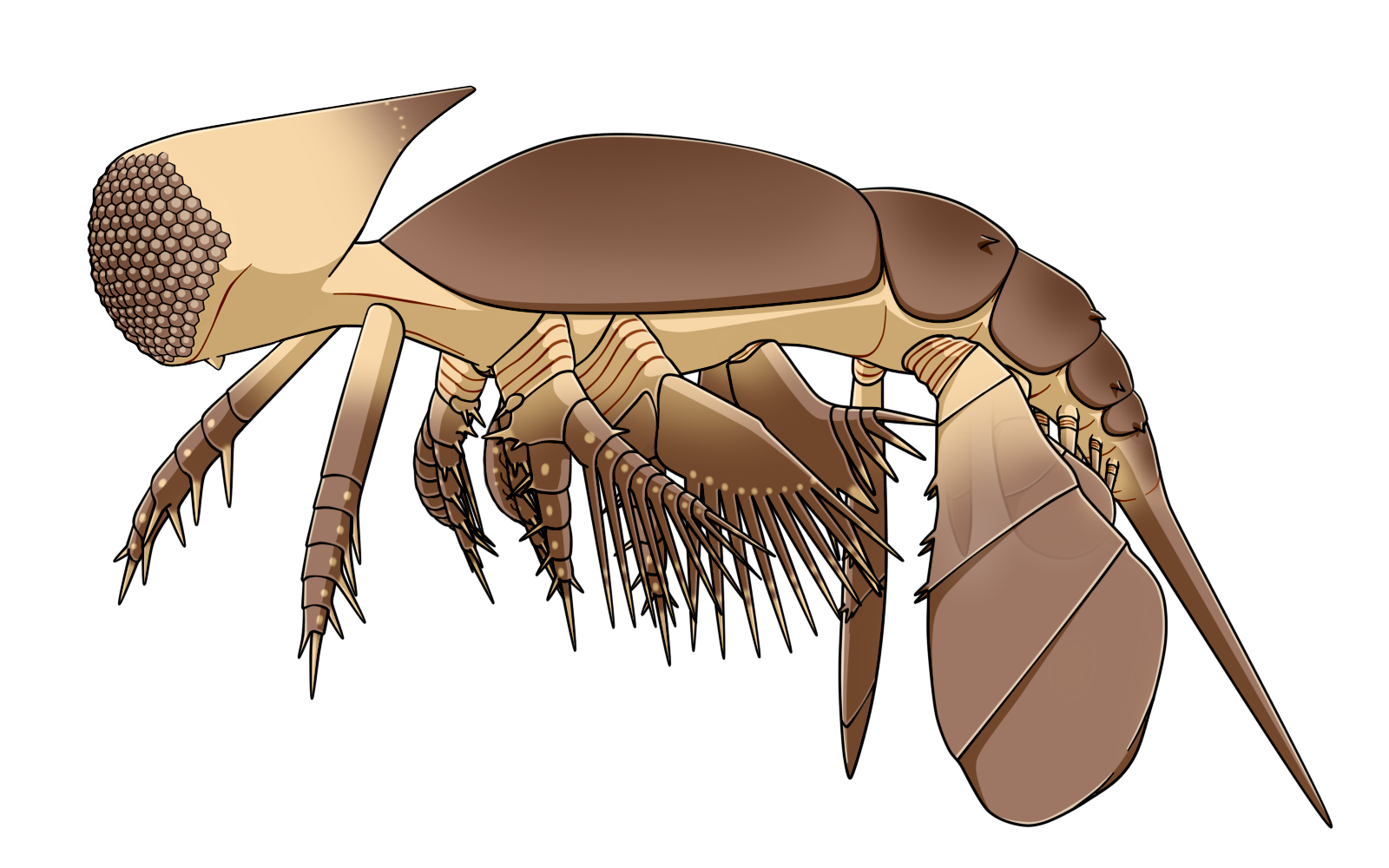
- Reconstruction of Cambropachycope

Scientific classification
- Kingdom: Animalia
- Phylum: Arthropoda
- Family: †Cambropachycopidae
- Genus: †Cambropachycope; Walossek & Müller, 1990
- Species: †C. clarksoni

Binomial name
- †Cambropachycope clarksoni Walossek & Müller, 1990

= Cambropachycope =

Cambropachycope Temporal range: Upper Cambrian

Extinct Cambrian arthropod

Cambropachycope is an extinct genus of enigmatic Cambrian arthropod that includes the single species Cambropachycope clarksoni, known from the Orsten lagerstätten in southern Sweden. It appears to have several apomorphic features, notably including a single large compound eye.

== Etymology ==
The genus name Cambropachycope refers to the large unilobed eye, alongside it originating from the Cambrian period. The specific name clarksoni honours E. N. K. Clarkson.

== Description ==
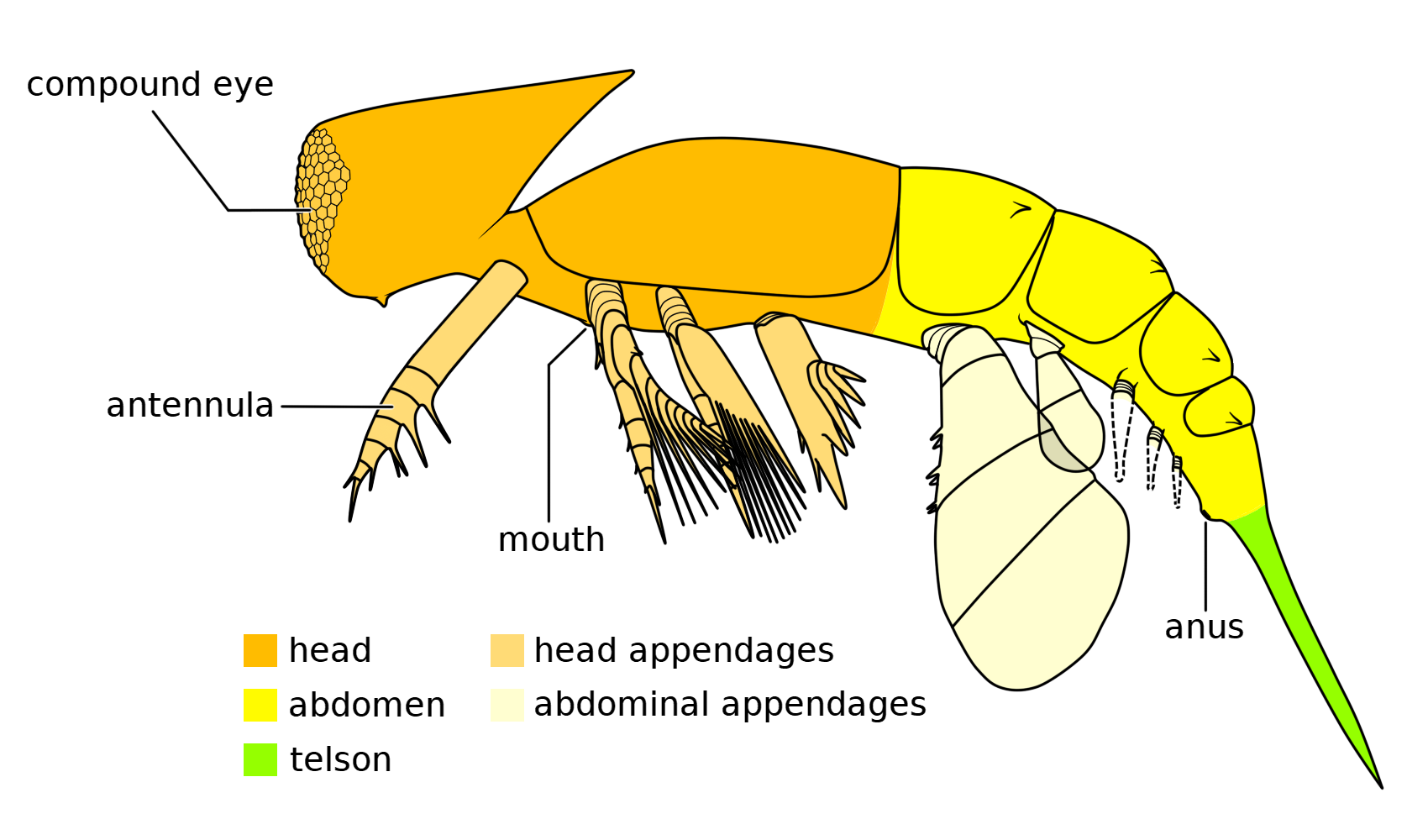
Diagram of Cambropachycope

Size diagram, compared to Goticaris

Originally, Cambropachycope was determined to be approximately 1.5 mm (0.059 in) long based on the specimens known up to that time, however, the discovery of new specimens helped infer the new size to be approximately 4 mm (0.16 in) long (3 mm head and abdomen, and 1 mm telson).

The head of Cambropachycope has an unusual anterior projection that bears a single, large compound eye. The eye structure is well preserved, and shows three layers in the cornea, an outermost and innermost layer of transparent material and a hollow middle layer containing a dark material. This middle layer was probably used for filtering out the blue, scattered light from sunlight. There are four pairs of appendages on its head. The first pair of appendages are treated as antenna, and the other pairs are biramous. The mouth opens on the ventral surface in front of the second pair of appendages. Its abdomen has five segments, but only the first four have a tergite, and all of them have a pair of appendages, the first two being paddle-shaped. Finally there is a telson.

== Ecology ==
According to its eye structure, Cambropachycope was probably a predator.

== Classification ==
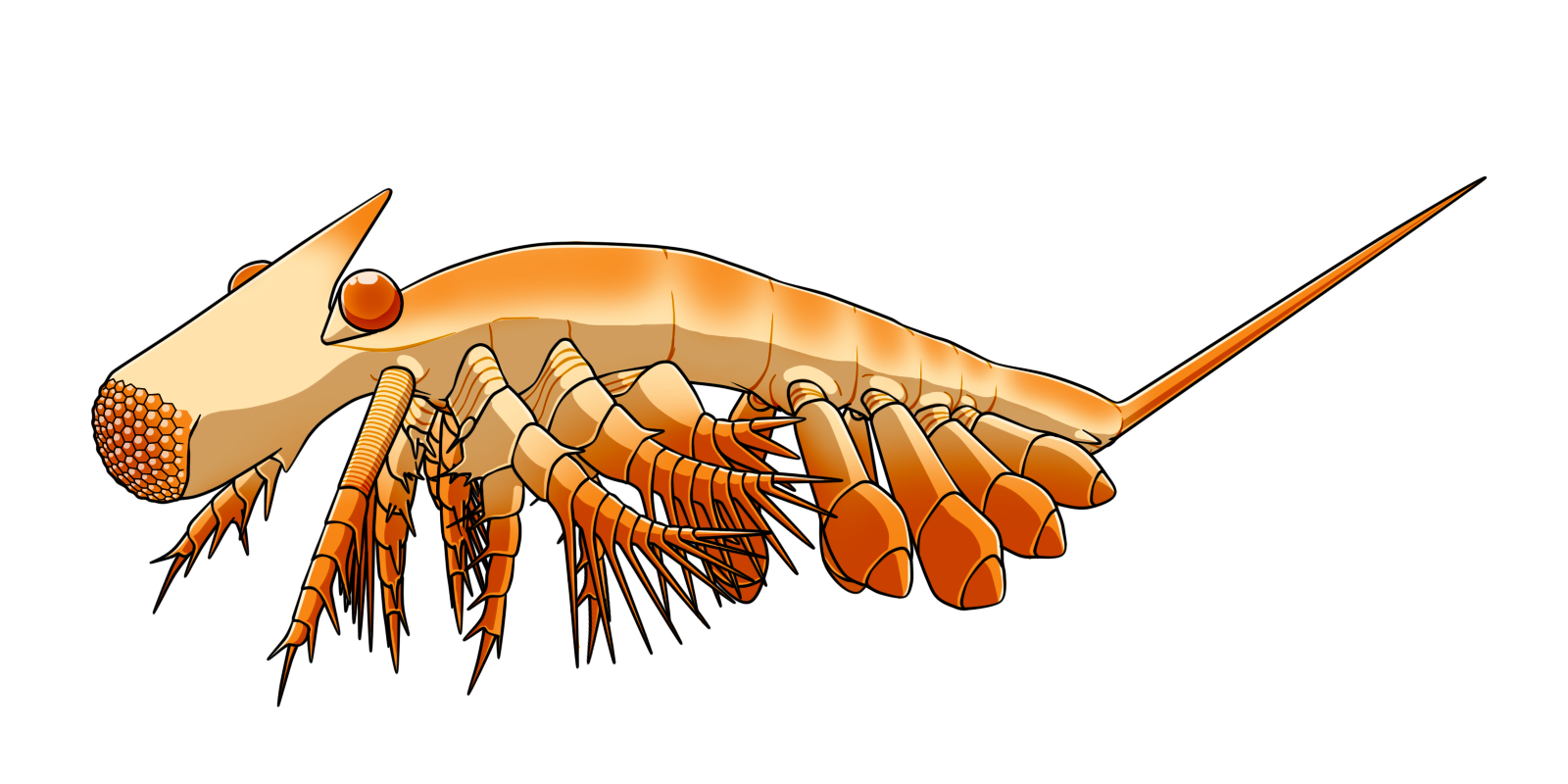
Reconstruction of Goticaris, genus related to Cambropachycope

It is hesitantly presumed to be an early offshoot under the clade Pancrustacea in original description. Other organisms, including Henningsmoenicaris and Martinssonia, also discovered in Orsten, may exist at a similar place on the phylogenetic tree. Collectively, this may have implications for the origins of the crustaceans. However, a later study placed this genus outside Pancrustacea and it was treated only as a stem-group mandibulate.

== See also ==
- Goticaris
- Diplostraca, a group of crustaceans with a single compound eye
  - Evadne, a diplostracan that has been compared to Cambropachycope
