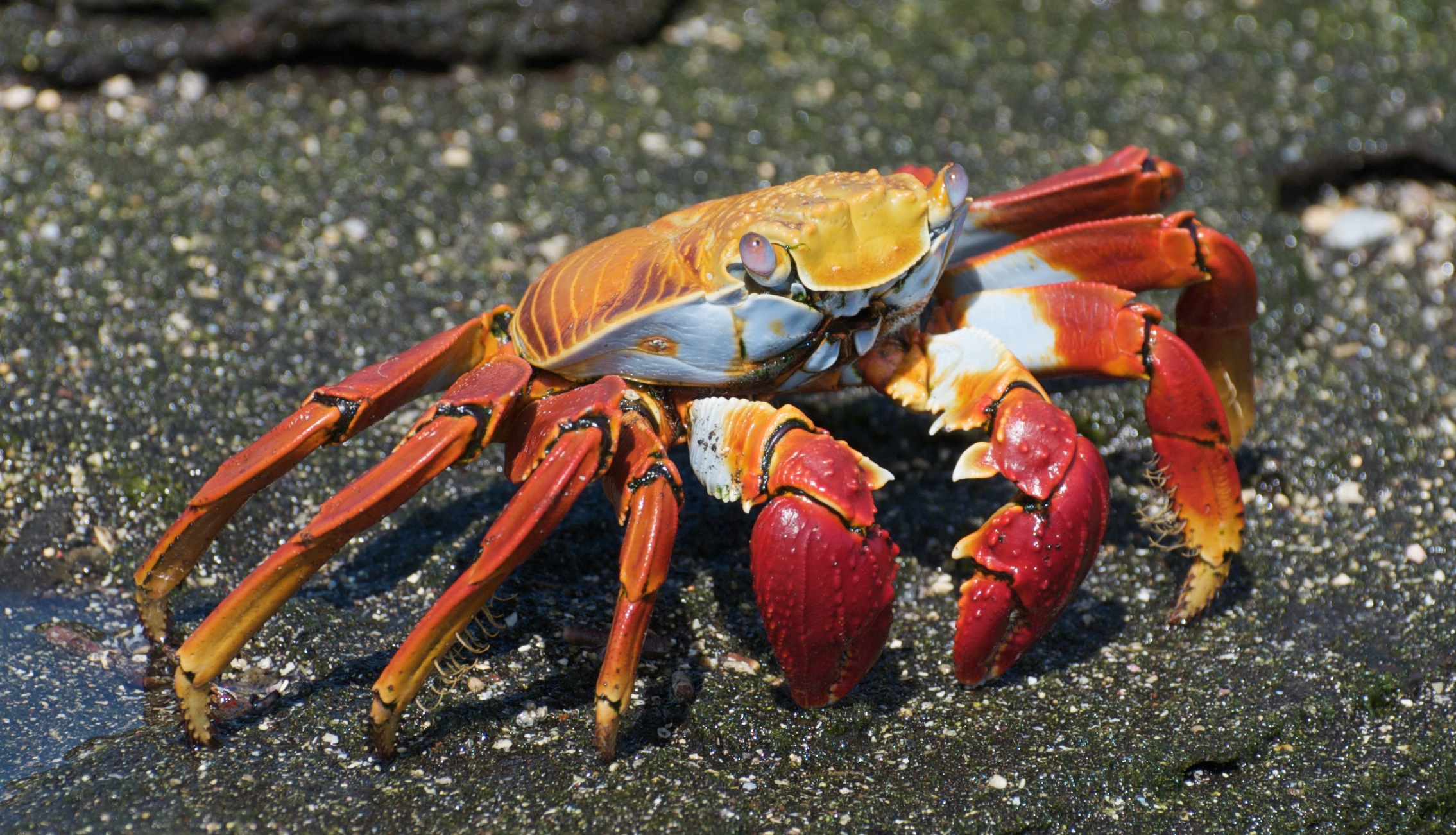
- Sally Lightfoot crab (Grapsus grapsus).
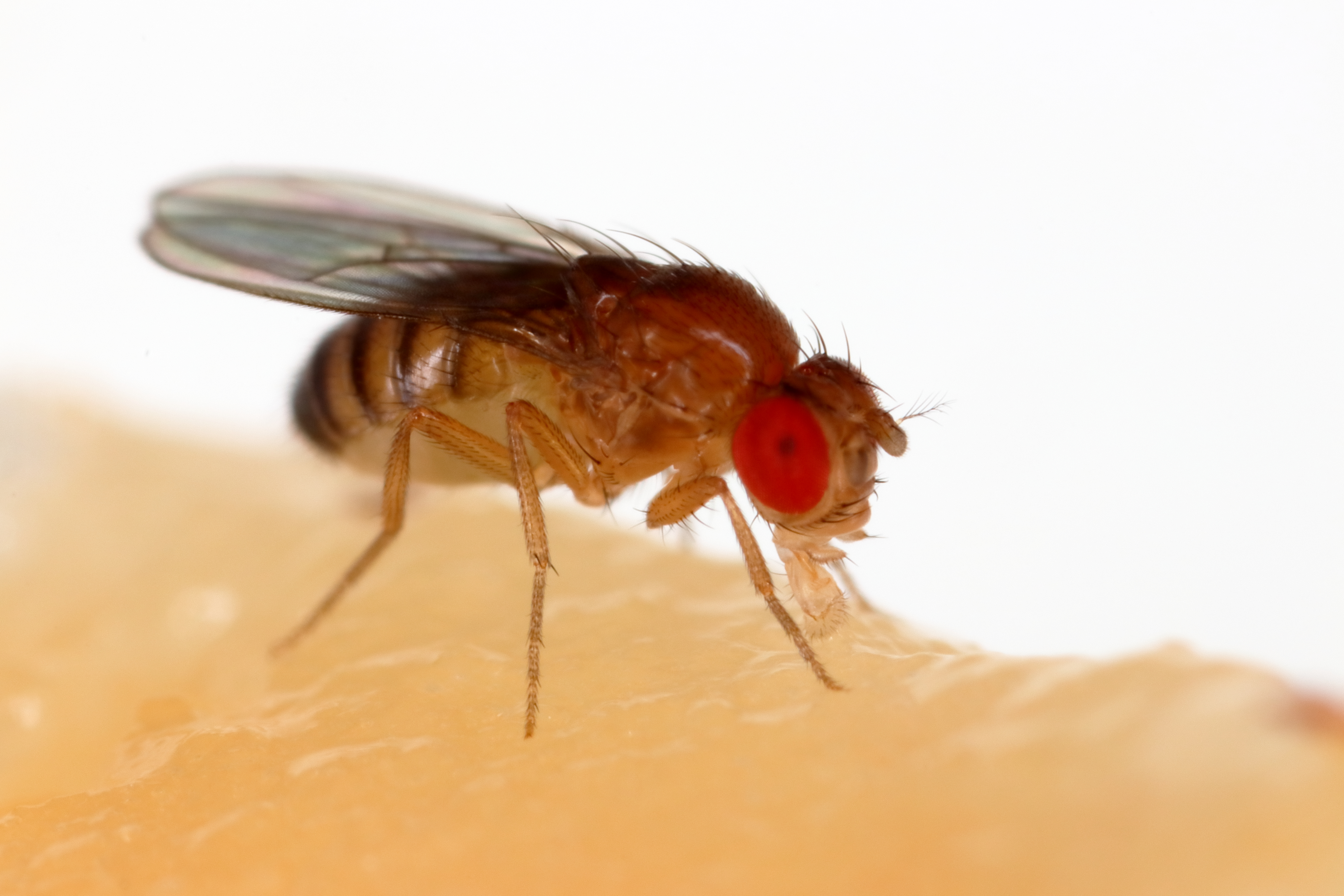
- Fruit fly (Drosophila melanogaster).

Scientific classification
- Kingdom: Animalia
- Phylum: Arthropoda
- Clade: Mandibulata
- Clade: Pancrustacea; Zrzavý & Štys, 1997

Superclasses and extinct orders
- Altocrustacea
  - Allotriocarida (including Hexapoda)
  - Multicrustacea
- Oligostraca
- †Hymenocarina?
- †Phosphatocopina?
- †Thylacocephala?
- †Skaracarida?
- †Sunellidae?
- †Oelandocarididae?
incertae sedis
- †Bredocaris
- †Dala
- †Ercaia
- †Musacaris?
- †Paulinecaris
- †Sandtorpia
- †Wujicaris
- †Martinssonia
- †Yicaris

Synonyms
- Tetraconata Dohle, 2001

= Pancrustacea =

Pancrustacea Temporal range: Cambrian Stage 3–Present

Clade comprising all crustaceans and hexapods

Pancrustacea is a major clade of arthropods that comprises all crustaceans and hexapods (insects and their entognath relatives). This grouping is contrary to the Atelocerata hypothesis, in which Hexapoda and Myriapoda are sister taxa, and Crustacea are only more distantly related. As of 2010, the Pancrustacea taxon was considered well accepted, with most studies recovering Hexapoda within Crustacea. The clade has also been called Tetraconata, referring to having a four-part cone in the ommatidium. The term "Tetraconata" is preferred by some scientists in order to avoid confusion with the use of "pan-" to indicate a clade that includes a crown group and all of its stem group representatives.

== Molecular studies ==
A monophyletic Pancrustacea has been supported by several molecular studies, in most of which the subphylum Crustacea is paraphyletic with regard to hexapods (that is, that hexapods, including insects, are derived from crustacean ancestors). This means that within Pancrustacea, only some members are actually crustaceans, hexapods being the main exception.

The evidence for this clade derives from molecular data and morphological characteristics. The molecular data consists of comparisons of nuclear ribosomal RNA genes, mitochondrial ribosomal RNA genes, and protein coding genes. The morphological data consists of ommatidial structures (see arthropod eye), the presence of neuroblasts, and the form and style of axonogenesis by pioneer neurons.

=== Regier et al. (2005) ===
In a 2005 study of nuclear genomes Regier et al. suggest that Hexapoda is most closely related to Branchiopoda and Cephalocarida + Remipedia, thereby hexapods are "terrestrial crustaceans", thus supporting the Pancrustacea hypothesis that maxillopods are not monophyletic (in the following cladograms Maxillopoda subclasses are highlighted). In addition, there appeared some evidence against the Ostracoda monophyly: that Ostracoda subclass Podocopa may form a clade with Branchiura.

- - Chelicerata
  - Pancrustacea
    - - Ostracoda
      - Branchiura
    - - - Copepoda
        - - Thecostraca and Tantulocarida
          - Malacostraca
      - - - Remipedia
          - Cephalocarida
        - - Branchiopoda
          - Hexapoda

Cladogram following Regier et al. (2005).

=== Regier et al. (2010) ===
A 2010 study of nuclear genomes (Regier et al.) strongly supports Pancrustacea and strongly favour Mandibulata (Myriapoda + Pancrustacea) over Paradoxopoda (Myriapoda + Chelicerata). According to this study, Pancrustacea is divided into four lineages: Oligostraca (Ostracoda, Mystacocarida, Branchiura, Pentastomida), Vericrustacea (Malacostraca, Thecostraca, Copepoda, Branchiopoda), Xenocarida (Cephalocarida, Remipedia) and Hexapoda, with Xenocarida as a sister group to the Hexapoda (comprising "Miracrustacea").

New clades proposed by Regier et al. are:

- Vericrustacea ("true crustaceans")—Branchiopoda, Copepoda, Malacostraca, Thecostraca.
- Multicrustacea ("numerous crustaceans")—Copepoda, Malacostraca, Thecostraca.
- Communostraca ("common shelled ones")—Malacostraca, Thecostraca.
- Miracrustacea ("surprising crustaceans")—Cephalocarida, Remipedia, Hexapoda.
- Xenocarida ("strange shrimp")—Cephalocarida, Remipedia.

Of these proposed clades, only Multicrustacea was confirmed in later molecular studies.

- - Myriapoda
  - Pancrustacea
    - Oligostraca
      - Ostracoda
      - - Ichthyostraca
          - Branchiura
          - Pentastomida
        - Mystacocarida
    - Altocrustacea
      - Vericrustacea
        - Branchiopoda
        - Multicrustacea
          - Copepoda
          - Communostraca
            - Thecostraca
            - Malacostraca
      - Miracrustacea
        - Xenocarida
          - Remipedia
          - Cephalocarida
        - Hexapoda

Cladogram following Regier et al. (2010).

=== von Reumont et al. (2012) ===
In a 2012 molecular study, von Reumont et al. challenge the monophyly of Vericrustacea: they present four versions of Pancrustacea cladogram (figures 1–4), and in all four figures Remipedia is a sister group to Hexapoda, and Branchiopoda is a sister group to (Remipedia + Hexapoda). Thus, their data strongly suggest that Branchiopoda is more closely related to Hexapoda and Remipedia than to Multicrustacea. Based on these data, they propose the following scenario of evolution of Branchiopoda, Remipedia and Hexapoda: under the impact of predatory fishes their common ancestors go to the littoral zone, then ancestors of Branchiopoda go to the ephemeral freshwater habitat, whereas ancestors of Remipedia go to the anchialine cave, and ancestors of Hexapoda go to the land.

Figures 1 and 3

- - Chelicerata
  - Pancrustacea
    - Ostracoda
    - - - Copepoda
        - - Thecostraca and Tantulocarida
          - Malacostraca
      - - Branchiopoda
        - - Remipedia
          - Hexapoda

Cladogram following von Reumont et al. (2012), figures 1 and 3.

Figure 2

- - Chelicerata
  - Pancrustacea
    - - Ostracoda
      - - - Copepoda
          - Thecostraca and Tantulocarida
        - Malacostraca
    - - Branchiopoda
      - - Remipedia
        - Hexapoda

Cladogram following von Reumont et al. (2012), figure 2.

Figure 4

- - Chelicerata
  - Pancrustacea
    - Ostracoda
    - - - - Copepoda
          - Thecostraca and Tantulocarida
        - Malacostraca
      - - Branchiopoda
        - - Remipedia
          - Hexapoda

Cladogram following von Reumont et al. (2012), figure 4.

=== Jondeung et al. (2012) ===
Another molecular study (of mitochondrial genomes), conducted in 2012 by Jondeung et al., strongly support monophyletic Pancrustacea and places Malacostraca + Entomostraca and Branchiopoda as the sister clade to Hexapoda and places Cirripedia + Remipedia as sister to the rest of Pancrustacea.

=== Oakley et al. (2013) ===
In 2013 combined study of morphology, including fossils, and molecular data, including expressed sequence tag, mitochondrial genome, nuclear genome, and ribosomal DNA data, Oakley et al. obtained support for three pancrustacean clades: Oligostraca (Ostracoda, Mystacocarida, Branchiura, Pentastomida), Multicrustacea (Copepoda, Thecostraca, Malacostraca) and a clade they refer to as Allotriocarida (Branchiopoda, Cephalocarida, Remipedia, Hexapoda), as well as for monophyly of Ostracoda. Within Multicrustacea they obtained support for a clade they suggest the name Hexanauplia: Thecostraca + Copepoda. Relations within Allotriocarida remain uncertain: sister taxon to Hexapoda is either Remipedia, or the clade Branchiopoda + Cephalocarida, however, authors are inclined to the first version (see "Conclusion", 4), which is also consistent with von Reumont et al. (2012) results.

New proposed by Oakley et al. clades are:

- Hexanauplia (refers to six ("hexa-") naupliar molts)—Copepoda, Thecostraca.
- Allotriocarida ("allotrios" is "strange", "carida" is "shrimp")—Cephalocarida, Branchiopoda, Remipedia, Hexapoda.

Note: the Allotriocarida clade was also recovered in 2005 by Regier et al. as Clade #33, but relations within it were different, and they did not choose a name for it.

- - Chelicerata
  - - Myriapoda
    - - Pancrustacea
        - Oligostraca
          - Ostracoda
          - Ichthyostraca
            - Mystacocarida
            - - Pentastomida
              - Branchiura
        - - Multicrustacea
            - Malacostraca
            - Hexanauplia
              - Copepoda
              - Thecostraca
          - Allotriocarida
            - - Cephalocarida
              - Branchiopoda
            - - Remipedia
              - Hexapoda

Cladogram following Oakley et al. (2013)

=== Rota-Stabelli et al. (2013) ===
In 2013 Rota-Stabelli et al. used the signal in the 62 protein-coding genes assembled by Regier et al. in 2010 to improve the knowledge of the internal relationship in the Pancrustacea group. This data set infers a highly supported nucleotide tree that is substantially different from the corresponding, but poorly supported, amino acid one. The discrepancy between the nucleotide-based and the amino acids-based trees is caused by substitutions within synonymous codon families (especially those of serine-TCN and AGY): different arthropod lineages are differentially biased in their usage of serine, arginine, and leucine synonymous codons, and the serine bias is correlated with the topology derived from the nucleotides, but not the amino acids. The authors suggest that a parallel, partially compositionally driven, synonymous codon-usage bias affects the nucleotide topology. As substitutions between serine codon families can proceed through threonine or cysteine intermediates, amino acid data sets might also be affected by the serine codon-usage bias. The analyses suggests that a Dayhoff recoding strategy would partially ameliorate the effects of such bias. Although amino acids provide an alternative hypothesis of pancrustacean relationships, neither the nucleotides nor the amino acids version of this data set bring enough genuine phylogenetic information to robustly resolve the relationships within group, which should still be considered unresolved. However the amino acid tree seems to be more likely since it appears to be free from the synonymous codon-family bias affecting the nucleotide one. Most of the inferences based on amino acids sequences support a clade which includes Branchiopoda, Remipedia, Copepoda and Hexapoda (group A). Using the best amino acids substitution model, CATGTR, also Cephalocarida falls inside this group. In all the analyses group A (with or without Cephalocarida) is sister-group of a clade composed by Malacostraca, Oligostraca and Thecostraca (group B).

The following diagram shows the tree resulting from the Dayhoff recoding.

- .Mandibulata
  - Pancrustacea
    - .
      - .
        Hexapoda
      - .
        Branchiopoda
      - .
        Remipedia
      - .
        Copepoda
    - .
      - .
        - .
          - .
            Thecostraca and Tantulocarida
          - .
            Malacostraca
        - .
          Oligostraca
      - .
        Cephalocarida
  - .
    Myriapoda

=== Schwentner et al. (2017) ===
In a 2017 molecular study, Schwentner et al. proposed a new taxon Labiocarida (derived from "labium" [Latin: lip] and "carida" [Greek: prawn]) for the clade comprising Hexapoda and Remipedia based on the presence of the functional labium in both taxa, which is consistent with other studies. The study also supports a group including Copepoda and Malacostraca in Multicrustacea.

=== Lozano-Fernandez et al. (2019) ===
In 2019, similar to previous studies, such as Oakley et al. (2013) and Schwentner et al. (2017), Lozano-Fernandez et al. divided Pancrustacea into Allotriocarida, along with Oligostraca and Multicrustacea, as the three main divisions of subphylum Pancrustacea, embracing the traditional crustaceans and the hexapods (including insects). Lozano-Fernandez et al. also proposed a new group Athalassocarida for the Labiocarida plus Branchiopoda clade (derived from "Athalasso" [Greek: nonmarine] and "carida" [Greek: prawn]), thereby referring to a grouping of pancrustaceans where all extant members either live in nonmarine settings or reverted to a marine life-style secondarily.

- - Myriapoda
  - Pancrustacea
    - Oligostraca
    - Altocrustacea
      - Multicrustacea
        - Hexanauplia
          - Thecostraca
          - Copepoda
        - Malacostraca
      - Allotriocarida
        - Cephalocarida
        - Athalassocarida
          - Branchiopoda
          - Labiocarida
            - Remipedia
            - Hexapoda
              - Protura
              - - - Diplura
                  - Collembola
                - Insecta

Cladogram following Lozano-Fernandez et al. (2019).

=== Bernot et al. (2023) ===
In recent study, Bernot et al. placed Copepoda as a sister group to Branchiopoda in Allotriocarida, which result in the recovery of clade Communostraca. Multicrustacea was not found. There are some major changes within class Malacostraca.

- - Myriapoda
  - Pancrustacea
    - Oligostraca
    - Altocrustacea
      - Communostraca
        - Thecostraca
        - Malacostraca
      - Allotriocarida
        - Cephalocarida
        - - - Branchiopoda
            - Copepoda
          - Labiocarida
            - Remipedia
            - Hexapoda

=== Position of Tantulocarida ===
According to Petrunina A.S. and Kolbasov G.A., the sixth subclass of Maxillopoda Tantulocarida may lie within Thecostraca, forming a clade with thecostracan infraclass Cirripedia (if so, Thecostraca excluding Tantulocarida is paraphyletic):

- Thecostraca and Tantulocarida
  - - Facetotecta (Thecostraca)
    - Ascothoracida (Thecostraca)
  - - Tantulocarida
    - Cirripedia (Thecostraca)

Thecostraca cladogram following Petrunina (2012), page 19, picture 8

== See also ==
- Crustaceomorpha
- Mandibulata
