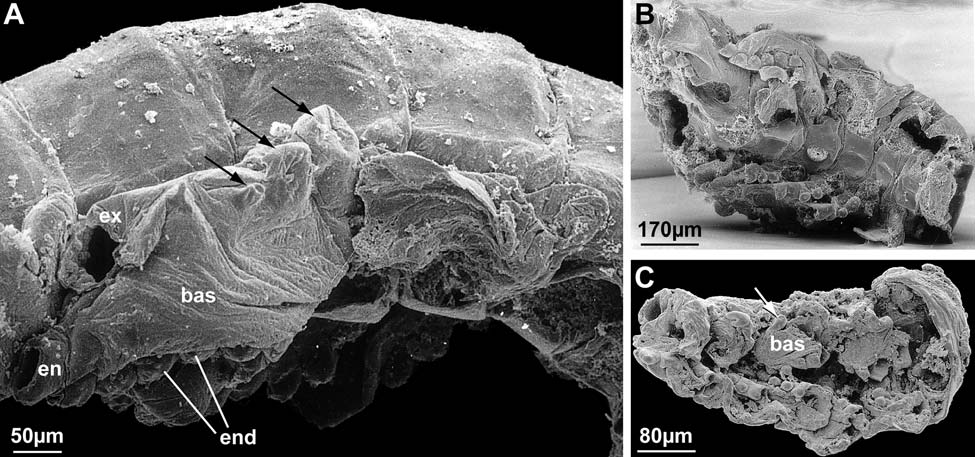
- Fossils of Paulinecaris

Scientific classification
- Kingdom: Animalia
- Phylum: Arthropoda
- Clade: Pancrustacea
- Genus: †Paulinecaris; Waloszek et al, 2014
- Species: †P. siveterae

Binomial name
- †Paulinecaris siveterae Waloszek et al, 2014

= Paulinecaris =

Paulinecaris Temporal range: Late Cambrian

Extinct genus of crustacean

Paulinecaris is a genus of crustacean from the Orsten of Sweden. It contains one species, Paulinecaris siveterae.

== Description ==
Paulinecaris is known from two fragmentary specimens: one preserving the rear part of the head and some of the trunk, and the other being purely the trunk. Due to how fragmentary these are, the exact appendages preserved are unclear. However, a half-circular pore behind the first head appendage is interpreted as a maxillary excretory pore (the first record of such in Orsten fossils), and this appendage therefore is a maxilla. The maxillary segment is otherwise identical to the trunk segments. These segments bear rectangular tergites, with their measurements increasing up to around 400 micrometers long and 200 micrometers wide/tall at the fifth thoracomere and decreasing thereafter. These tergites are smooth throughout and do not seem to bear any structures such as hairs. The margins of the tergites smoothly merge with the body, without a tergopleura. Each tergite is separated by narrow membranes. The sternites are split down the middle by a narrow furrow, with the rest of their surface smooth. The trunk limbs insert abaxially in membranous sockets, and extend ventrolaterally from the body. The posterior portion of the body is unknown, however it was likely narrower than the preserved part. The terminal portion of the last preserved segment shows a large hole in the center, likely the gut. In addition, fine parallel stripes may represent muscle fibres.

=== Limbs ===
The basipods appear thin and C-curved in anteroposterior aspect, with their anterior side more strongly sclerotized as evidenced by furrows on the posterior side. The proximal endite is round and ovoid, with two spine-like setae on its median side and a row of ten to eleven setae near the posterior. The first two basipodal endites are similar, but more teardrop-shaped and with fewer setae. The next basipodal endites are more trapezoidal in shape, with still fewer setae. The more posterior limbs have fewer setae on each endite than the rest. The endopods are fragmentary, although it is presumed that they are likely multi-segmented. The segments preserved seem quite similar to those of the basipod, although with a more distinct central spine. The exopods are not preserved at all, only known from an oval insertion on the lateral side of one basipod. In contrast, the epipods are quite fully known. Three lobe-like structures are interpreted as epipods, with the most proximal being rather loaf-shaped, and the most distal being half its size and looking more like a fingertip. These lobes seem to lack setae or ornaments.

== Classification ==
Paulinecaris is tentatively assigned to Entomostraca due to the morphology of its maxillae and other appendages, possibly close to Yicaris and cephalocarids, however Entomostraca is a paraphyletic clade and therefore its position in Pancrustacea is uncertain.

== Etymology ==
The full binomial name, Paulinecaris siveterae, honours the late Pauline Siveter, the wife of David Siveter. The genus name also include the word caris, a common suffix for fossil arthropods.
