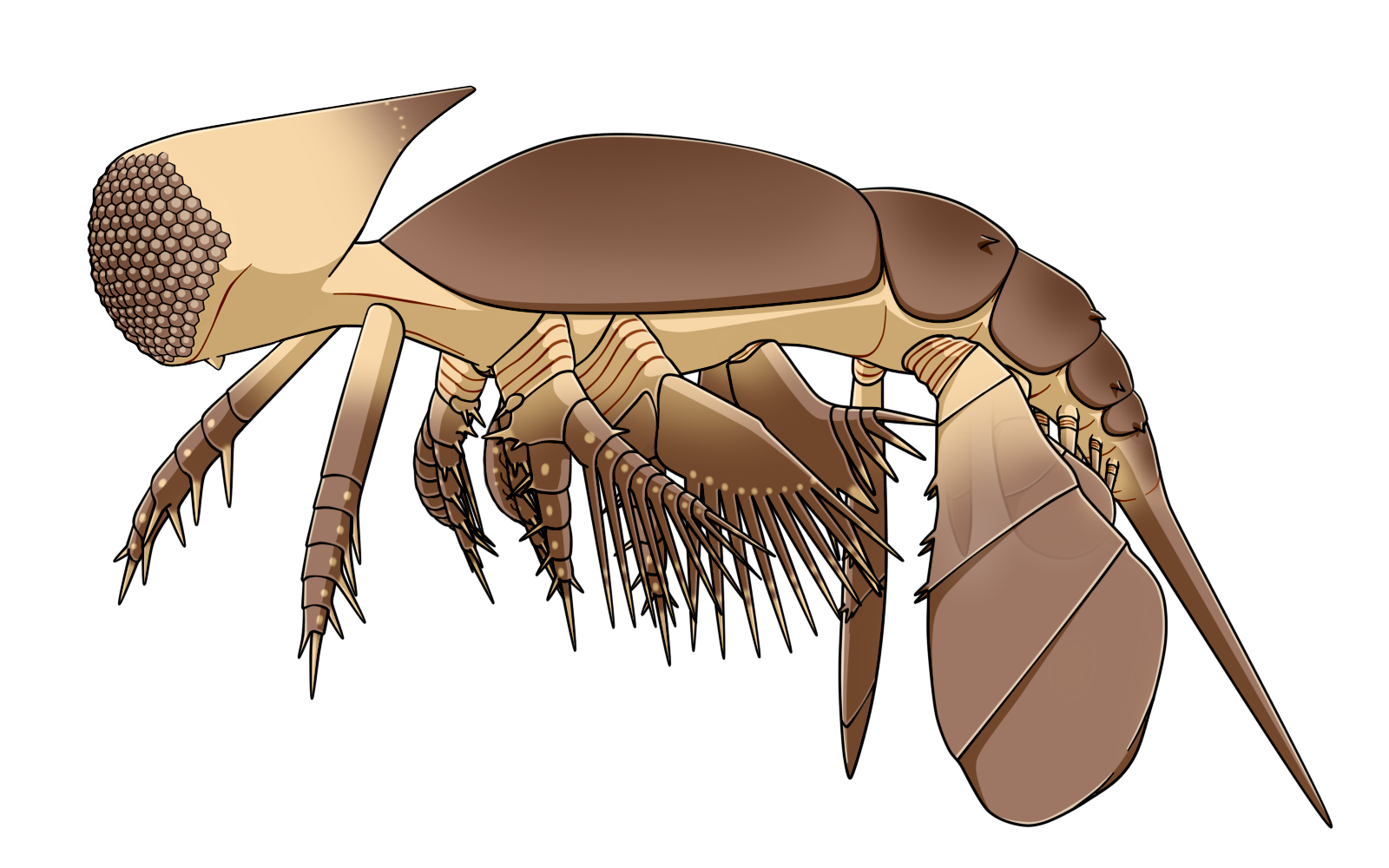
- Reconstruction of Cambropachycope

Scientific classification
- Kingdom: Animalia
- Phylum: Arthropoda
- Family: †Cambropachycopidae; Walossek and Müller, 1990

Genera
- †Cambropachycope; †Goticaris

= Cambropachycopidae =

Cambropachycopidae Temporal range: Upper Cambrian

Extinct family of Cambrian arthropods

Cambropachycopidae is a family of Cambrian arthropods known from the Orsten of Sweden, united by their singular, large compound eye and heavily enlarged cephalic segment. Both species were roughly a millimeter long with similar body structures, however Goticaris is distinguished by two stalked blisters near its eye, as well as a longer body and smaller eye than Cambropachycope. They are suggested to be stem-group mandibulates.
