= Orsten =

Cambrian strata

- Stratigraphic range: Miaolingian–Furongian
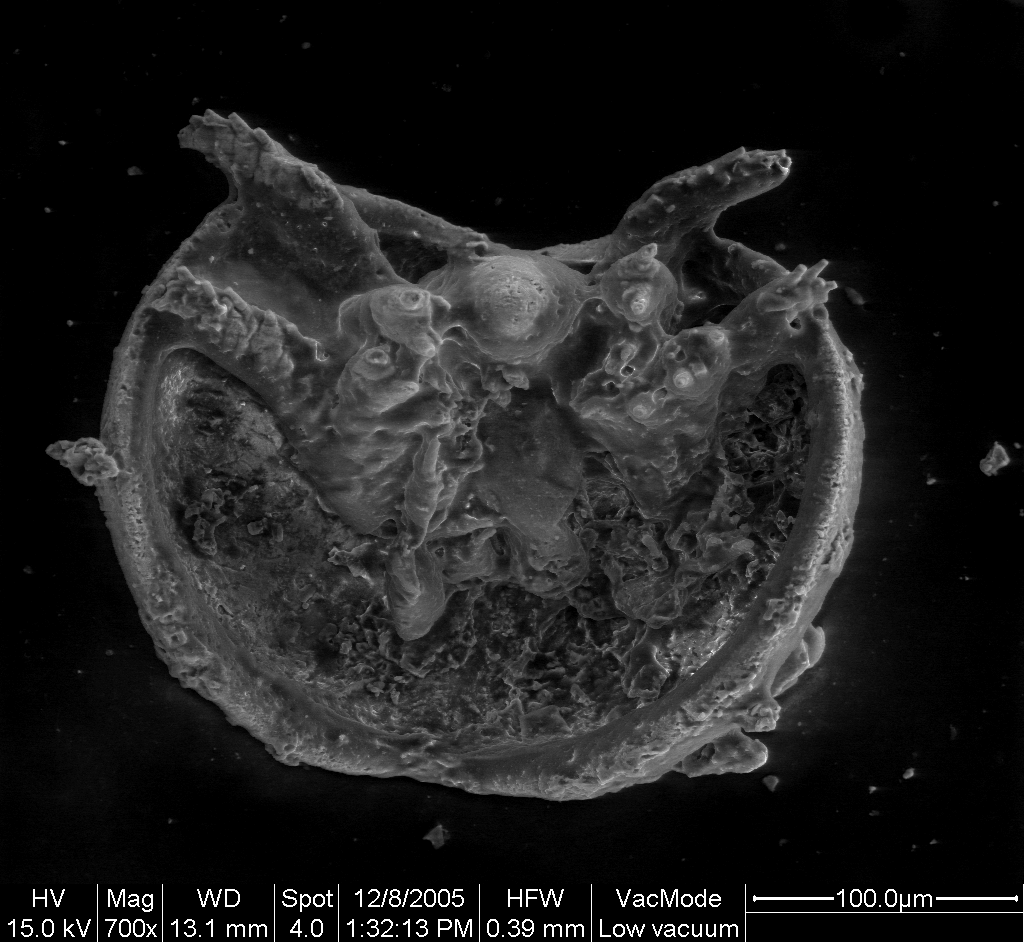
- Hesslandona angustata, a phosphatocopine, showing exceptional preservation in 3D
- Type: Geological formation
- Unit of: Alum Shale Formation

Lithology
- Primary: Shale and limestone

Location
- Region: Kinnekulle and island of Öland
- Country: Sweden

Type section
- Named for: Orsten (Note: Orsten means "stinking stone": the alum shale matrix is rich in organics.)
- Named by: Klaus J. Müller, 1975

The Orsten fauna are fossilized organisms preserved in the Orsten lagerstätte of Cambrian (Late Miaolingian to Furongian) rocks, notably at Kinnekulle and on the island of Öland, all in Sweden.

The initial site, discovered in 1975 by Klaus Müller and his assistants, exceptionally preserves soft-bodied organisms, and their larvae, who are preserved uncompacted in three dimensions. The fossils are phosphatized and silicified, thus the delicate chitinous cuticle and soft parts are not affected by acids, which act upon the limestone nodules within which the fossils have survived. Acids dissolve the limestone, revealing the microfossils in a recovery process called "acid etching". To recover the fossils, more than one and a half tons of Orsten limestone have been dissolved in acid, originally in a specifically designed laboratory in Bonn; more recently moved to Ulm. The insoluble residue is scanned by electron microscope. The phosphorus that replaced the fossils with calcium phosphate is presumed to have derived from fecal pellets.

The Orsten fauna has improved the understanding of metazoan phylogeny and evolution, particularly among the arthropods, thanks in part to unique preservation of larval stages. The Orsten sites reveals the oldest well-documented benthic meiofauna in the fossil record. For the first time, fossils of tardigrades ("water bears") and apparently free-living pentastomids have been found.

The Cambrian strata consist of alum shales with limestone nodules (the Alum Shale Formation), which are interpreted as the products of an oxygen-depleted ("dysoxic") (Note: The distribution of pyrites in the limestone, together with the organic content indicate levels of oxygen that prevented normal decomposition.) marine bottom water habitat of a possibly offshore seashelf at depths of perhaps 50–100 m. The bottom was rich in organic detritus, forming a soft muddy zone with floc in its surface layer.

Other Orsten-type preservation fauna have been found in Nevada, eastern Canada, England, Poland, Siberia, China and the Northern Territory of Australia.

== Paleobiota ==
Based on data from C.O.R.E. website and subsequent studies.

Animals
Genus	Notes	Images
Agnostus	An agnostid	
Cambropycnogon	A larval sea spider	
Cambropachycope	A monocular arthropod of uncertain affinities, possibly placed in stem-Mandibulata	
Goticaris	A monocular arthropod of uncertain affinities, possibly placed in stem-Mandibulata	
Rehbachiella	A pancrustacean	
Martinssonia	A pancrustacean	
Dala	A pancrustacean	
Musacaris	A pancrustacean	
Bredocaris	A pancrustacean	
Paulinecaris	A pancrustacean	
Skara	A pancrustacean	
Sandtorpia	A pancrustacean	
Henningsmoenicaris	A pancrustacean	
Walossekia	A pancrustacean	
Aengapentastomum	A pentastomid parasitic crustacean	
Boeckelericambria	A pentastomid parasitic crustacean	
Heymonsicambria	A pentastomid parasitic crustacean	
Haffnericambria	A pentastomid parasitic crustacean	
Oelandocaris	A stem-group crustacean or stem-group mandibulate or megacheiran	
Hesslandona	A bivalved arthropod belonging to Phosphatocopina	
Trapezilites	A bivalved arthropod belonging to Phosphatocopina	
Waldoria	A bivalved arthropod belonging to Phosphatocopina	
Veldotron	A bivalved arthropod belonging to Phosphatocopina	
Falites	A bivalved arthropod belonging to Phosphatocopina	
Vestrogothia	A bivalved arthropod belonging to Phosphatocopina	
Orstenotubulus	A lobopodian	
Arthropoda indet.	Several nauplius-like larvae that cannot be associated with any of the other arthropods. The various larvae have been termed A1, A2, B and C. Formerly included among them was "larva D", now Cambropycnogon.	

=== Orsten-type fauna found elsewhere ===
Animals
Genus	Notes	Images
Skara	Two additional species known from Poland and China	
Heymonsicambria	One additional species known from Ordovician of Canada	
Vestrogothia	Two additional species known from China	
Markuelia	A possible member of Cycloneuralia, known from Australia	
Shergoldana	A possible member of Cycloneuralia, known from Australia	
Tritonychus	A lobopodian known from China	
Dietericambria	A pentastomid known from Greenland	
Orstenoloricus	A loriciferan larva from Australia	
Austromarrella	A marrellomorph from Australia	
Cambrocaris	A crustacean, known only from Poland	
Unnamed tardigrade	Only known from Siberia	
Wujicaris	A pancrustacean known from China	
Yicaris	A pancrustacean known from China	
Dabashanella	A member of Phosphatocopina from China	
Klausmuelleria	A member of Phosphatocopina from England	
