= Oelandocarididae =

Oelandocarididae Temporal range: Upper Cambrian

Scientific classification
- Domain: Eukaryota
- Kingdom: Animalia
- Phylum: Arthropoda
- Family: †Oelandocarididae; Haug, Maas & Waloszek, 2009

Genera
- †Henningsmoenicaris; †Sandtorpia; †Oelandocaris

Extinct family of arthropods

Oelandocarididae is a proposed extinct family of Cambrian arthropods from the Orsten of Sweden that includes Oelandocaris, Sandtorpia and Henningsmoenicaris.
