= Wujicaris =

Wujicaris Temporal range: Early Cambrian, 518 Ma

Scientific classification
- Domain: Eukaryota
- Kingdom: Animalia
- Phylum: Arthropoda
- Clade: Mandibulata
- Clade: Pancrustacea
- Genus: †Wujicaris; Zhang et al, 2010
- Species: †W. muelleri

Binomial name
- †Wujicaris muelleri Zhang et al, 2010

Extinct genus of crustacean

Wujicaris is an extinct genus of Early Cambrian crustaceans from the Maotianshan Shales of China. The genus contains a single species, Wujicaris muelleri.

== Description ==
Wujicaris is a crustacean known from the Chengjiang Lagerstatte, uniquely fossilised in Orsten-type preservation and known from four larval specimens in the early metanauplius stage roughly 270 μm long. It and the possibly related taxon Yicaris both heavily resemble the metanaupli of modern crustaceans such as barnacles, thus possibly suggesting the existence of Thecostraca during the Cambrian. Wujicaris possesses a large, pointed cephalic shield with an oval structure tentatively dubbed the "dorsal organ", a pair of possibly median eyes, an unsegmented body along with five pairs of appendages, three of those being mouthparts and the other two being antennae. In addition, the labrum and hypostome are fused together, forming a large complex near the front of the organism.

== Etymology ==
Wujicaris derives from the town of Wuji, along with the word caris, meaning "shrimp". The specific name, muelleri honours the late Klaus Müller, discoverer of Orsten-type preservation.
