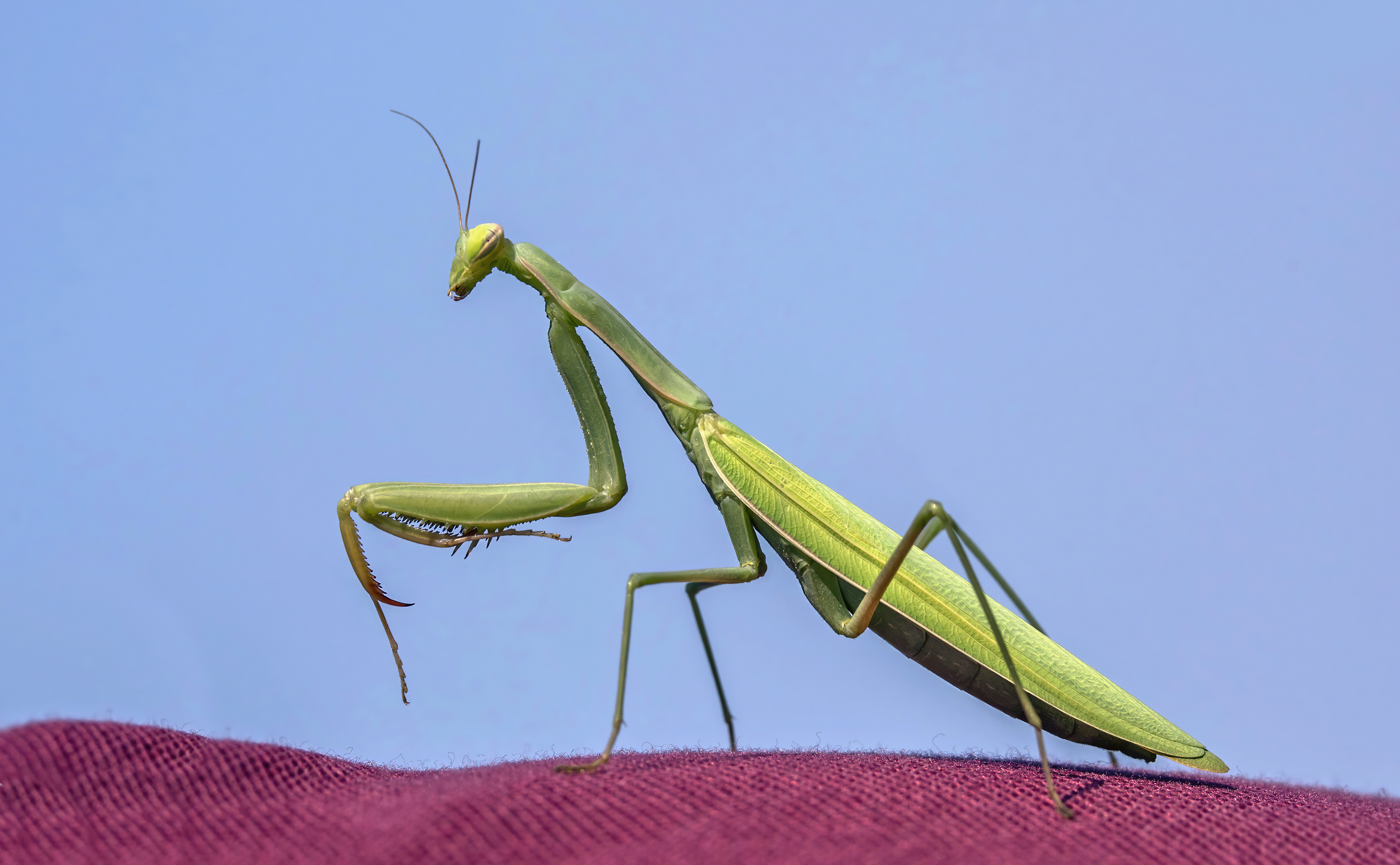
- Mantis religiosa, a hexapod
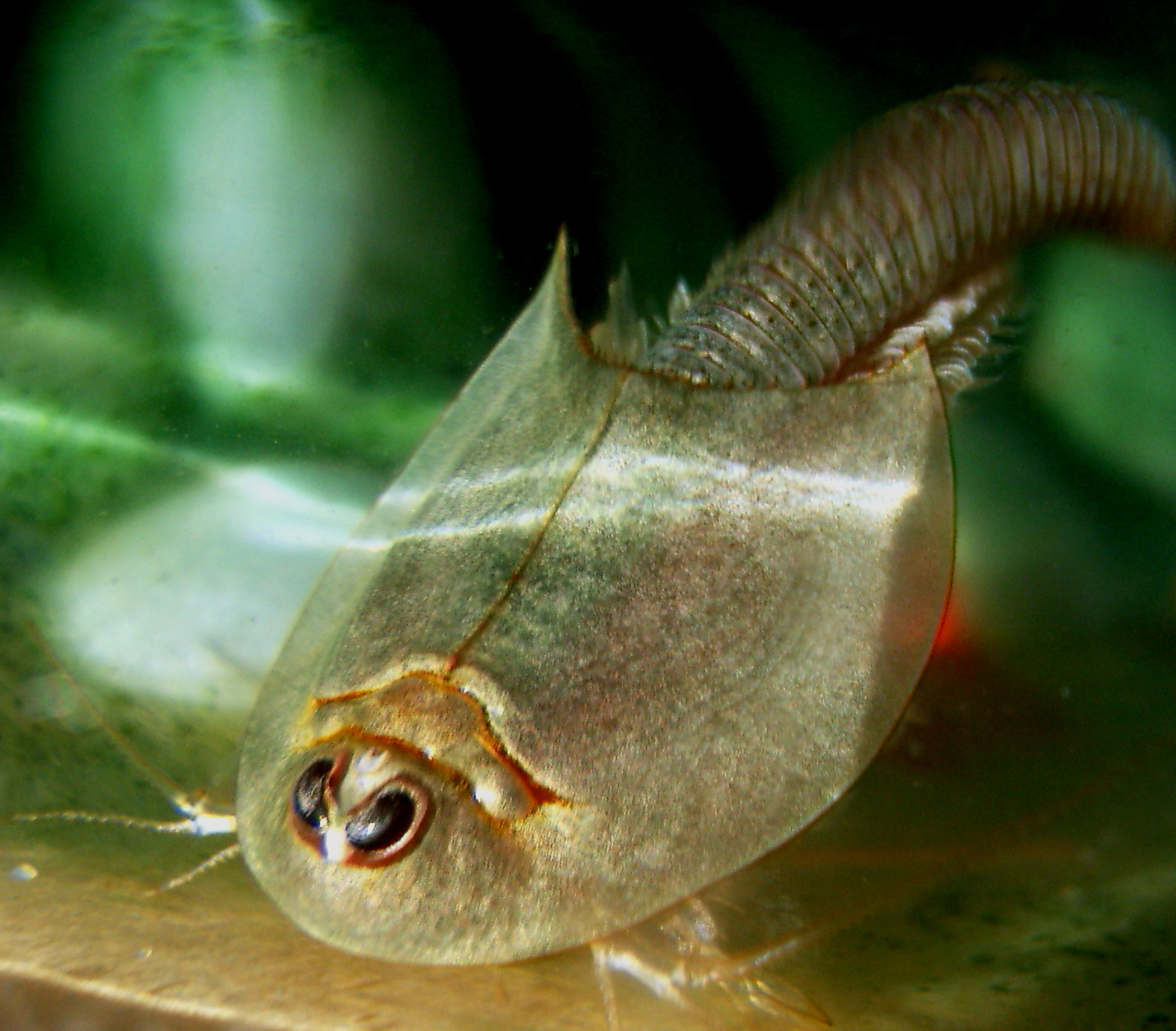
- Triops longicaudatus, a branchiopod

Scientific classification
- Kingdom: Animalia
- Phylum: Arthropoda
- Clade: Pancrustacea
- Clade: Allotriocarida; Oakley et al., 2013

Subphyla and classes
- Cephalocarida; Athalassocarida; Branchiopoda; Labiocarida; Hexapoda; Remipedia

= Allotriocarida =

Allotriocarida Temporal range: Upper Cambrian 497–0 Ma

Superclass of arthropods

Allotriocarida (from classical Greek ἀλλότριος/allotrios 'different, foreign' and καρίς/karis 'shrimp, crustacean') is a clade of Pancrustacea, containing Hexapoda (all insects, springtails & their close relatives) and three crustacean classes: Remipedia (blind, venomous crustaceans), Cephalocarida (translucent aquatic detrivores), and Branchiopoda (freshwater, non-decapod 'shrimp'). One study also found the Copepoda to be part of Allotriocarida.

Allotriocarida is one of three major clades within Pancrustacea, being most closely related to its sister clade Multicrustacea (crabs, lobsters, barnacles, etc.), and more distantly related to the superclass Oligostraca (seed shrimp, fish lice, and tongue worms).

== History ==
The idea of hexapods being 'terrestrial crustaceans' is relatively recent, coming from a 2005 molecular analysis study.

A 2013 study restructured the relationships within Pancrustacea, and first proposed the name Allotriocarida.

The most recent study of Allotriocarida in 2019 provides additional evidence suggesting that Hexapoda and Remipedia are likely more closely related to each other than to Cephalocarida or Branchiopoda.

As of 2024, the existence of Allotriocarida as a monophyletic group within Pancrustacea is now much more widely accepted than the Atelocerata classification which dates back to the 19th century. This formerly-held belief was that hexapods and myriapods (centipedes, millipedes, etc.) are more closely related to each other than they are to the Multicrustacea, based on morphological similarities in their tracheae, but this proposition has been contradicted by the aforementioned modern molecular phylogenetic studies. The most recent understanding of Allotriocarida, as described in the 2019 study, can be seen in the cladogram below.

- Allotriocarida
  - Cephalocarida
  - - Branchiopoda
    - - Remipedia
      - Hexapoda
        - Protura
        - - - Diplura
            - Collembola
          - Insecta
