= Dala (crustacean) =

Dala Temporal range: Upper Cambrian

Scientific classification
- Domain: Eukaryota
- Kingdom: Animalia
- Phylum: Arthropoda
- Clade: Mandibulata
- Clade: Pancrustacea
- Genus: †Dala; Müller, 1983
- Species: †D. peilertae

Binomial name
- †Dala peilertae Müller, 1983

Extinct genus of crustacean

Dala is an extinct genus of pancrustaceans from the Cambrian Orsten. The genus contains a single species, Dala peilertae.

== Description ==
Dala is estimated to be around 2 millimetres long extrapolating from partial specimens, with no preserved head in the holotype and only a fragmentary one in the paratype. It has eight pairs of thoracic appendages forming a filter apparatus, four pairs of cephalic appendages, a large labrum and five ring-shaped abdominal segments, alongside a long furca on the posteriormost segment. Two different size groups of Dala have been identified, although no currently known larvae have been found. A relationship to Cephalocarida was briefly suggested, but Dala is currently labelled as Pancrustacea incertae sedis.

== Etymology ==
Dala is named for the parish of Dala 2 km west-northwest of the discovery site. Its specific name peilertae honours Mrs. Christa Peilert "on the occasion of her retirement after 14 years (1966 03 15-1980 07 31) as a technical assistant in the Bonn department".

== Distribution ==
Dala is known from over 60 fragmentary specimens, seemingly due to the whole organism being too large for complete preservation, all from Västergötland in between the parishes of Stenstorp and the genus's namesake of Dala.
