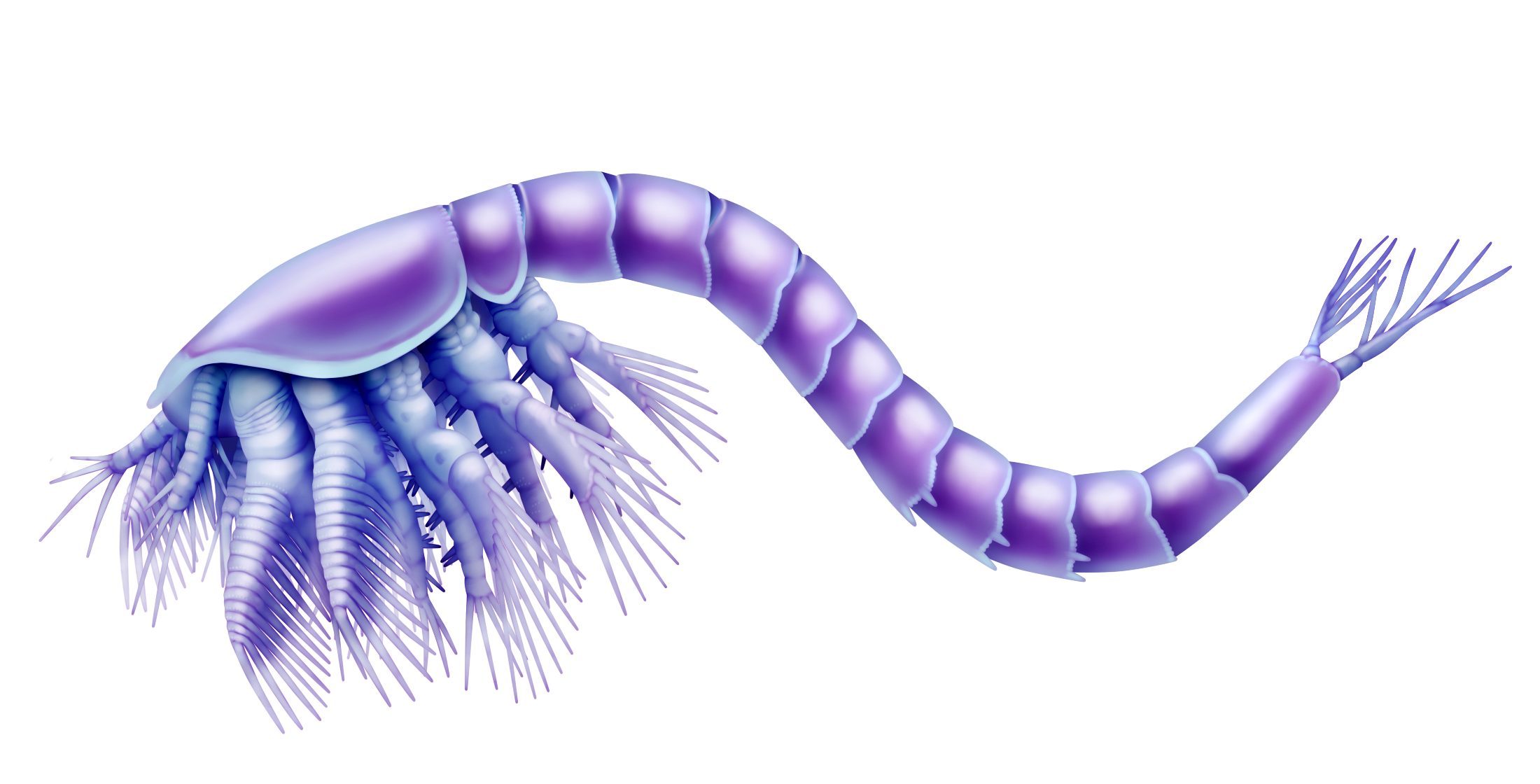
- Reconstruction of Skara anulata
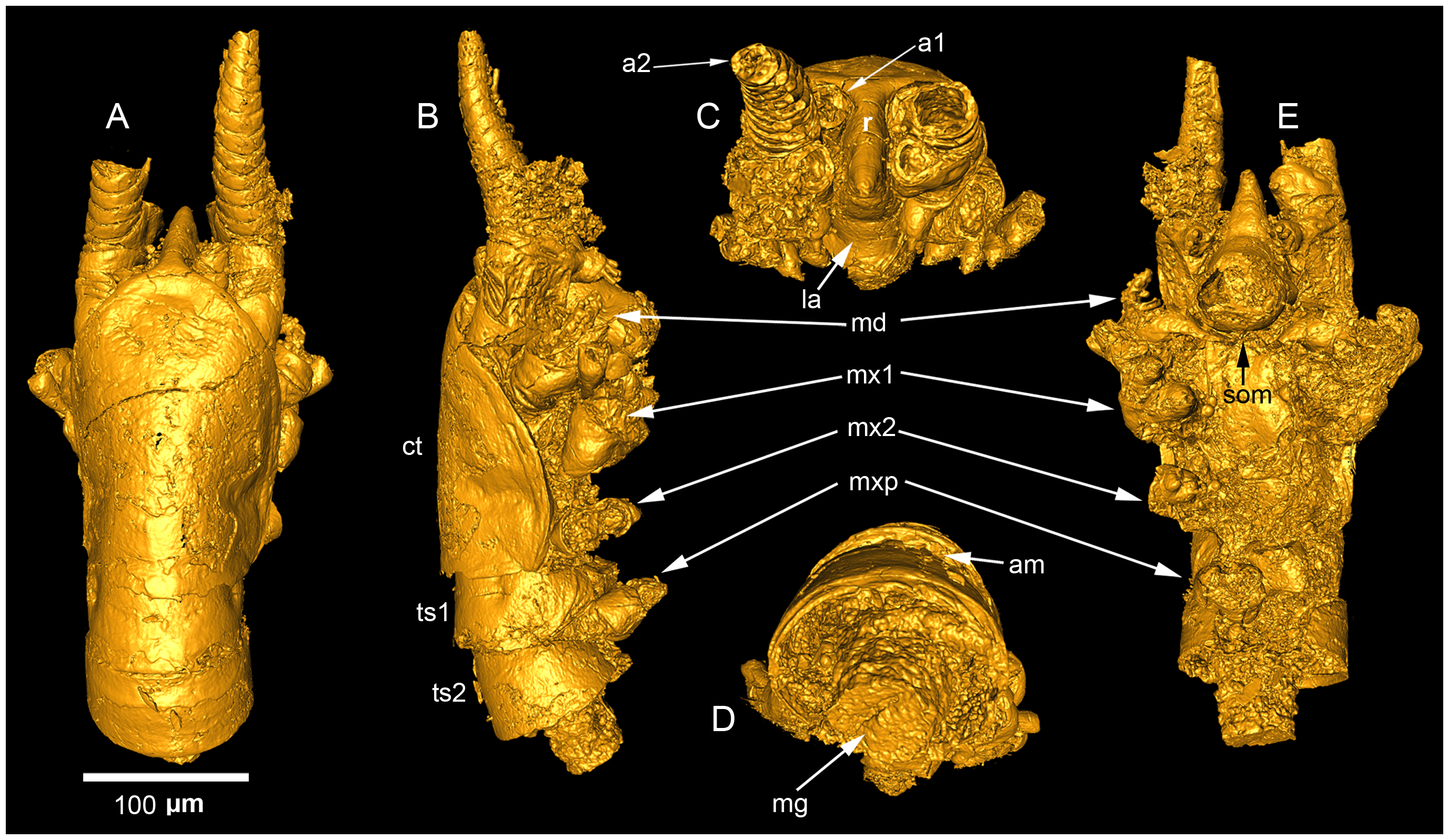
- 3D-rendering of a Skara minuta fossil

Scientific classification
- Kingdom: Animalia
- Phylum: Arthropoda
- Clade: Pancrustacea
- Superclass: Oligostraca
- Order: †Skaracarida; Müller & Walossek, 1985
- Family: †Skaraidae; Müller & Walossek, 1985
- Genus: †Skara; Müller, 1983

Type species
- †Skara anulata Müller, 1983

Species
- †Skara anulata Müller, 1983; †Skara minuta Müller & Walossek, 1985; †Skara hunanensis Liu & Dong, 2007

= Skara (animal) =

Skara Temporal range: Upper Cambrian

Extinct genus of crustaceans

Skara is a genus of oligostracan pancrustaceans known from the Upper Cambrian Orsten deposit of Sweden, similarly aged deposits in China, and possibly Poland. It is the only genus in the order Skaracarida and family Skaraidae, and contains three species, S. anulata, S. minuta and S. hunanensis.

== Description ==
Skara has a head with five segments which each contain an appendage pair; two pairs of antennae, a pair of mandibules and two pairs of maxillae. S. anulata's head shield resembles an inverted "U" in cross-section, and has been likened to an upside-down dinghy in shape, with a margin at its edge and slightly bulging rims. The forehead bears a rod-shaped process in S. minuta (however it is likely broken off in S. anulata), with a tiny pore beneath likely representing a gland opening. The labrum is roughly nose-shaped, with shallow depressions near its posterior end likely representing interior muscles able to move the labrum abaxially. A tripartite structure is recorded from near the antennae, consisting of elevated walls arranged in a semicircle (likely to enlarge the surface for an excretory organ as in modern crustaceans), a pore representing an opening of the "antennal gland" (the purpose of which is unknown) and a sickle-shaped furrow surrounding this pore. Opposite the base of the antennae the surface is covered in several tiny bristles, also of unknown purpose. The postoral sternites are fused into a singular sternum with only shallow furrows indicating the original segments. The antennulae are uniramous and composed of nine segments, with two large setae on the last podomere and several smaller setae on the four other distal podomeres. The antennae and mandibles are the largest limb pairs, with the antennae having a masticatory endite on the coxa while the mandible has a cluster of setae on the protopod. Both antennae and mandibles bear three-segmented endopods, with the exopods of the mandibles having 14 segments and those of the antennae having 12. The maxillae and maxilliped are both similar except for a reduction in size, with only one segment in the exopod and three in the endopod, alongside structures on the coxa which resemble the segments of the endopod. The maxilliped is present on the first trunk segment alongside a tergite with rims somewhat resembling the head shield, while the other ten trunk segments which slowly decrease in diameter are circular and lack limbs entirely, instead bearing spiny fringes on their ventral side. The trunk ends with a telson which itself ends in two caudal furcae. The anus is located on this telson between the furcae. No gonopores are present, which seems to suggest that Skara is a larva.

Skara minuta shows numerous differences from Skara anulata, most prominently more compact and wider trunk segments, the shape of the head shield, and overall being much smaller, alongside more minor differences such as the shape of the labrum.

Skara hunanensis is intermediate in length between the two other species, with a similar trunk shape to S. minuta, alongside having a smaller head shield in proportion to its body than other species as well as numerous more minor differences. In addition, it was found within the region of Hunan in China, while the other two species are from Sweden.

== Classification ==
Being sufficiently different from other representatives of crustacean orders, Skara was placed in the new order Skaracarida. Originally, Skaracarida was compared to tantulocarids and placed within the now obsolete class Maxillopoda. Subsequently, Haug et al. 2011, based on the orientation of the maxillipeds, determined that Skara is likely related to mystacocarids or copepods, forming the clade Copepodoida, and would be the sister taxon of Copepoda. Other studies, based on body plan similarities, argued for a close relationship between Skara and Mystacocarida and that together they would form the infraclass Mystacocaridea.

== Paleobiology ==
The feeding system of Skara resembles those of copepods and mystacocarids, and it is likely to have scraped or brushed the substrate to release food.
