= Shergoldana =

Shergoldana Temporal range: Middle Cambrian

Scientific classification
- Kingdom: Animalia
- (unranked): Cycloneuralia
- Genus: †Shergoldana; Maas, Waloszek, Haug & Müller, 2007
- Species: †S. australensis

Binomial name
- †Shergoldana australensis Maas, Waloszek, Haug & Müller, 2007

Fossil genus of worms

Shergoldana is an extinct genus of fossil bilaterian worm-like organisms known from the Middle Cambrian of Australia. It is described as having common features with Nemathelminthes, with a possible relation to an adult kinorhynch or to the larval stage of a palaeoscolecid worm. It has been described as the first occurrence of a free living cycloneuralian from the Cambrian period.
