= Xenocarida =

Scientific classification
- Domain: Eukaryota
- Kingdom: Animalia
- Phylum: Arthropoda
- Clade: Allotriocarida
- Clade: Xenocarida; Regier et al., 2010

Classes
- Cephalocarida; Remipedia

Clade of crustaceans

Xenocarida (from the Greek for strange shrimp) is a proposed clade inside the subphylum Crustacea that comprises two classes that were discovered in the 20th century: Remipedia and Cephalocarida. Both groups are marine hermaphrodites. The clade was recovered as the sister groups to Hexapoda (including insects).

However, other studies do not recover Xenocarida as a monophyletic group and variously find Branchiopoda or Remipedia as the hexapod sister group
