= Lightiella =

Scientific classification
- Domain: Eukaryota
- Kingdom: Animalia
- Phylum: Arthropoda
- Class: Cephalocarida
- Order: Brachypoda
- Family: Hutchinsoniellidae
- Genus: Lightiella; Jones, 1961

Type species
- Lightiella serendipita Jones, 1961

Species
- Lightiella floridana McLaughlin, 1976; Lightiella incisa Gooding, 1963; Lightiella magdalenina Carcupino et al., 2006; Lightiella monniotae Cals & Delamare, Deboutteville 1970; Lightiella serendipita Jones, 1961

Genus of crustaceans

Lightiella is a genus of crustacean belonging to Hutchinsoniellidae. It was described by Meredith L. Jones in 1961, based on specimens found in San Francisco Bay. The genus contains 5 species.

== Ecology ==
Lightiella is known to live in shallow water sandy sediments.

== Distribution ==
Species of Lightiella are known from around the tropical and temperate coasts of North America, on both the east and west coast, as well as the Mediterranean and around New Caledonia.

== Description ==
Adult cephalocaridans are between 2 and 3.7 mm in length. The body is divided into a cephalon, a segmented thorax and a segmented abdomen, with a cephalic shield covering the cephalon. There are no eyes and the body is flexible and translucent. The thorax has a pair of limbs on each segment while the abdomen is limbless, apart from the telson with its slender caudal filaments. The body and limbs are ornamented with various setae and spines. In Lightiella the eighth somite is much smaller than in related genera, as are the caudal rami.
