= Sandtorpia =

Sandtorpia Temporal range: Upper Cambrian

Scientific classification
- Kingdom: Animalia
- Phylum: Arthropoda
- Family: †Oelandocarididae
- Genus: †Sandtorpia; Haug et al., 2009
- Species: †S. vestrogothiensis

Binomial name
- †Sandtorpia vestrogothiensis Haug et al., 2009

Extinct genus of arthropods

Sandtorpia is an extinct genus of Cambrian arthropods from the Orsten of Sweden. The genus contains a single species, Sandtorpia vestrogothiensis, known from a single specimen.

== Description ==
Sandtorpia is known from a single "head larva" specimen, closely matching with the fifth stage of Henningsmoenicaris, roughly 370 micrometers long. Its body is covered with a large carapace, with an exceptionally long and spiny tail spine at its end. The belly has two sclerotised areas, one near the triangular hypostome and one somewhat further back. The head bears five large appendage pairs longer than the carapace, with a pair of antennae, and three pairs of nearly identical limbs, likely used for swimming. The fifth pair is only partially developed, and is much smaller than the others. While Sandtorpia shares many features with Henningsmoenicaris, therefore suggesting they are likely related, it also has various differences such as a much longer tail spine and lack of eyes (although in the fifth stage of Henningsmoenicaris the eyes are very simple)

== Etymology ==
The name Sandtorpia derives from Sandtorp, a small assemblage of houses near the discovery site. The specific name vestrogothiensis derives from Vestrogothia, the Latin name of Västergötland, the area of Sweden where the fossils are from.
