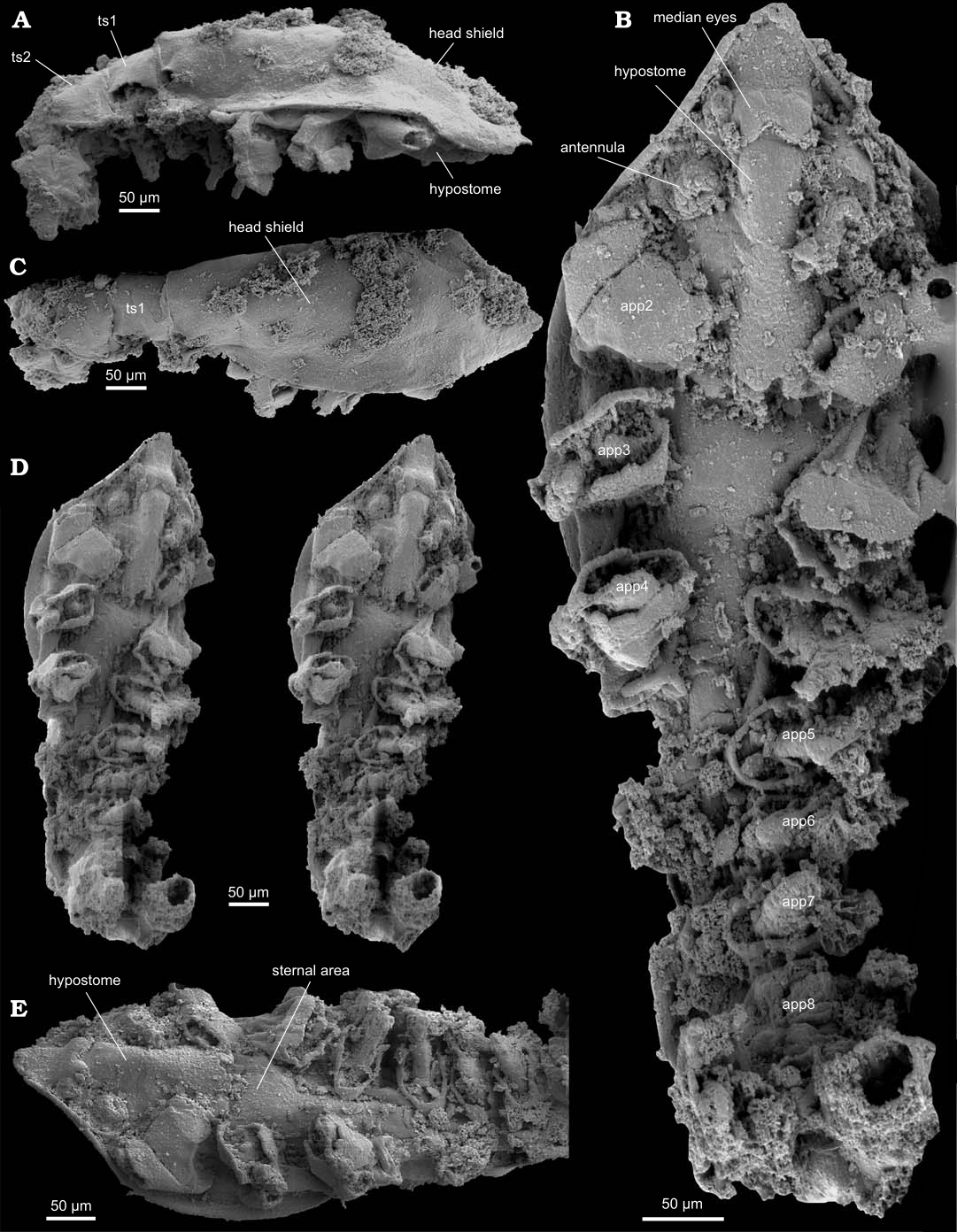
- Holotype specimen

Scientific classification
- Kingdom: Animalia
- Phylum: Arthropoda
- Family: †Oelandocarididae
- Genus: †Oelandocaris; Müller, 1983
- Species: †O. oelandica

Binomial name
- †Oelandocaris oelandica Müller, 1983

= Oelandocaris =

Oelandocaris Temporal range: Upper Cambrian

Extinct genus of arthropods

Oelandocaris is an extinct genus of Cambrian stem-mandibulate, stem-crustacean or possibly megacheiran arthropod of the family Oelandocarididae. It contains only one species, Oelandocaris oelandica.

== Etymology ==
The genus name Oelandocaris derives from the island of Öland in Sweden, a primary location for Orsten fossils, and the Greek word καρίς, meaning "shrimp" or "crab", with the species name oelandica also deriving from the former.

== Description ==
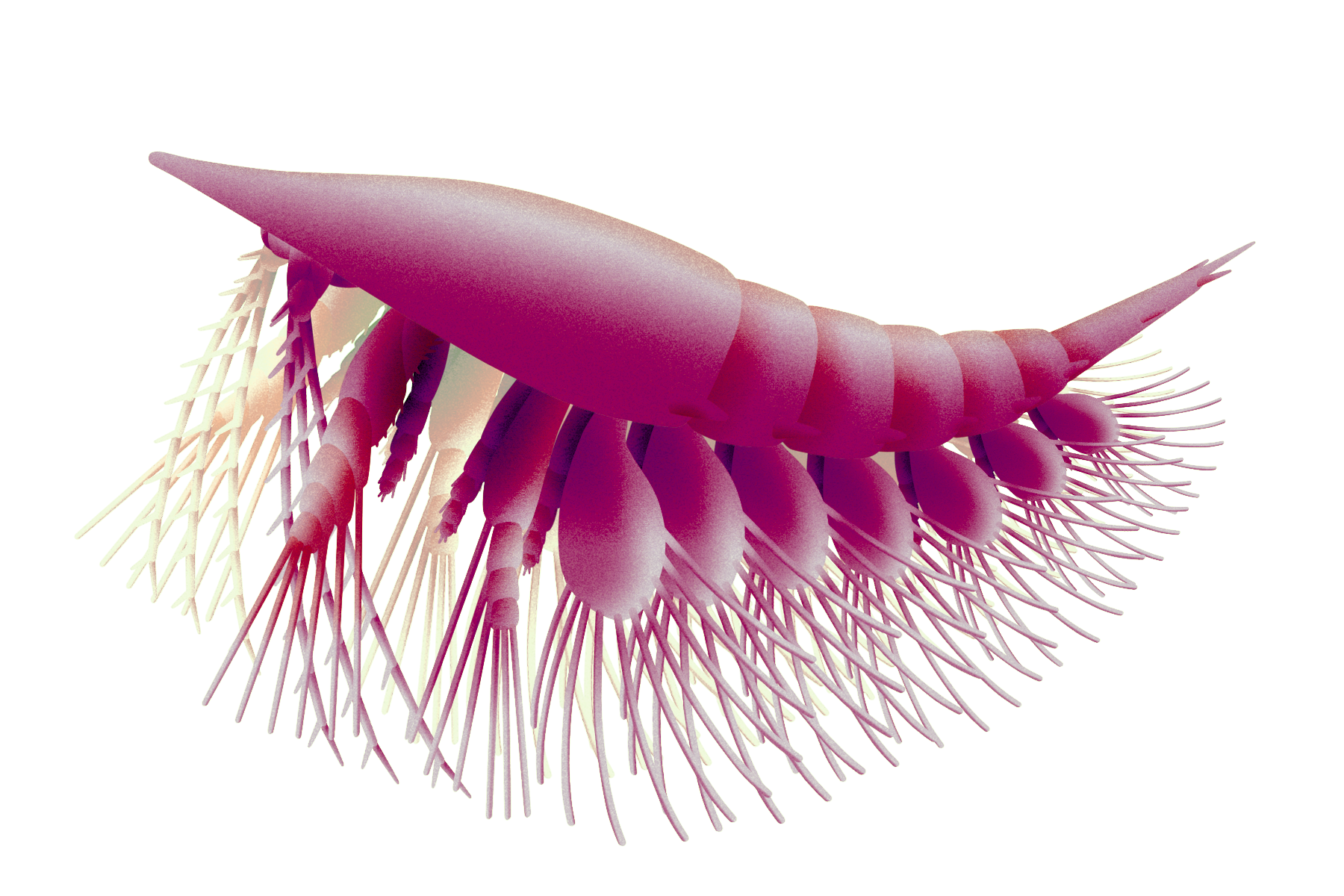
Reconstruction of Oelandocaris

Oelandocaris has a large head shield making up roughly one half of its body length. This head shield is slightly arched, flattening towards the sides (with a slight rise above the mandibles), with a long rostrum at the tip. The back of the shield is straight, but not especially distinct from the first trunk segment. The top of the shield is smooth, with it covering all head segments. Below it, a probable median eye is preserved as a pair of blisters, with a slightly bulged organ leading to the hypostome. This hypostome is rectangular and around half the length of the shield, with the mouth located below its posterior margin and likely overhung by it. This mouth also seems to preserve a membranous “lip”, although this is only seen in the earliest stages. No sternite is preserved on the first segment, although this sternal area may be slightly more sclerotised, with the sternites narrowing towards the posterior which suggests the stomach was likely within the head. Spines protrude from the back corners of the head shield, varying in length from small projections to being very conspicuous. The body is composed of six tergites, the first five with a biramous limb pair and the sixth, posteriormost segment being cylindrical and lacking limbs. These tergites also have spines on the sides of the backwards margin, pointing towards the tail, slowly decreasing in size posteriorly. The tergites are U-shaped in cross-section, with slight overlap between anterior and posterior margins and spines near the back of each. The tail segment is conical and elongated, likely being a telson due to an anal opening being found near its tip. This segment also has a flattened ventral side, with an indentation near the anterior. Oelandocaris is known from seven specimens, all from the Orsten lägerstatte. The original specimen only preserved the body, however more complete specimens including limbs have been found, alongside several being of earlier life stages, with one even being from a stage where the rostrum had not developed yet.

=== Limbs ===
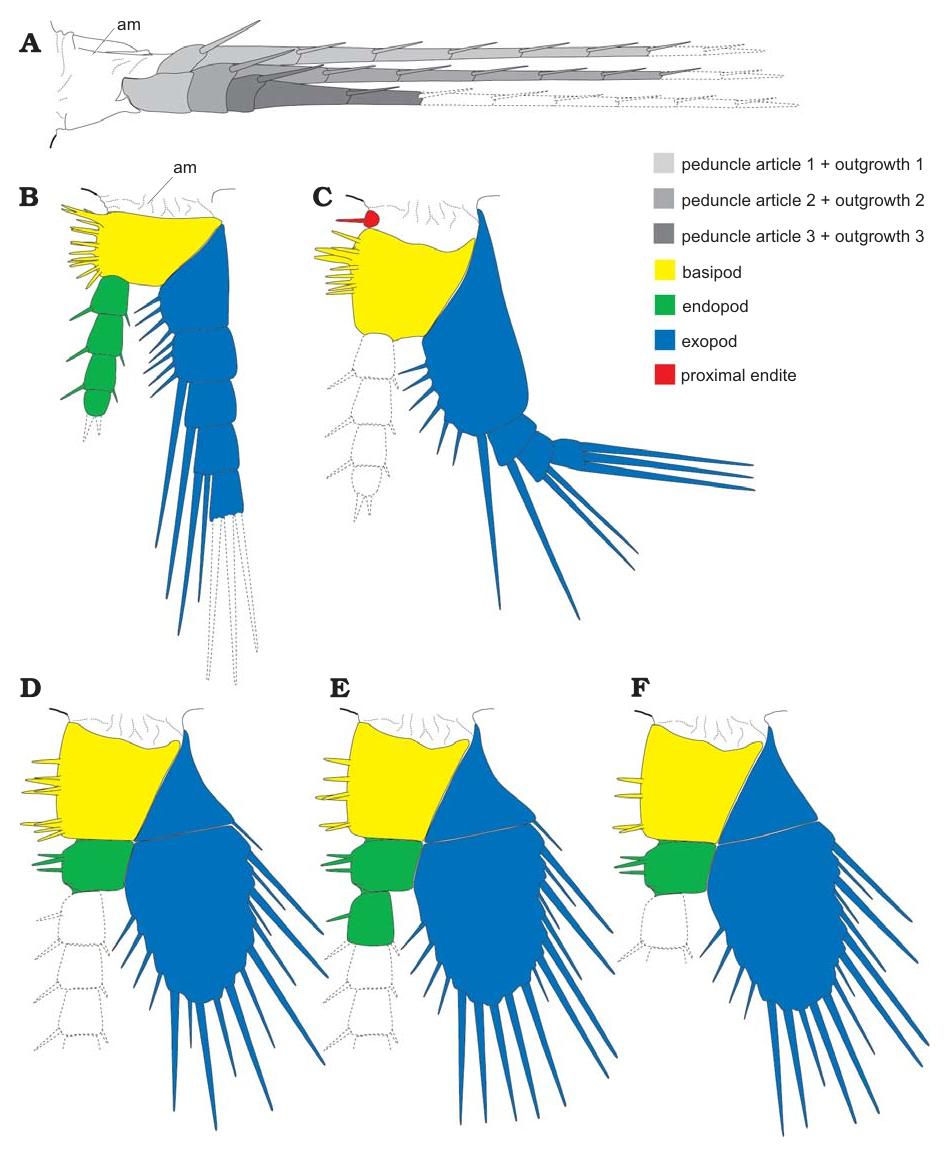
Reconstruction of the appendages of Oelandocaris. A. Antennula. B–F. Second to sixth appendages

In front of the median eye, small antennulae are preserved, with larger antennae at the sides of the labrum. The mandibles and maxillae point towards the mouth, and the body limbs narrow towards the posterior along with the segments, meaning their coxae become closer together as well. The antennulae are extremely specialised, being relatively short (only three segments), but each segment bearing an extremely long outgrowth from its outwards side itself composed of several segments, with these outgrowths likely being at least half the body length. The segments of the outgrowths bear several setae, with these likely pointing outwards based on the insertion sites. Meanwhile, the limb’s segments also bear setae on their outwards edges. The second limb pair, and all others afterwards, are biramous. This second pair has a two-rowed array of eight spines/setae in each row on the basipod (inner limb portion)’s inner surface, with the forward row’s first spine having a forked tip and reaching under the hypostome. The endopod is quite short with five segments, meanwhile the exopod is larger (around twice the basipod’s size) and flattened, with each segment bearing one to two setae along their sides. The third limb pair has a somewhat longer basipod with only four setae pairs (also in two rows) and lacks the longer forked spine. The endopod of this appendage is unknown, whereas the exopod is somewhat narrower and longer than that of the second pair, with only four segments (the first being the only broadened one), and the fourth being quite small and narrow. The fourth and fifth pairs are similar, with slightly shorter basipods than the second and only bearing a cluster of setae on them. The endopods are only known from the first two segments (with the second being badly preserved), with the exopods being paddle-shaped and composed of two portions with a hinge in the middle. The first portion is triangular in shape and bears one seta on its back corner, whereas the second has multiple long setae along its margin. Alongside this, tiny spines referred to as denticles are also recorded on the outwards edge of the fourth and fifth head appendages, alongside the trunk appendages, which are similar to the former except with smaller basipods and being positioned closer together going down the body. Small pores on the tergites and limb exopods have been interpreted as sockets for sensilla.

== Palaeobiology ==
Animation showing sequence of movement of appendages

The whole animal only measures about a millimetre long, similar in size to other Orsten fauna. As the exopods of Oelandocaris's limbs are large and flattened, it is very likely that it was a swimming animal, and presumably planktonic, based on its size. The swimming cycle likely involved the post-antennular limbs being moved outwards and backwards, opening a space for the antennulae to sweep back and transfer food into the mouth, then them moving back in and forward with the antennulae being swept out to gather food. The setae on the basipods likely helped move food towards the mouth as well, with the inward-facing setae on the second and third post-antennular limb pairs helping to trap escaping food particles for the next cycle. The post-antennular limbs likely moved metachronally, similar to modern fairy shrimp. Like modern fairy shrimp, it likely swam in the water column, possibly upside-down if near the substrate. Within the swimming stroke, the whole limb likely swung backwards, as evidenced by the arthrodial membrane forming sockets which increased their flexibility.
