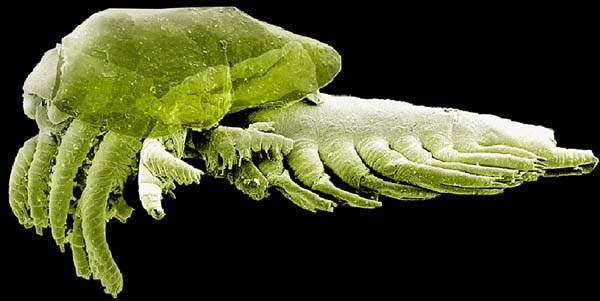
- Composite image of three fossil specimens of Bredocaris

Scientific classification
- Kingdom: Animalia
- Phylum: Arthropoda
- Clade: Pancrustacea
- Order: †Orstenocarida; Müller & Walossek, 1988
- Family: †Bredocarididae; Müller & Walossek, 1988
- Genus: †Bredocaris; Müller, 1983
- Species: †B. admirabilis

Binomial name
- †Bredocaris admirabilis Müller, 1983

= Bredocaris =

Bredocaris Temporal range: Upper Cambrian

Cambrian genus of crustacean

Bredocaris is an extinct genus of pancrustacean arthropod from the Cambrian Orsten of Sweden. The genus contains a single species, Bredocaris admirabilis, in turn the only member of the family Bredocarididae and the order Orstenocarida.

== Etymology ==
Bredocaris is named for the farm of St. Bredegården located north of the type locality, and for the Greek word χαρίς (kharís), meaning "crab." The species name admirabilis from the Latin word meaning "admirable" derives from the extremely delicate preservation of the specimen.

== Description ==
Bredocaris is roughly 800 micrometers long, with the carapace roughly half as long, rounded and fused with the four anteriormost limb-bearing segments, and has a possible median eye consisting of two blisters connected by a bridge with a median pore. The front two appendage pairs, which may represent antennae, are both different to the posterior ten pairs of appendages which seem to form a filter apparatus. The labrum is large and noticeably projects from the body anterior of the molar process. The abdominal segment has a pair of furcae, alongside a tiny spine dorsoterminally above the anus. Six distinct larval stages of Bredocaris are known from more than 30 specimens, which alongside other features such as the complete filter apparatus and shape of the fourth appendage pair seems to indicate that the final stage was the adult form of this genus.

== Distribution ==
All specimens of Bredocaris so far have been found in Västergötland, Sweden near a road between Stenstorp and Dala.
