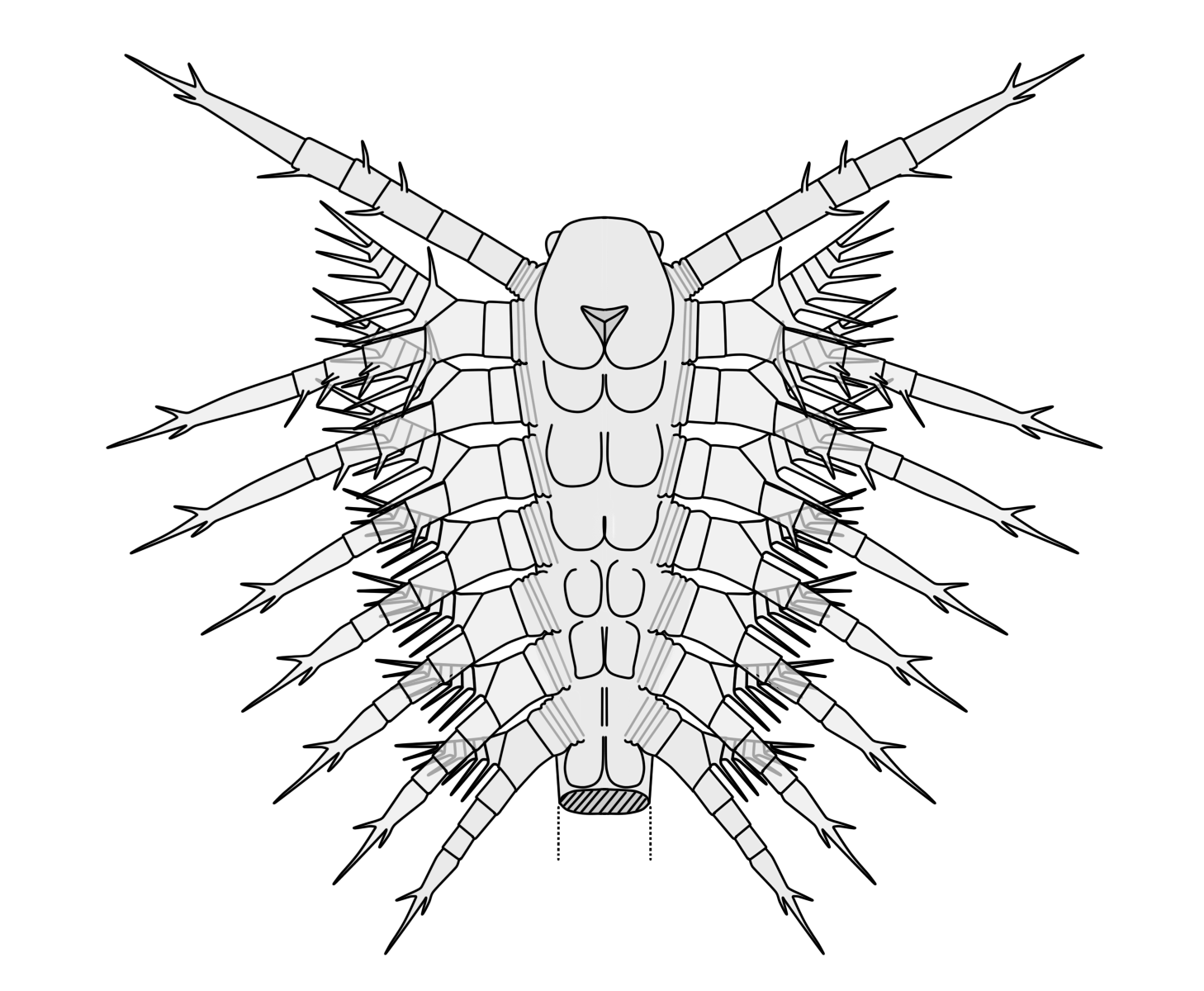
- A partial reconstruction of Cambrocaris

Scientific classification
- Domain: Eukaryota
- Kingdom: Animalia
- Clade: Panarthropoda
- Phylum: Arthropoda
- Genus: †Cambrocaris; Waloszek and Szaniawski, 1991
- Species: †C. baltica

Binomial name
- †Cambrocaris baltica Waloszek and Szaniawski, 1991

= Cambrocaris =

Cambrocaris Temporal range: Furongian

Extinct genus of crustacean

Cambrocaris is an extinct genus of Upper Cambrian arthropods from Poland. The genus contains a single species, Cambrocaris baltica.

The generic name derives from its Cambrian origin, meanwhile the specific name reflects the type locality being located near the Baltic Sea.

== Description ==
Cambrocaris bears a bulging structure on the underside of its head, referred to as a “hypostome” to separate it from the crustacean labrum. This hypostome is split in two by a cleft running towards a triangular area filled with organic particles, which interpreted as the mouth. While a bulge is visible on some photos of this structure, no view from behind could be obtained and so it is unclear whether this bulge represents a lateral eye. The trunk is circular in cross-section and appears to be as wide as the sternal area. This area increases in width up to the fourth appendage pair, then decreases thereafter. On its ventral surface it is smooth (pores also cannot be seen, but this may just reflect the rough surface of the fossil), with faint indents marking segment boundaries. Unusually while segment size remains the same along the body, the limbs change in spacing, a phenomenon known as “segment decoupling” in other arthropods. A thin groove runs from the “hypostome” down to the sixth appendage pair, with this also being filled with organic particles (suggesting it may be a “food groove” for transporting particles to the mouth). While the sternal portions are most obvious in the fourth and fifth segments, no tagmatisation is known from Cambrocaris.

=== Limbs ===
Cambrocaris bears at least nine pairs of limbs, with several more likely on the unpreserved portion of the body. Its first limbs, the antennae, are likely the longest. These are composed of seven podomeres with a basal shaft, five similar podomeres and a long leaf-shaped segment at the tip which may have borne setae at its end based on other limbs. The other podomeres may also have borne setae, however only the fifth has conclusive evidence. The following limb pairs are similar in shape, each bearing a coxa and basipod at their bases with one large spine on the latter. The endopod is quite similar to the first antennae yet smaller, with few spines on its inner edge. Meanwhile, the exopod is much more compact with long setae on each of its five segments. The second limb pair is the largest of these, with their size decreasing thereafter. The exopods after the fifth limb pair may also have been paddle-shaped, however as they are barely preserved this is uncertain.

== Palaeobiology ==
Cambrocaris was likely benthic, similar to other Orsten fauna, however various features of the limbs imply it was well-adapted to swimming and did not crawl. It likely swam by moving its limbs backwards and forwards, supported by the first antennae resembling the endopods of other limbs, also supporting the idea that the antennae too were used for swimming. Unusually the inner edges of its limbs barely have any spines, a feature only shared by the much smaller non-feeding larvae of Martinssonia. Cambrocaris was not a non-feeding larva as well, since its fossil has a prominent mouth. This suggests it likely was not a filter-feeder, and instead captured prey with what few spines it had before swallowing them whole.
