= Walossekia =

Walossekia Temporal range: Upper Cambrian

Scientific classification
- Kingdom: Animalia
- Superphylum: Ecdysozoa
- Clade: Panarthropoda
- Phylum: Arthropoda
- Genus: †Walossekia; Müller, 1983
- Species: †W. quinquespinosa

Binomial name
- †Walossekia quinquespinosa Müller, 1983

Extinct genus of arthropods

Walossekia quinquespinosa is a Cambrian species of arthropod from the Orsten of Sweden. It is the only species in the genus Walossekia.

== Description ==
Walossekia is roughly 850 micrometers long, with a large carapace covering most of its body except for the abdomen. The smooth, boat-shaped carapace has five spines on its posterior rim with the median one being largest, and a long rostrum on its anterior end. Walossekia's abdomen has no appendages except for a pair of caudal furcae roughly as long as said abdomen, with setae at their ends. The head has three specialised pairs of appendages, alongside a labrum and median eye. The body of Walossekia has five serially developed pairs, the first four of which form a filter apparatus whilst the last was likely still developing. Due to this, the holotype is likely still larval, and one or two larger growth stages have been recorded.

== Etymology ==
Walossekia derives from the name of Dieter Waloßek, who helped with the reconstruction drawings within the paper. The specific name quinquespinosa translates to "five-spined", referring to the five spines on the posterior rim of the carapace.
