= Musacaris =

Musacaris Temporal range: Upper Cambrian

Scientific classification
- Kingdom: Animalia
- Phylum: Arthropoda
- Genus: †Musacaris; Haug et al, 2010
- Species: †M. gerdgeyeri

Binomial name
- †Musacaris gerdgeyeri Haug et al, 2010

Extinct Cambrian arthropod

Musacaris is an extinct genus of Cambrian arthropod from the Orsten Lagerstätte, formerly synonymous with Martinssonia. It contains only a single species, Musacaris gerdgeyeri.

== Description ==
Musacaris is a small (roughly 0.8 mm long), unsegmented arthropod, with four pairs of appendages. It has a pair of antennae, and three pairs of biramous appendages. It also has an unusual projection on its head, possibly the future position of the mouth. The unsegmented body suggests all current specimens of Musacaris may be so-called "head larvae". The five developmental stages are quite similar, with the same amount and positioning of the limbs. Currently, Musacaris is thought to be a basal mandibulate or stem-crustacean, possibly sister to labrophorans (Crustacea and Phosphatocopina).

== Distribution ==
Musacaris is known from thirteen specimens of different larval forms, all from the Orsten Lagerstätte in Sweden, alongside twenty-one other specimens referred to Martinssonia elongata.
