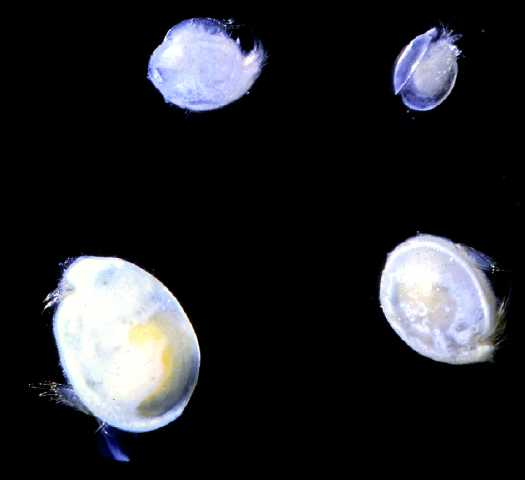
- Ostracods (Euphilomedes climax)

Scientific classification
- Kingdom: Animalia
- Phylum: Arthropoda
- Clade: Pancrustacea
- Superclass: Oligostraca; Zrzavý, Hypša, & Vlášková, 1997

Classes
- Class Mystacocarida; Class Ichthyostraca; Subclass Branchiura; Subclass Pentastomida; Class Ostracoda; Subclass Myodocopa; Subclass Podocopa; Class †Skaracarida; Family †Sunellidae

= Oligostraca =

Oligostraca Temporal range: Cambrian–Recent

Superclass of crustaceans

Oligostraca is a superclass of crustaceans. It consists of the following classes:

Class Mystacocarida: Minute crustaceans (0.5 to 1 mm in length) restricted to interstitial marine sediments. Locomotion depends completely on the presence of dorsal and ventral substrates.

Class Ostracoda (seed shrimp): Small planktonic, demersal and benthic crustaceans with a cosmopolitan aquatic distribution in both freshwater and marine environments, and a few in damp terrestrial habitats. Often called seed shrimps because their body is enclosed within a small and bivalved (with one exception) carapace, which makes them look like seed.

Class Ichthyostraca:

Subclass Branchiura (fish lice): Ectoparasitic crustaceans on marine and freshwater fish, ranging in size from a few millimeters to 30 mm. A carapace is covering most of their body, which is dorsoventrally flattened. They are able to switch hosts several times even as adults.

Subclass Pentastomida (tongue worms): Vermiform endoparasites. The larvae develop in the tissues of mammals, reptiles, amphibians, fish, and a few species of coprophagous insects, which all are intermediate hosts. When eaten by other mammals, reptiles, amphibians and birds, which are the definitive hosts, the parasite develops to an adult (length 1–16 cm) found in the host's respiratory tracts. The genus Linguatula lives in the nasal cavity of mostly carnivorous mammals, but can also be found in humans, sheep and goats, and can sometimes reach the sinuses and middle ear.

Class †Skaracarida: Long-bodied, marine, likely benthic detritivores. Only contains the genus Skara. Extinct, fossils known from the Cambrian.
