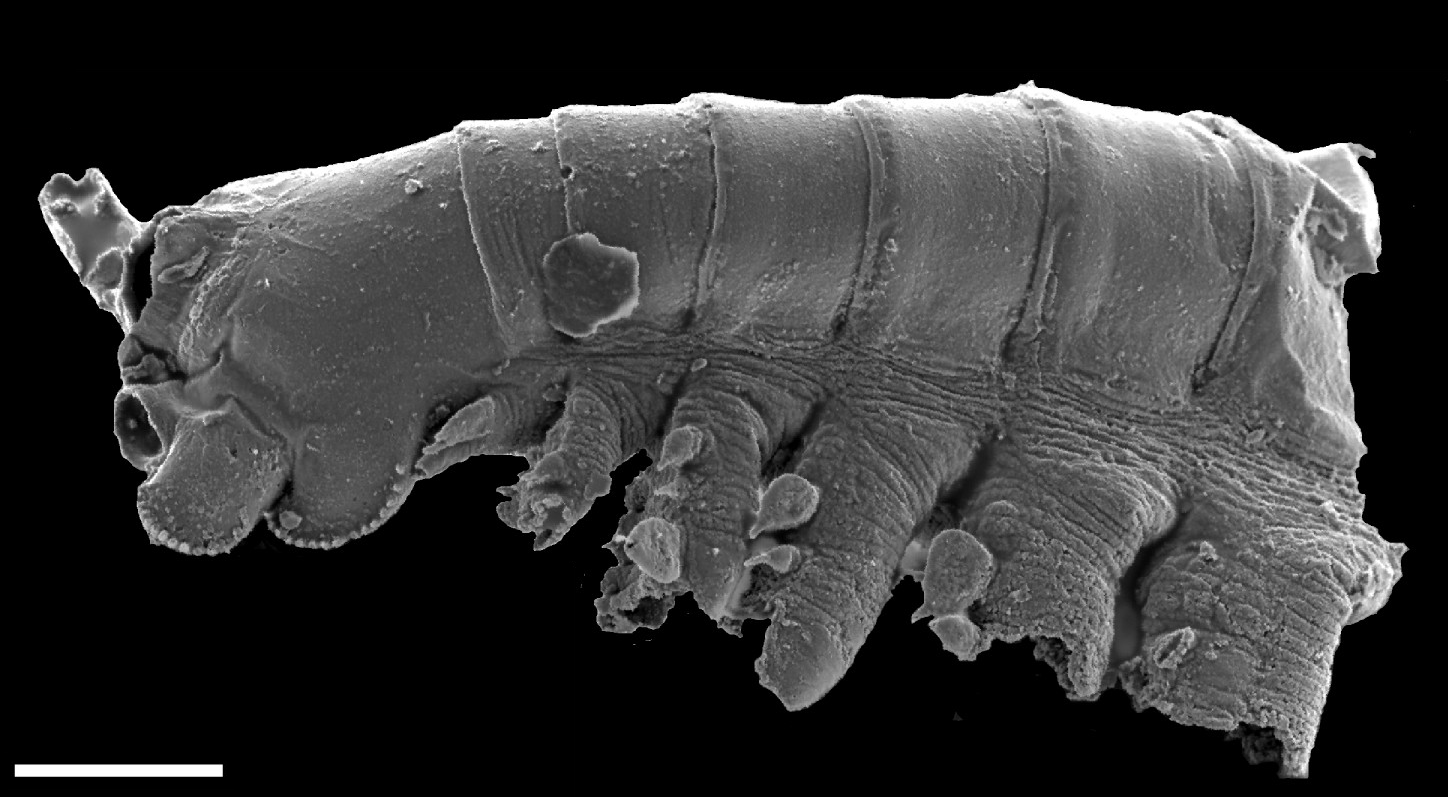
- Holotype specimen
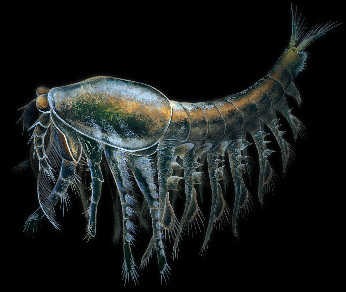
- Artist's reconstruction of Yicaris dianensis

Scientific classification
- Kingdom: Animalia
- Phylum: Arthropoda
- Clade: Pancrustacea
- Genus: †Yicaris; Zhang et al., 2007

Type species
- †Yicaris dianensis Zhang et al., 2007

= Yicaris =

Yicaris Temporal range: Cambrian Stage 3

Species of microscopic crustaceans

Yicaris dianensis is a species of microscopic pancrustacean found in the Yu’anshan Formation, Yunnan Province, China. Yicaris' discovery is notable because its age suggests that true crustaceans already existed as far back in time as Early Cambrian, much earlier than other fossils known from the Middle and Late Cambrian. Its closest living relatives are believed to be cephalocaridans.

== Etymology ==
The name Yicaris dianensis honors the ethnic minority Yi people of Yunnan Province, while Dian is an ancient kingdom of southern China. The suffix —caris refers to shrimp in Latin.

== Description ==
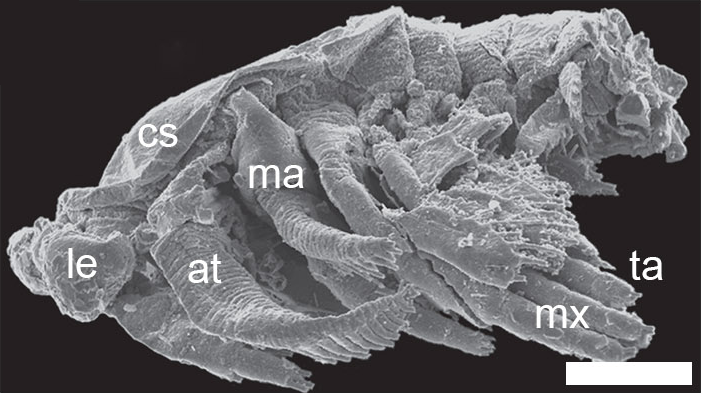
Relatively complete specimen with preserved appendages. (Note: Abbreviations: at, antenna(e); cs, cephalic shield; le, lateral eye(s); ma, mandible(s); mx, maxillula and maxilla; ta, trunk appendage(s).)

Yicaris' body consists of a cephalothorax covered by a head shield and limb-bearing segments.

Out of the thirty-four specimens examined, six consecutive growth stages are known, the smallest one being 460 μm while the largest fossil, though fragmentary, reaches 1.8 mm long.

Yicaris is also notable for the leaf-like structures on its limbs called epipodites. The developmental origin of epipodites is thought to be enigmatic, but Yicaris' discovery shows that early crustaceans already possessed a set of three epipodites on their limbs. This structure is considered important due to its potential significance in the evolution of wings in insects, which evolved from within Pancrustacea.
