= Martinssonia =

Martinssonia Temporal range: Upper Cambrian

Scientific classification
- Kingdom: Animalia
- Phylum: Arthropoda
- Genus: †Martinssonia; Walossek & Müller, 1986
- Species: †M. elongata

Binomial name
- †Martinssonia elongata Walossek & Müller, 1986

Extinct Cambrian arthropod

Martinssonia is an extinct genus of Cambrian arthropod from the Orsten Lagerstätte.

== Description ==
Martinssonia is a small (roughly 1.5 mm long) arthropod, with eight pairs of appendages and ten segments including the eyeless head. It has a pair of antennae, twelve biramous appendages on its head and front two body segments and a final pair of uniramous appendages on its third segment. Martinssonia also seems to have a pleotelson, similar to modern crustacean larvae.

== Ecology ==
Martinssonia was presumably a benthic detritivore, stirring up food particles from the seafloor.

== Etymology ==
Martinssonia is named for Anders Martinsson, a former Professor of Palaeobiology at Uppsala University in Sweden. The species name, elongata, is derived from its long trunk.

== Distribution ==
Martinssonia is known from twenty-one specimens of different larval forms, all from the Orsten Lagerstätte in Sweden, alongside thirteen specimens now referred to as Musacaris
