= Henningsmoenicaris =

Henningsmoenicaris Temporal range: Upper Cambrian

Scientific classification
- Kingdom: Animalia
- Superphylum: Ecdysozoa
- Clade: Panarthropoda
- Phylum: Arthropoda
- Genus: †Henningsmoenicaris; Müller and Waloszek, 1990
- Species: †H. scutula

Binomial name
- †Henningsmoenicaris scutula (Müller & Waloszek, 1990)

Extinct genus of arthropods

Henningsmoenicaris is an extinct genus of Cambrian arthropods from the Orsten of Sweden. It was formerly named Henningsmoenia, however this name was preoccupied by an ostracod, therefore it was renamed. Its genus name translates to "Henningsmoen's shrimp" after G. Henningsmoen. The genus contains a single species, Henningsmoenicaris scutula, with the specific name, scutula referencing the large, bowl-shaped carapace.

== Morphology ==
Henningsmoenicaris unusually had an almost 360° field of vision, with two extremely long stalked eyes facing in almost all directions at once, even inwards to give depth perception to the opposite eye. Aside from this, it is a relatively "ordinary" Orsten arthropod with a large bowl-shaped head shield, five pairs of differentiated head appendages including antennules used for swimming, a three-segmented thorax with a pair of appendages on each segment (alongside a ninth pair seemingly still developing in the most developed complete specimen), a five-spined tail segment and a hypostome on the head. The most developed complete fossil is roughly 550 micrometers long, however a trunk fragment of a much larger and more developed specimen suggests even this form is a larva.
