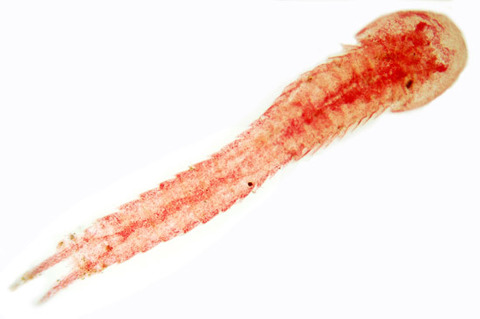
- Hutchinsoniella macracantha

Scientific classification
- Kingdom: Animalia
- Phylum: Arthropoda
- Clade: Pancrustacea
- Class: Cephalocarida; Sanders, 1955
- Order: Brachypoda; Birshteyn, 1960
- Family: Hutchinsoniellidae; Sanders, 1955

Genera
- Chiltoniella; Hampsonellus; Hutchinsoniella; Lightiella; Sandersiella

Synonyms
- Lightiellidae Jones 1961

= Cephalocarida =

Cephalocarida Temporal range: 462–0 Ma

Class of crustaceans

The Cephalocarida (from Ancient Greek κεφαλή (kephalḗ), meaning "head", and καρίς (karís), meaning "shrimp") are a class in the subphylum Crustacea comprising only 12 species. Both the nauplii and the adults are benthic. They were discovered in 1955 by Howard L. Sanders, and are commonly referred to as horseshoe shrimp. They have been grouped together with the Remipedia in the Xenocarida. Although a second family, Lightiellidae, is sometimes used, all cephalocaridans are generally considered to belong in just one family: Hutchinsoniellidae. Fossil records of cephalocaridans have been found in the Ordovician Castle Bank site.

== Taxonomy ==
- Class Cephalocarida Sanders 1955
  - Order Brachypoda Birshteyn 1960
    - Family Hutchinsoniellidae Sanders 1955
      - Genus Chiltoniella Knox & Fenwick 1977
        - Chiltoniella elongata Knox & Fenwick 1977
      - Genus Hampsonellus Hessler & Wakabara 2000
        - Hampsonellus brasiliensis Hessler & Wakabara 2000
      - Genus Hutchinsoniella Sanders 1955
        - Hutchinsoniella macracantha Sanders 1955
      - Genus Lightiella Jones 1961
        - Lightiella floridana McLaughlin 1976
        - Lightiella incisa Gooding 1963
        - Lightiella magdalenina Carcupino et al. 2006
        - Lightiella monniotae Cals & Delamare Deboutteville 1970
        - Lightiella serendipita Jones 1961
      - Genus Sandersiella Shiino 1965
        - Sandersiella acuminata Shiino 1965
        - Sandersiella bathyalis Hessler & Sanders 1973
        - Sandersiella calmani Hessler & Sanders 1973
        - Sandersiella kikuchii Shimomura & Akiyama 2008

== Description and anatomy ==
These are hermaphroditic and pigmentless crustaceans with an elongated and translucent body that measures 2 to 4 mm (0.079 to 0.157 in) in length. A heart is present, and their exopods and pseudepipodites appears to be used for gas exchange. They have a large head, the hind edge of which covers the first thoracic segment. The thorax consists of nine limb-bearing segments (thoracic limb VIII absent in Lightiella), followed by 10 limbless abdominal segments and a telson. In the larva, all the trunk segments are ring-shaped, but more dorsoventrally flattened than in the adults. During growth the anterior segments turns into the thorax and the posterior segments which makes up the abdomen remains ring-shaped. No eyes have been observed in either the adult or larval stages, presumably because of their muddy natural habitat. The second pair of antennae is located behind the mouth; in all other crustaceans the antennae are in front of the mouth at the adult stage, and only their larvae have antennae that have the same location as adult cephalocaridans.

The mouth is located behind the large upper lip, flanked by mandibles. The first pair of maxillae is very small, and the second pair has the same structure as the following thoracic legs: a large basal part, equipped with outgrowths on the inner side, used in locomotion, a forked inner branch and two outer lobes - referred to as the "pseudoepipod" and the "exopod". The structural and functional similarity between the maxillae and the legs may be a sign of primitive organization; the maxillae are not specialized, as they are in other crustaceans.

== Ecology ==
Cephalocaridans are found from the intertidal zone down to a depth of 1,500 m (4,900 ft), in all kinds of sediments. Cephalocaridans feed on marine detritus. To bring in food particles, they generate currents with the thoracic appendages like the branchiopods and the malacostracans. Food particles are then passed anteriorly along a ventral groove, leading to the mouthparts.
