= Branchioscorpionoidea =

Branchioscorpionoidea Temporal range: Telychian–Lochkovian

Scientific classification
- Kingdom: Animalia
- Phylum: Arthropoda
- Subphylum: Chelicerata
- Class: Arachnida
- Order: Scorpiones
- Suborder: †Bilobosternina; Kjellesvig-Waering, 1986
- Superfamily: †Branchioscorpionoidea; Kjellesvig-Waering, 1986

Families
- †Branchioscorpionidae Kjellesvig-Waering, 1986; †Dolichophoniidae Petrunkevitch, 1953

Extinct superfamily of scorpions

Branchioscorpionoidea is an extinct superfamily of scorpions containing two families, Branchioscorpionidae and Dolichophoniidae, both of which are monogeneric.

The family Dolichophoniidae contains the oldest known scorpion, Dolichophonus, as the older Parioscorpio named in 2020 has been found to be an unrelated arthropod.
