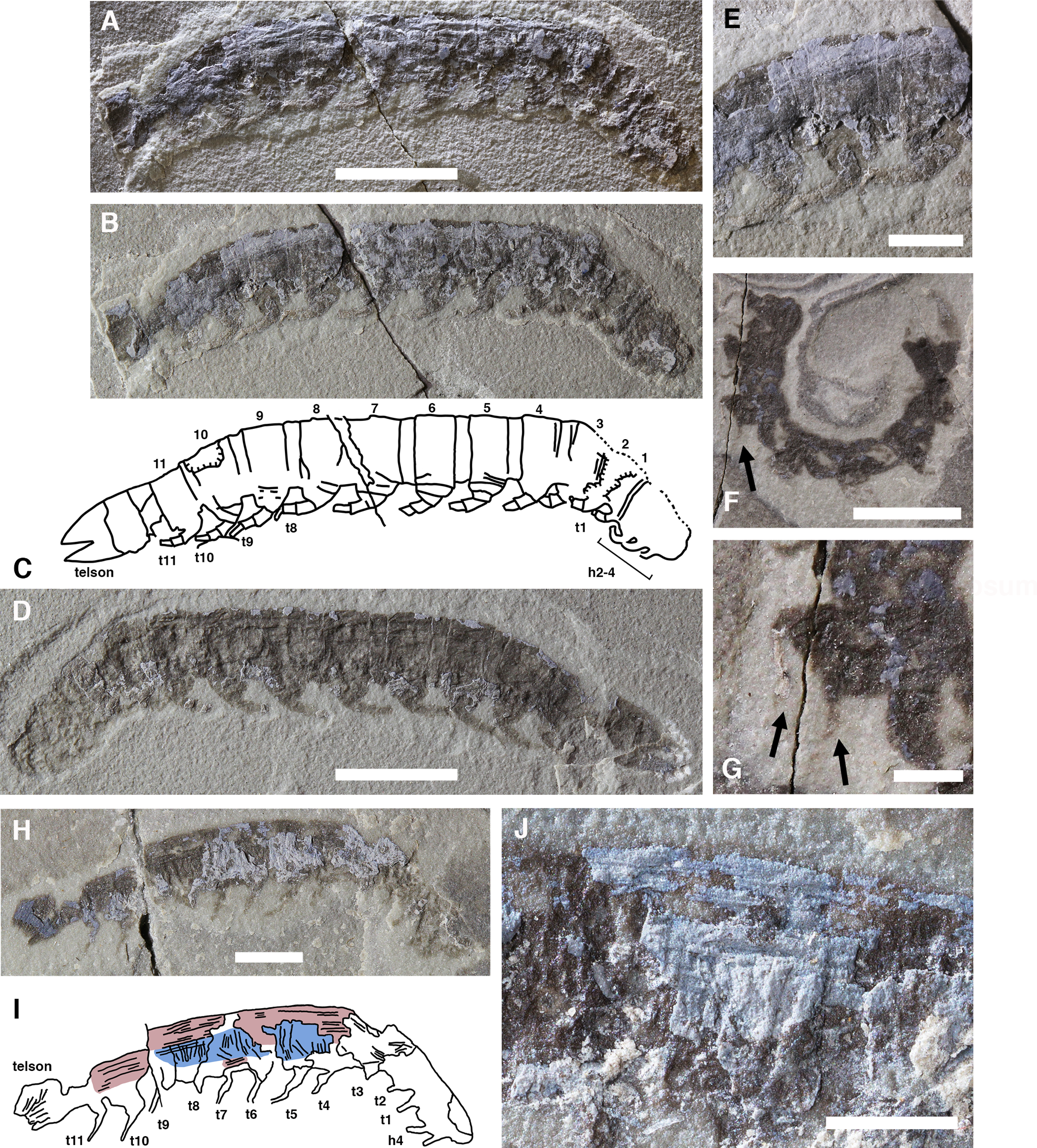
- The holotype of Waukartus muscularis (A-E) and two other specimens (F-G and H-J)

Scientific classification
- Kingdom: Animalia
- Phylum: Arthropoda
- Clade: Mandibulata
- Stem group: Myriapoda
- Genus: †Waukartus; Briggs, Lamsdell, Kluessendorf & Mikulic, 2026
- Species: †W. muscularis

Binomial name
- †Waukartus muscularis Briggs, Lamsdell, Kluessendorf & Mikulic, 2026

= Waukartus =

Waukartus Temporal range: Silurian, Llandoverian (Telychian), 437.4–436.2 Ma

Extinct genus of stem-myriapod

Waukartus is an extinct genus of stem group myriapod known from the Waukesha Lagerstätte in the Brandon Bridge Formation (Wisconsin, United States), from strata dating to the Telychian age of the Silurian period. It is a monotypic genus, represented by a single species, Waukartus muscularis.

The genus inhabited marine substrates yet it already presented walking uniramous limbs, a condition seen in the amphibious euthycarcinoids and the terrestrial crown-myriapods and previously though to be an adaptation to terrestrial environments. This seems to indicate that the loss of exopods likely occurred prior to the terrestrialization of the myriapod total-group, emerging in a marine setting and later being coopted into a new function under this new environmental context, an example of exaptation.

== Description ==
The head of Waukartus comprised 4 pairs of head appendages, situated posteriorly to a subcircular feature interpreted a likely stalked eye. Posterior to the head, the trunk had 11 segments. Each segment bore a single pair of simple uniramous walking legs, each segmented into at least 6 podomeres. The trunk terminates at a telson with paired blade-like ventrally positioned projections.

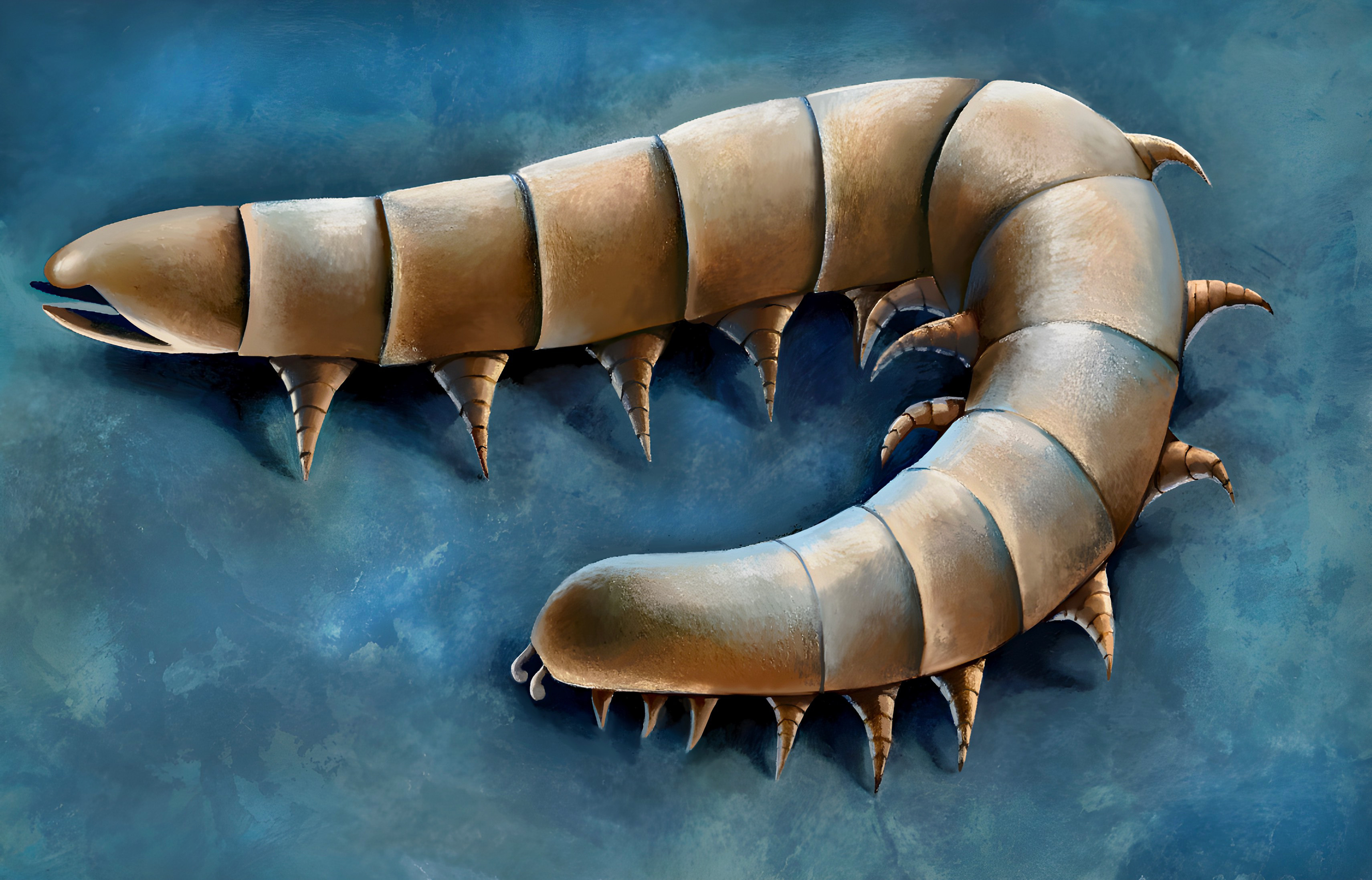
Reconstruction of Waukartus muscularis
