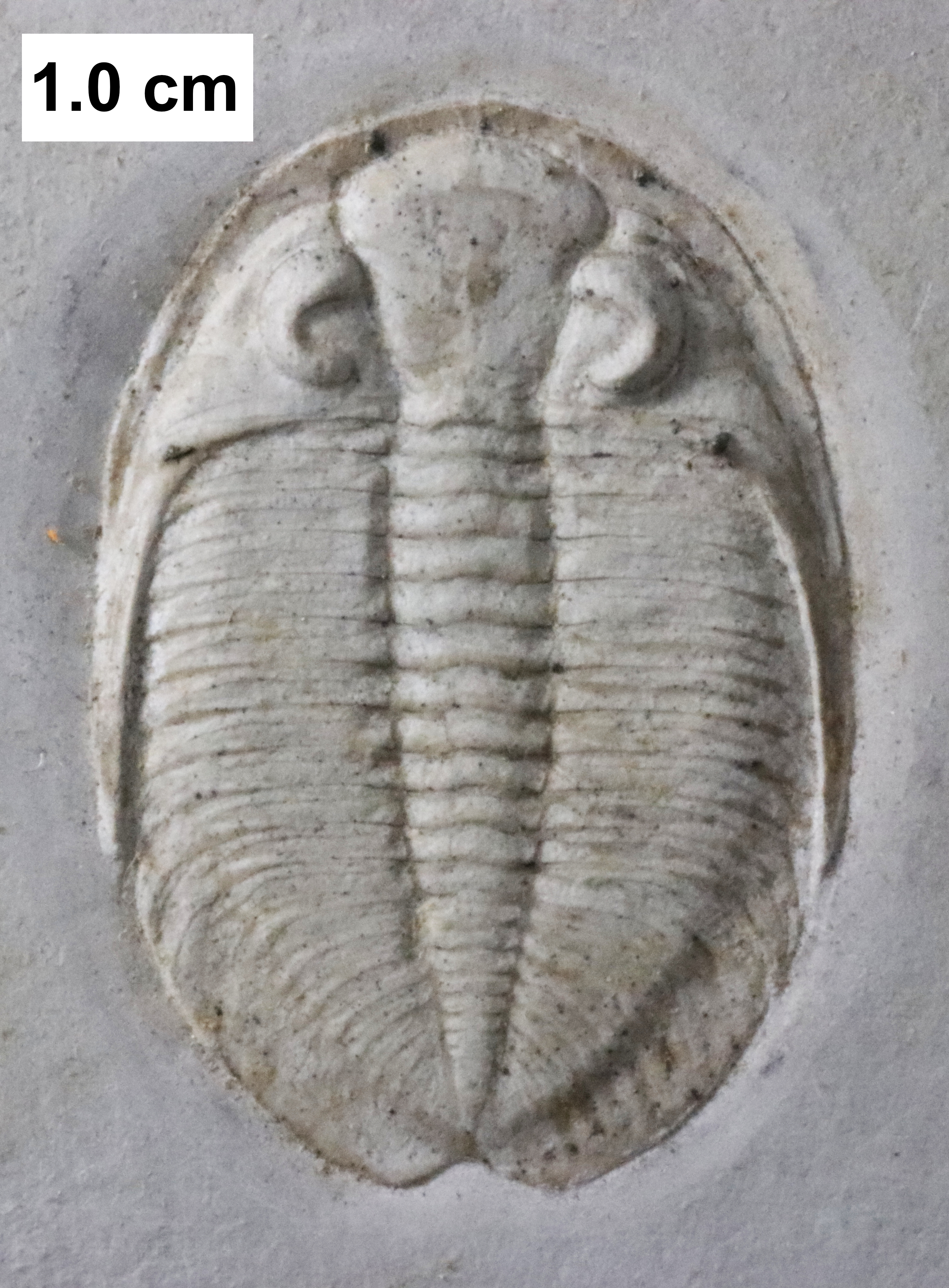
- Fossil specimen of W. eatonae

Scientific classification
- Kingdom: Animalia
- Phylum: Arthropoda
- Clade: †Artiopoda
- Class: †Trilobita
- Order: †Phacopida
- Family: †Dalmanitidae
- Genus: †Waukeshaaspis; Randolfe & Gass, 2024
- Species: †W. eatonae

Binomial name
- †Waukeshaaspis eatonae Randolfe & Gass, 2024

= Waukeshaaspis =

Waukeshaaspis Temporal range: Silurian, Llandoverian (Telychian), 437.4–436.2 Ma

Extinct genus of trilobite

Waukeshaaspis is an extinct genus of trilobite (a diverse group of marine arthropods) known from the lower Silurian aged Waukesha Biota. A single species is currently known, Waukeshaaspis eatonae, which is known from strata belonging to the Telychian aged Brandon Bridge Formation in Wisconsin. Originally discovered alongside the Waukesha Biota in 1985, this genus wouldn't be properly described until 2024. Currently, this genus is placed within the family Dalmanitidae, within the larger Phacopida, which lasted from the Lower Ordovician to the Upper Devonian.

This genus is rather unique, as it is the only common trilobite found within the Waukesha Biota, and is usually preserved in a more complete state compared to other contemporary genera. Its abundance is also notable, with around 200 or so specimens having been recorded, making it one of the most abundant organisms at the site. This arthropod is so common, that entire planes of rock have been found with dozens of preserved exoskeletons. Its sheer abundance suggests that this trilobite was well adapted to the conditions present in the region. This contrasts with the known taphonomic bias that the Waukesha biota has, where hard shelled organisms are either poorly preserved, or absent entirely. Unlike other members of the dalmanitid family, the pygidium (posterior section) of this genus lacks a terminal spine, instead possessing an embayment which may have helped with respiration when the arthropod was enrolled.

== Background ==
The Brandon Bridge Formation is a geologic formation within the state of Wisconsin that dates to the Lower Silurian (more specifically the Telychian and Sheinwoodian stages). Within the formation exists the smaller Waukesha Biota, a Konservat-Lagerstätten fossil site known for its exceptional preservation of soft-bodied and lightly sclerotized organisms that are not normally found in Silurian strata. The biota itself is found within a 12 cm (4.7 in) layer of thinly-laminated, fine-grained, shallow marine sediments consisting of mudstone and dolomite deposited within a sedimentary trap at the end of an erosional scarp over the eroded dolomites of the Schoolcraft and Burnt Bluff Formations. The site itself is known from two quarries; one in Waukesha county, and the other in the city of Franklin, in Milwaukee County. The two faunas are almost identical to one another, with the exception being that the Franklin quarry lacks any fossils of trilobites. A unique trait of the biota is its taphonomy, being that the majority of hard-shelled organisms (which are normally found in Silurian strata), are poorly preserved, or entirely absent. With the exceptions to this being the various trilobites and conulariids (a group of cnidarians with pyramidal theca) from the site. The exceptional preservation of non-biomineralized and lightly sclerotized remains of the Waukesha Biota is generally attributed to a combination of favorable conditions, including the transportation of organisms to a sediment trap that helped to protect from scavengers, and promoted the build up of organic films that coated the surfaces of the dead organisms, which inhibited decay, sometimes enhanced by promoting precipitation of a thin phosphatic coating, which is observed on many of the fossils. However, some of the fossils are also coated with other materials, including pyrite and calcium carbonate.

== Discovery and naming ==
Waukeshaaspis was first discovered alongside the Waukesha Biota in 1985, due to quarrying activity conducted by Waukesha Lime And Stone Company, which revealed the Lagerstätten. Fossils of this genus are only known from the Waukesha quarry, along with the entirety of the other trilobite fossils from the locality. Before it was named, Waukeshaaspis was recognized as one of the most common organisms within the Waukesha Biota, only behind several unnamed members of the Leperditicopida (a group of bivalved arthropods sometimes associated with the ostracods). It was also recognized as a new species due to the unique differences between it and other dalmanitids. Despite its recognition, it would take multiple decades before this genus would receive a proper description, which was published by Randolfe & Gass, 2024. The holotype specimen of Waukeshaaspis, UWGM 7447, and most of the known recorded fossils are currently housed within the UW–Madison Geology Museum, along with the majority of the Waukesha fossils.

This arthropods genus name, Waukeshaaspis, is derived from the city of Waukesha, and the Greek word aspís, meaning "round shield". The specific name, eatonae, is in honour of Carrie Eaton, who is the curator of the UWGM, and has helped to catalogue the Waukesha fossils.

== Description ==
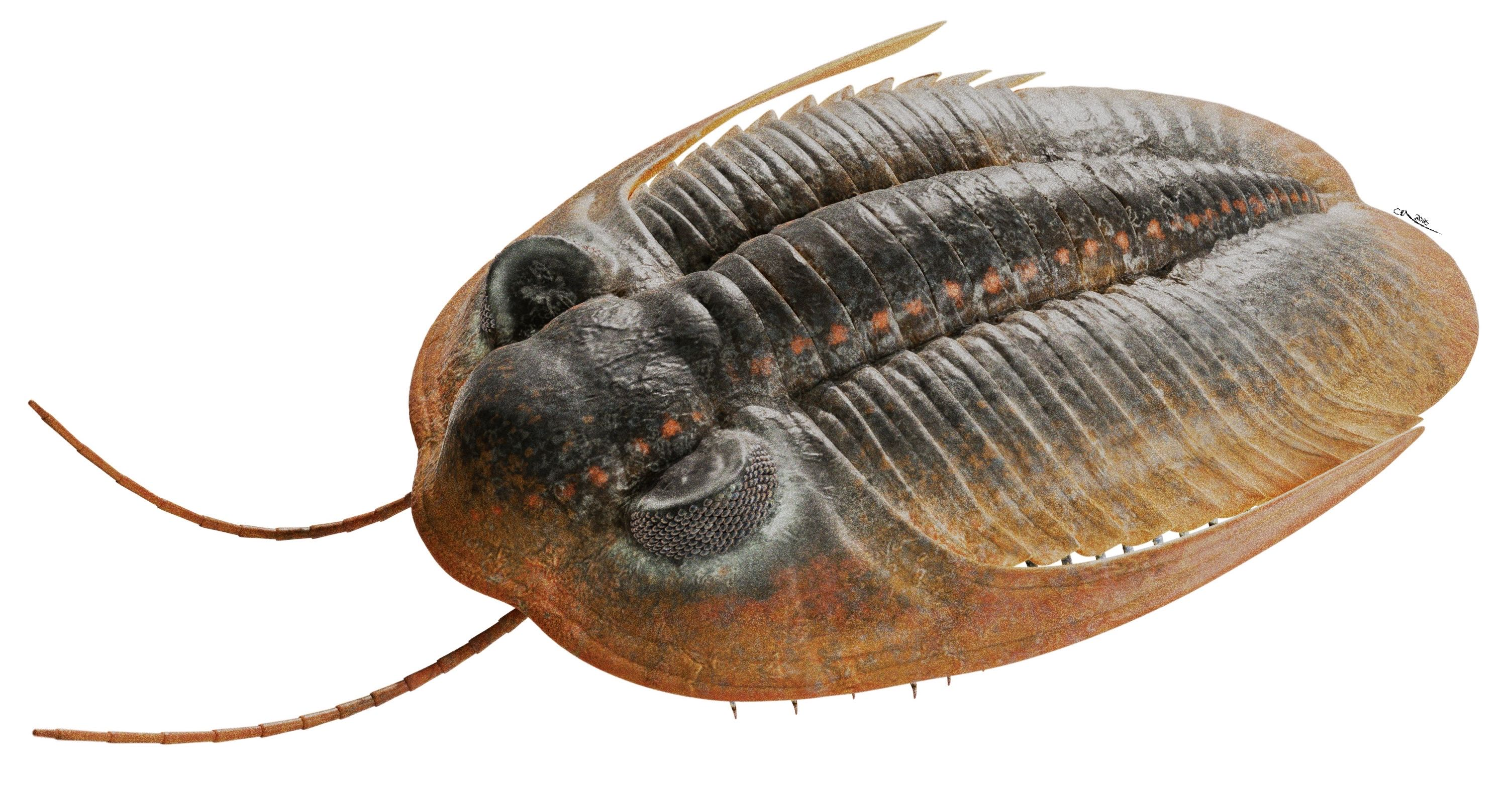
Life reconstruction of W. eatonae

Waukeshaaspis was a modest sized trilobite, with an average length of around 60 mm (6 cm) long, with sizes going down to at least 9 mm (0.9 cm). The cephalon of the trilobite was semi-circular, and possessed very long genal spines that extended down to the beginning of the pygidium. The cephalon also possessed a facial suture that was anterior to the trilobites glabellar region, which would have assisted during ecdysis (or molting), as the librigenal area of the cephalon would split along the suture, exposing the other areas of the trilobites head. The glabella was roughly the same size, in terms of length and width, and would've housed the trilobites crop. The trilobites pair of eyes, which were schizochroal in appearance, sat on the posterior margin of the cephalon, and were composed of around 32 files, which bore eight distinct lenses. The eyes themselves were notably large, and sat on an elevated area of the preocular region of the cephalon. The thorax was composed of around 11 distinct segments, which gradually increased in both length and width before gradually experiencing a decrease in width. The animals pygidium was roughly triangular in shape, and possessed a distinct embayment towards the terminal end, but lacked a terminal spine as seen in most other dalmanitids. The pygidium also possessed around 10 pairs of axial segments and pleurae, but also a smaller, more elongated piece just in front of the embayment. The embayment itself sat towards the posterior-medial area of pygidium, and possessed a gradual curve and narrow shape. Despite the abundance of both dorsal and ventral oriented specimens, no fossils are known which preserve the various appendages, including the antennae, gills, and biramous limbs. The animals hypostome (a hard mouthpart which sat ventral side of the cephalon) is also unknown. Despite this, several fossils of Waukeshaaspis, including UWGM 7460 and UWGM 7461, have been found with preserved gastrointestinal tracts.

== Classification ==
Since its initial discovery, this trilobite has always been referred to the dalmanitidae, but it wasn't until Randolfe & Gass, 2024 when a more in depth review of this species taxonomy was performed. The study found ample evidence for this trilobites placement into the dalmanitid family, due to the number of characteristics shared between it, and other dalmanitid genera. The 2024 study further placed Waukeshaaspis into the Dalmanitinae subfamily, but expressed caution due to the dubious validity of the subfamily. The dalmanitidae as a whole are classified within the larger dalmanitoidea, which also includes the Diaphanometopidae and Prosopiscidae families.

== Paleoecology ==
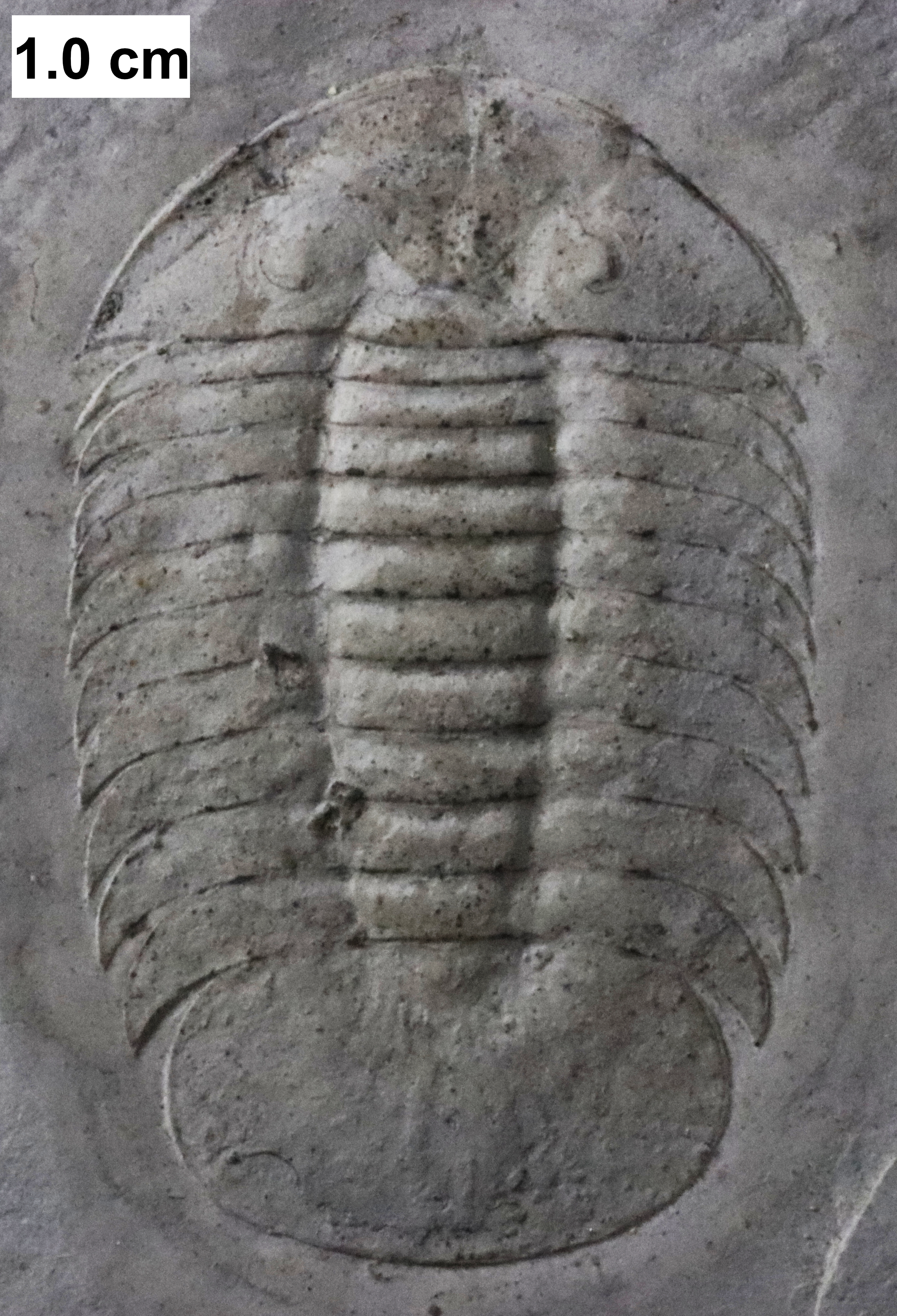
Meroperix, a Styginid trilobite, and a contemporary genus to Waukeshaaspis

Waukeshaaspis represents an anomaly among the other Waukesha trilobites, as many of the other genera known, including Distyrax, Meroperix, and Arctinurus are comparatively more rare, and not as well preserved. This contrasts with Waukeshaaspis, with some specimens, including UWGM 2576 and UWGM 5581, preserving dozens of exoskeletons in close association with one another. These types of specimens have been theorized to represent either mating or molting events for the trilobites. The sheer abundance suggests that this dalmanitid was more tolerant of the conditions in the area, however the lack of trackways, and common mode of preservation suggests that this trilobite did not inhabit the preservational area of the Waukesha Biota, but was potentially carried by currents after death. Interestingly, all of the known specimens of Waukeshaaspis represent trilobites in the holapsid stage of life (mature adults), and the lack of juvenile specimens is most likely a case of preservational bias. Although the preferred diet of Waukeshaaspis is unclear, it can be inferred from other dalmanitids that it was a specialized predator or scavenger. The most notable feature of Waukeshaaspis was the distinct embayment on its pygidium, which contrasts with the terminal spines usually found in dalmanitids. These spines are thought to have aided the trilobites during the enrolling process, as well as during the act of burrowing. Because of this, it was originally hypothesized that Waukeshaaspis was incapable of this action, however, Randolfe & Gass, 2024 suggest that the exceptionally long genal spines of this genus may have filled that role, citing that other dalmanitids with long genal spines, such as Odontochile and Needmorella, either lack or have a reduced terminal spine. The embayment on the pygidium may have filled a number of roles, including aiding respiration, allowing the antennae to protrude out, and for the release of fecal matter.

During the lower Silurian, the area that would become the Waukesha Biota was a shallow, peritidal environment. The benthic area of the region was most likely anoxic, and in combination with oceanic currents, helped to preserve the organisms from the ecosystem. Some notable contemporary organisms include various arthropods (phyllocarids, thylacocephalans, etc.) palaeoscolecids, lobopodians, poriferans, conodonts, and various other groups.
