= UW–Madison Geology Museum =

Natural history museum at the University of Wisconsin-Madison

- Coordinates: 43.070661°N 89.406411°W
- Type: Natural history museum
- Public transit access: Metro Transit
- Website: museum.geoscience.wisc.edu

The UW–Madison Geology Museum (UWGM) is a geology and paleontology museum housed in Weeks Hall, in the southwest part of the University of Wisconsin–Madison campus. The museum's main undertakings are exhibits, outreach to the public, and research. It has the second highest attendance of any museum at the University of Wisconsin–Madison, exceeded only by the Chazen Museum of Art. The museum charges no admission.

== History ==
The museum was founded in the 19th century, and for many years resided with the earth science departments in Science Hall. After the construction of Weeks Hall in the 1970s, the museum moved to its present location in 1981.

== Exhibits ==
Almost 1,000 items are on display in 66 exhibits covering 3,000 square feet (280 m^{2}). Major sections are devoted to rocks and minerals, invertebrate and fish fossils, and vertebrate fossils. There are also cases of glaciers, meteorites, and fossil plants.

Highlights of the museum include:

=== Rocks ===
- An excellent specimen of the mineral kermesite;
- Two glacial erratic pieces of copper weighing hundreds of pounds each;
- A case exhibiting 85 minerals from the recent Greiner donation;
- A blacklight room that shines both long- and short-wave ultraviolet onto rocks, demonstrating fluorescence and phosphorescence;
- A walk-through model of a limestone cave, complete with sound effects.

=== Fossils ===
- A slab of sea floor from the Cretaceous period in Texas, containing impressions of many clams;
- Shells of giant the cephalopod Endoceras from Wisconsin;
- The type specimen of the fossil cephalopod Actinoceras beloitense.
- A window showing the workings of the preparation laboratory, where vertebrate fossils collected in the field are cleaned for storage or display;
- Animals from the Burgess Shale, including the chordate Pikaia, the hyolith Haplophrentis, and fragments of the stem-arthropod Anomalocaris;
- Several skeletons from the Cretaceous Niobrara chalk of Kansas:
  - Hesperornis, a swimming bird with teeth;
  - A slab of chalk containing the shark Squalicorax, including its teeth, vertebrae, and some bones from its last meal;
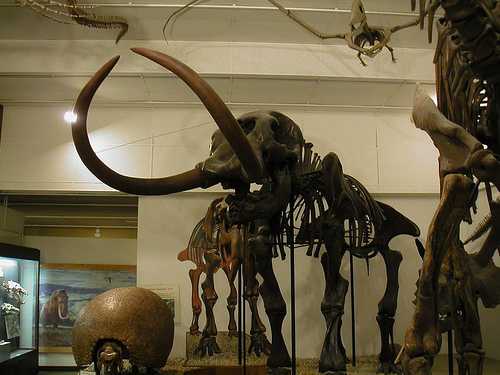
    The Boaz mastodon in the vertebrate fossil room
  - An exceptionally well-preserved slab of a floating colony of the sea lily Uintacrinus;
  - A nearly complete skeleton of the mosasaur Platecarpus, suspended from the ceiling. It has some distinctive pathologies, including injured ribs and a rear right flipper with arthritis;
  - A suspended replica of the pterosaur Pteranodon;
- Vertebrate skeletons from other places:
  - The Permian reptile Captorhinus;
  - A composite skeleton of the duck-billed dinosaur Edmontosaurus, the first dinosaur on display in Wisconsin;
  - The skeleton of an American mastodon, a Pleistocene relative of elephants. It is a composite of bones from two individuals, both found in the 1890s in southwestern Wisconsin. Since one was found near the village of Boaz, the entire composite was once called the Boaz mastodon.

=== Biosignatures exhibit ===
This exhibit highlights the chronology of the Earth and the signal left by life on the planet. Features include

- A block containing debris from the Sudbury impact 1.85 billion years ago
- Stromatolites from the Ordovician of southwestern Wisconsin
- Soft-bodied fossils, such as the enigmatic Grypania and a Silurian-age cycloneuralian worm.
- A large Winogradsky column

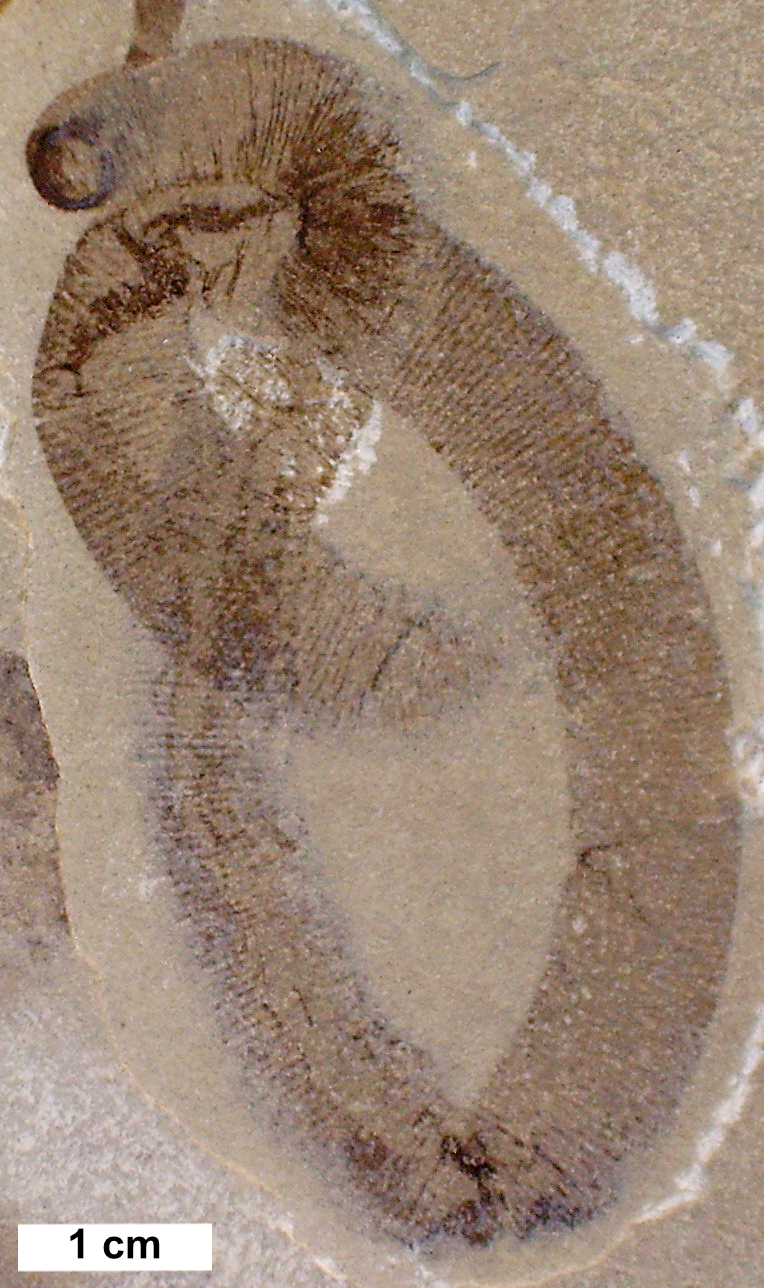
Cycloneuralian worm, misidentified as the earliest leech, from the Silurian Waukesha Biota, Wisconsin.

=== Extraterrestrial exhibits ===
- A large fragment of the Canyon Diablo meteorite that left Meteor Crater in Arizona.
- Several small meteorites, both stony and metallic, that fell in Wisconsin.

== Outreach ==
Every year hundreds of school groups from around the state tour the museum, led by student guides. Staff and students at the museum also travel to schools in the area to teach children and their teachers about geology.

The museum hosts periodic family events, such as the annual Open House. These sometimes have a special theme, such as the one in 2006 that focused on pterosaurs and in 2009 on the Mazon Creek fossils which includes the Tully Monster (Tullimonstrum gregarium).

== Research ==
Wyoming dig

The museum has conducted fossil digs in many Western states. The Late Cretaceous Niobrara Formation in Kansas has yielded many marine fossils. The Hell Creek Formation in Montana and South Dakota has produced duck-billed, horned, and tyrannosaurid dinosaurs, as well as some noteworthy fish.

There is an ongoing summer dig in the Jurassic Morrison Formation in Wyoming, which has produced sauropod and theropod dinosaurs, as well as other remarkable vertebrates.

The museum also conducts local research, such as the study of Pleistocene mammal fossils from Midwestern caves.

== Collections ==
Like most museums, the Geology Museum has far more specimens stored in its collections than on display. It holds a majority of the meteorites ever collected in Wisconsin, and an abundance of rocks and minerals collected by faculty and donated by friends of the museum.

The museum's fossils include impressive collections from the White River Badlands, the Cretaceous Hell Creek Formation, and a remarkable Silurian soft-bodied fauna from a quarry near Waukesha.
