= Waukesha Biota =

Lagerstätte Fossil site in Waukesha County, Wisconsin, U.S.

- Stratigraphic range: Telychian-Sheinwoodian; ~438–433 Ma
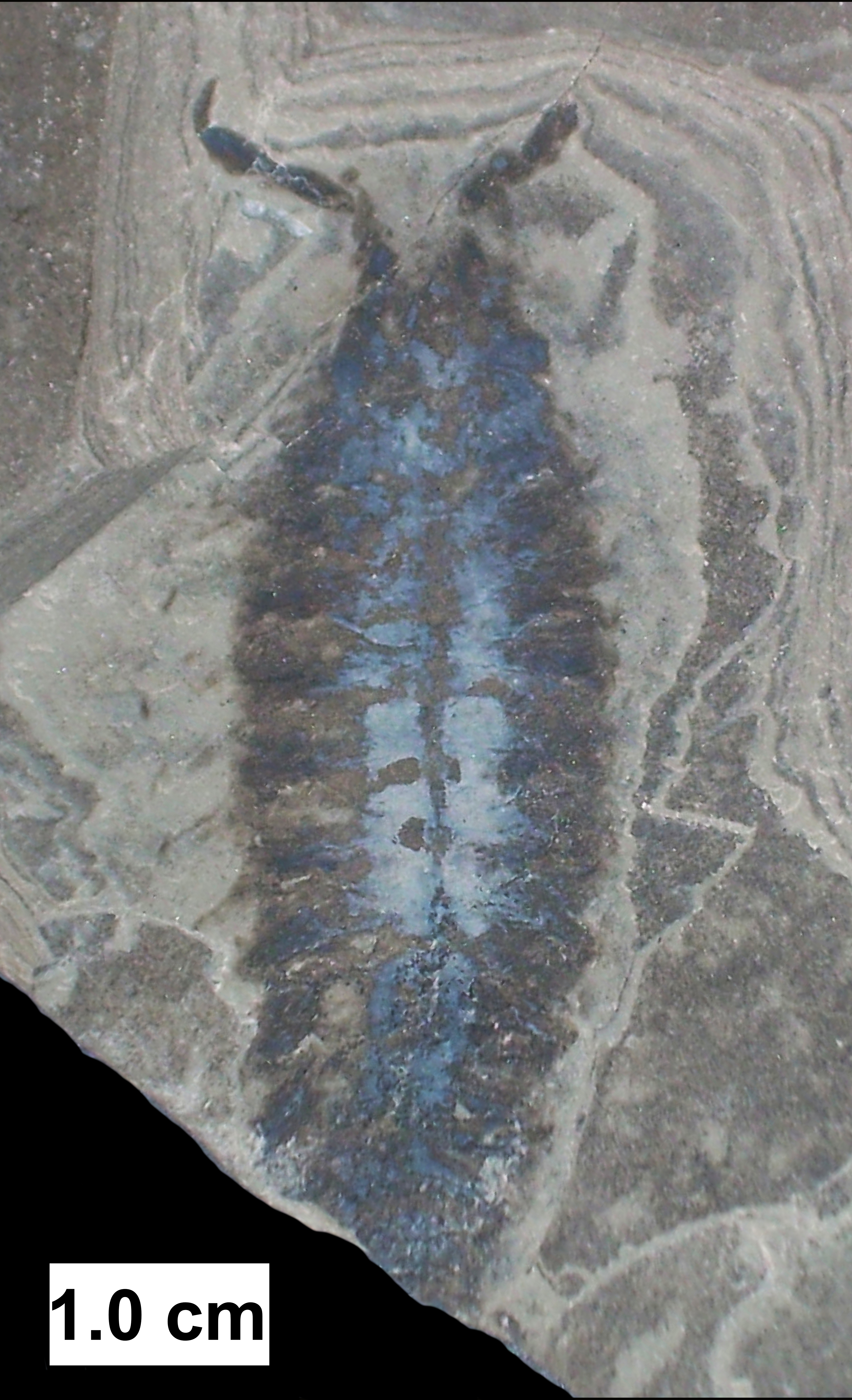
- Parioscorpio venator, an enigmatic arthropod from the Waukesha biota.
- Type: Konservat-Lagerstätte
- Unit of: Brandon Bridge Formation
- Area: Two quarries 32 km (20 mi) apart
- Thickness: 12 cm (4.7 in)

Lithology
- Primary: Finely laminated interbedded mudstone
- Other: Dolomite

Location
- Coordinates: 43°00′42″N 88°13′54″W
- Region: Waukesha County and Franklin, Milwaukee County, Wisconsin
- Country: United States
- Extent: Very localized

Type section
- Named for: Waukesha County, Wisconsin; not to be confused with the Waukesha Formation, which overlies the Brandon Bridge Formation

The Waukesha Biota (also known as Waukesha Lagerstätte, Brandon Bridge Lagerstätte, or Brandon Bridge fauna) is an important fossil site located in Waukesha County and Franklin, Milwaukee County within the state of Wisconsin. This biota is preserved in certain strata within the Brandon Bridge Formation, which dates to the early Silurian period. It is known for the exceptional preservation of soft-bodied organisms, including many species found nowhere else in rocks of similar age. The site's discovery was announced in 1985, leading to a plethora of discoveries. This biota is one of the few well studied Lagerstätten (exceptional fossil sites) from the Silurian, making it important in our understanding of the period's biodiversity. Some of the species are not easily classified into known animal groups, showing that much research remains to be done on this site. Other taxa that are normally common in Silurian deposits are rare here, but trilobites are quite common.

== History and significance ==
The discovery of the Waukesha Biota was first published in 1985 by paleontologists D. G. Mikulic, D. E. G. Briggs, and Joanne Kluessendorf. At the time this site was one of only several known that preserved soft-body parts in fossils. Examples of other sites of this type known at the time were the famous Cambrian aged Burgess shale in British Columbia, and the Carboniferous aged Mazon Creek fossil beds in northern Illinois. This was the only one of its kind known from the Silurian, meaning it was instrumental in the study of early Paleozoic soft-bodied organisms. Since then other Lagerstätten from the Silurian (like the Eramosa lagerstatte) have been found, but none have the same faunal diversity that the Waukesha Biota has. The exceptional preservation of the fossils of the Waukesha Biota thus provides a window to a significant portion of Silurian life that otherwise may have been undetected and therefore unknown to science.

== Stratigraphy and depositional environment ==
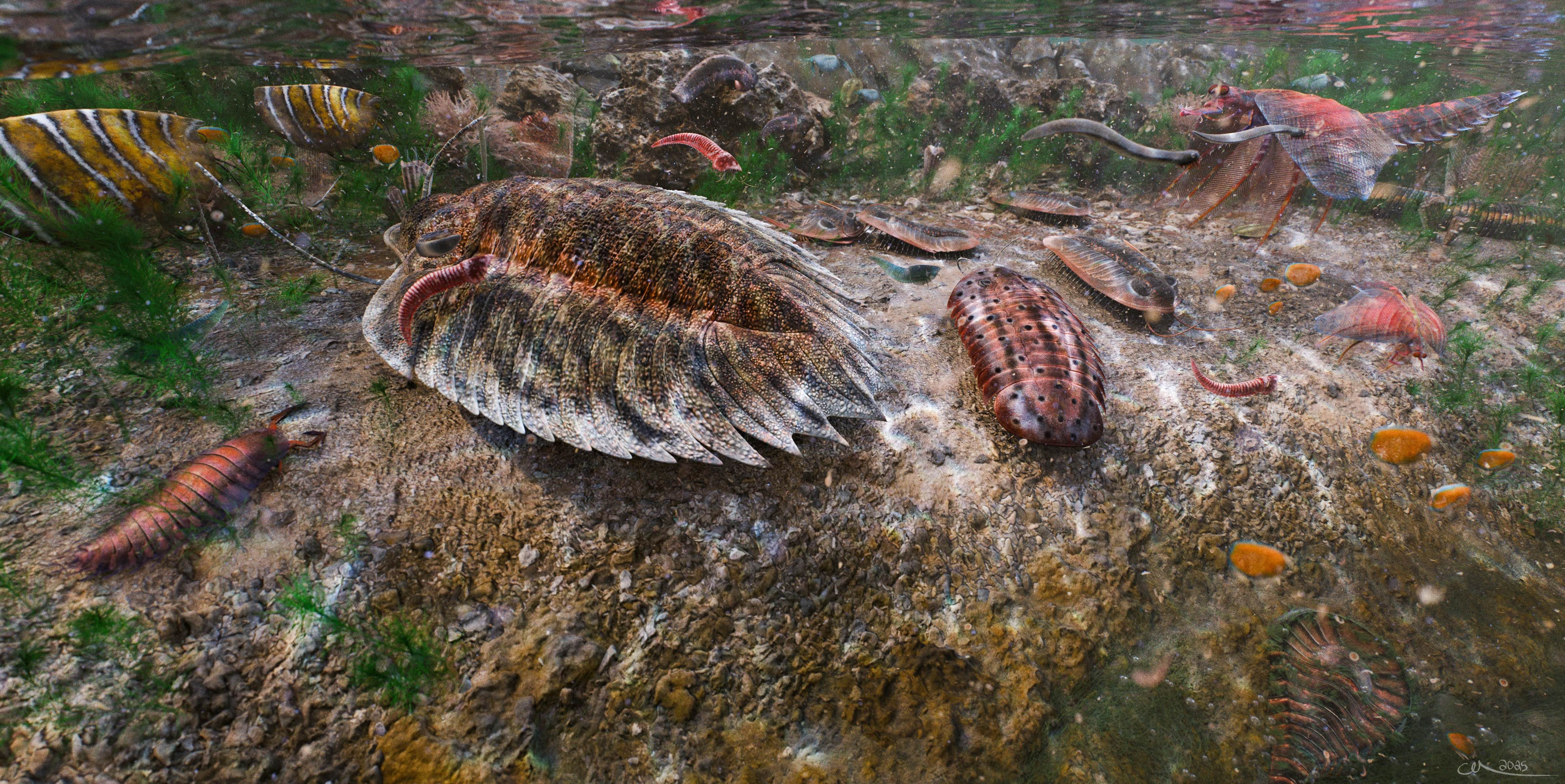
Reconstruction of the Waukesha Biota

Most of the Waukesha Biota is preserved within a 12 cm (4.7 in) layer of thinly-laminated, fine-grained, shallow marine sediments of the Brandon Bridge Formation consisting of mudstone and dolomite deposited in a sedimentary trap at the end of an erosional scarp over the eroded dolomites of the Schoolcraft and Burnt Bluff Formations. A separate thin bed containing the biota is also present about 60 cm (24 in) above the 12 cm (4.7 in) interval. Fossils of unambiguous, fully terrestrial organisms are lacking from the Waukesha Biota. Most of the Waukesha Biota fossils were found at a quarry in Waukesha County, Wisconsin, owned and operated by the Waukesha Lime and Stone Company. Other fossils were collected from a quarry in Franklin, Milwaukee County, owned and operated by Franklin Aggregate Inc. That quarry lies 32 km (20 mi) south of the quarry in Waukesha. The Franklin fossils were from blasted material apparently originating from a horizon and setting equivalent to that of the Waukesha site. Its biota is similar to that from the Waukesha site, except that it lacks trilobites.

== Taphonomy ==
Taphonomy is the study of how organisms decay and become fossilized or preserved in the paleontological record. The taphonomy of the Waukesha Biota is unusual in preserving few of the kinds of animals that typically dominate the Silurian fossil record, including in other strata of the same two quarries. Fossils of corals, echinoderms, brachiopods, bryozoans, gastropods, bivalves, and cephalopods are rare or absent from the Waukesha Biota, although trilobites are diverse and common. This is because of the preservation bias this site has where soft bodied and lightly skeletonized organisms preserve more often than hard shelled organisms. The complete opposite when compared to the taphonomy of most other fossil sites.

The exceptional preservation of non-biomineralized and lightly sclerotized remains of the Waukesha Biota is generally attributed to a combination of favorable conditions, including the transportation of the organisms to a sediment trap that was hostile to scavengers but favorable to the production of organic films that coated the surfaces of the dead organisms, which inhibited decay, sometimes enhanced by promoting precipitation of a thin phosphatic coating, which is observed on many of the fossils.

== Biota ==
=== Alga ===
One genus of dasycladalean alga is known from the lagerstätte.

Alga
Genus	Phylum	Higher taxon	Abundance	Notes	Images
Jimaodanus	Alga	Dasycladales		A genus of dasycladalean alga of the family Triploporellaceae. This genus is notable for showing that dasycladalean algae underwent a massive radiation during the early Paleozoic. Originally named as Heterocladus.	

=== Hemichordata ===
Many of the hemichordates are members of the group Graptolithina.

Hemichordata
Genus	Phylum	Higher taxon	Abundance	Notes	Images
Desmograptus	Hemichordata	Graptolithina		A graptolite of the order Dendroidea that is characterized by its unique branching pattern and conical rhabdosomes.	
Dictyonema	Hemichordata	Graptolithina		A graptolite of the order Dendroidea. These colonial organisms are characterized by a conical, net-like structure. The colonies (known as rhabdosomes) are branched and may vary from almost discoidal to almost cylindrical. They were stationary planktonic suspension feeders.	
Oktavites	Hemichordata	Graptolithina		A graptolite of the family Monograptidae that formed a spiral-like pattern.	
Thallograptus?	Hemichordata	Graptolithina		A graptolite of the order Dendroidea that formed branching structures, and often incrusted other organisms.	

=== Porifera ===
Poriferans, also known as sea sponges, are rare in this locality, with only one specimen known.

Porifera
Genus / Taxon	Phylum	Higher taxon	Abundance	Notes	Images
To be determined	Porifera	To be determined	1 specimen (known as UWGM 3126)	One specimen of a poriferan, or sea sponge, has been found in this locality. It has a mesh-like skeleton consisting of longitudinal strands. These characteristics suggest a possible placement with either the vauxiids or the anthaspidellids.	

=== Cnidaria ===
The cnidarians of the site are mainly represented by conulariids, but coral are also known.

Cnidaria
Genus / Taxon	Phylum	Higher taxon	Abundance	Notes	Images
Metaconularia	Cnidaria	Staurozoa		A genus of conulariid, which are a somewhat enigmatic group that are now considered possible members of the group Staurozoa. In this image, figures A and B show specimens of Metaconularia.	
Conularia	Cnidaria	Staurozoa		Conularia is the type genus of the conulariid group, and the main species found at this site is Conularia niagarensis.	
Sphenothallus	Cnidaria	Staurozoa		A problematic genus lately attributed to the holdfasts (attachment points) of conulariids. This fossil is found throughout rocks of the Paleozoic.	
Tabulata	Cnidaria	Anthozoa		Fossils of undetermined tabulate corals are rare in this biota, but their poor preservation prevents precise identification.	

=== Echinodermata ===
Echinoderm fossils are rare at the site, but crinoids have been found here.

Echinodermata
Genus / Taxon	Phylum	Higher taxon	Abundance	Notes	Images
Crinoidea	Echinodermata	Crinozoa		Crinoid fossils are rare at the site, but at least one complete decalcified specimen is known from the site.	

=== Brachiopoda ===
Like many of the hard shelled organisms known from this site, the brachiopods found here are poorly preserved and rare.

Brachiopoda
Genus / Taxon	Phylum	Higher taxon	Abundance	Notes	Images
Rhynchonellida	Brachiopoda	Rhynchonellida		Fossils of articulate brachiopods that have been found at the site have been tentatively assigned to the still living group Rhynchonellida.	
Orbiculoidea	Brachiopoda	Lingulida		Inarticulate brachiopods from this site have been confidentially assigned to the genus Orbiculoidea.	

=== Cephalopoda ===
Normally common in Silurian deposits, nautiloid cephalopods are known from only a handful of specimens from the Waukesha biota.

Cephalopoda
Genus	Phylum	Higher taxon	Abundance	Notes	Images
To be determined	Mollusca	Kionoceratinae		A cephalopod shell found at the site has been interpreted as belonging to the family Kionoceratinae based on its structure and appearance.	
To be determined	Mollusca	To be determined		Another cephalopod shell is known, but due to it being an internal mold, and being poorly preserved, it has been not assigned to any specific families.	

=== "Worms" ===
Multiple soft bodied fossils of "worms" and other vermiform animals are known from the site.

"Worms"
Genus	Phylum	Higher taxon	Abundance	Notes	Images
Macromyzon	Annelida	Hirudinea	A singular holotype specimen (UWGM 7056)	A stem-group hirudinean annelid, and the oldest known leech. This animal was most likely not hematophagous and probably fed on live prey.	
To be determined	Annelida	Polychaeta		Many fossils of multiple polychaete worms are known from the site, and represent many different groups. Some fossils represent members of the family Aphroditidae, and others have bodies covered in spines.	
To be determined	Palaeoscolecida	To be determined		Specimens of vermiform nature from the site have been found and interpreted as members of the palaeoscolecida grouping (which were extinct ecdysozoan worms resembling armoured priapulids). These are some of the most common worms from this locality, with up to 30 fossils known.	
To be determined	Lobopodia	To be determined		Lobopodians are not "traditional" worms, but are instead panarthropods with stubby legs. Some of these fossils were at one point attributed to myriapods. Over 40 specimens are known, which show that the animal was around 4 cm long, and possessed short legs. Based on known fossil material, it seems that there are multiple different species known.	
To be determined	Uncertain	Cycloneuralia	At least one specimen	An annulated worm. It was thought that it might represent a leech, which if true would make this specimen the earliest known leech in the fossil record, although available characters are limited so it is hard to identify. Shcherbakov et al. (2020) considered it to be a cycloneuralian, possibly a member of the family Ancalagonidae. The specimen was found with a circular structure at one end interpreted as a sucker; however, Braddy, Gass & Tessler (2023) reinterpreted the purported suckered end as a breakage, and consider the specimen to be a molt of a member of Cycloneuralia of uncertain affinities, possibly a priapulid. Its large size, at up to 24-mm wide suggests a predatory lifestyle.	

=== Arthropoda ===
Arthropods dominate the fauna of the Waukesha biota in both number of specimens and diversity. A wide variety including crustaceans, trilobites, chelicerates, and less familiar groups like the thylacocephalans and cheloniellids are known. Also found are enigmatic arthropods whose taxonomy has puzzled paleontologists since the sites discovery.

Arthropoda
Genus	Phylum	Higher taxon	Abundance	Notes	Images
Waukeshaaspis	Arthropoda	Trilobita		Waukeshaaspis eatonae is a dalmanitid trilobite commonly found with its dorsal exoskeleton intact. It is sometimes seen in such large numbers that they cover immense surfaces of sediments. It is one of the most abundant arthropods from the site. Other trilobite taxa found in this biota include: Stenopareia, Meroperix, Leonaspis, Scotoharpes, Arctinurus, Distyrax, a calymenid, a phacopid, an otarionid, a cheirurid, and a proetid.	
To be determined	Arthropoda	Cheloniellida		A fossil of a possible cheloniellid (a group of arthropods close to trilobites) has been found in the Waukesha biota. This and other fossils were given the name of "Latromirus tridens" in 2014, but the name was not accepted by the ICZN due to its naming not complying with its guidelines. Later on, all but one of those fossils were reassigned to unrelated genera from this site, leaving only one fossil (UWGM 2439) as a possible cheloniellid.	
Ceratiocaris	Arthropoda	Phyllocarida		Phyllocarids are a group of primitive crustaceans that first appeared in the Cambrian period and survived to the present day. Three species of phyllocarids are part of the Waukesha Biota, consisting of Ceratiocaris macroura, C. papilio, and C. pusilla. Although these bivalved crustaceans are not new to science, their fossils preserve the delicate appendages and further show the diversity of the lightly biomineralized fossils of the Waukesha Biota.	
Multiple species	Arthropoda	Leperditicopida		The most abundant arthropods from this site are unnamed leperditicopids that are often preserved as splayed valves. At least two species are present, with the larger of the two reaching about 12-mm in length.	
Venustulus	Arthropoda	Chelicerata	Eight specimens	Venustulus is a genus of synziphosurine, a paraphyletic group of fossil chelicerate arthropods. Venustulus was regarded as part of the clade Prosomapoda. This arthropod appears to be blind due to the lack of eyes on its carapace, suggesting it lived either in deep water or buried in the sediments. Unlike modern horseshoe crabs, the prosomal appendages of Venustulus covered less of the total carapace length. The animal's carapace is semi-circular in shape and has a procurved posterior area.	
To be determined	Arthropoda	Chelicerata		There is another possible synziphosurine known from these deposits, but because of the fragmentary state of the remains, they cannot be confidently described as a separate genus from Venustulus.	
Thylacares	Arthropoda	Thylacocephala	Six specimens	Thylacares is a genus of thylacocephalan (a grouping of primitive mandibulate arthropods) that most likely lived as a nektonic predator. This animal shares many features with other thylacocephalans (like raptorial appendages, a bivalved carapace, and compound eyes). Thylacares means "Small pouch" in reference to the small eyes and stomach seen in the species. The species' trunk is composed of about 22 segments. Originally this genus was thought to have been the oldest known thylacocephalan.	
To be determined	Arthropoda	Incertae sedis	At least one specimen (UWGM 2450)	A rare vermiform arthropod is known from the biota. It is around 10 cm in length, and possesses a pair of antenniform appendages on its head.	
Acheronauta	Arthropoda	Mandibulata	Twenty-three specimens	Acheronauta is a vermiform arthropod that has a multisegmented trunk region, a cephalic carapace, raptorial appendages, a pair of antennae, and two compound eyes. This animal was interpreted as a sister taxa to the thylacocephalans. Acheronauta has also been assessed as a possible basal mandibulate, which are distinguished from other arthropods due to the presence of mandibles. While its specific placement in the mandibulate family tree has not been fully known, it is accepted to occupy a position near the base of the grouping.	
Waukartus	Arthropoda	Mandibulata	Thirty-five specimens	Waukartus is a stem-group myriapod that inhabited marine substrates yet already presented walking uniramous limbs, indicating that the loss of exopods likely occurred prior to the terrestrialization of the total-group myriapods.	
Parioscorpio	Arthropoda	incertae sedis		Parioscorpio is an enigmatic arthropod from this site that has stirred up scientific debate since it was first discovered in 1985, decades before it was named. The groups that this creature has been included in are (remipedia, branchiopoda, cheloniellida, and arachnida). This creature's name stems from its initial description in 2020 when it was described as a primitive scorpion. The animal reached a length of around 1.6–4.5 cm (0.63–1.77 in) long. It is characterized by a trapezoidal head with a pair of eyes located antero-medially, a pair of enlarged raptorial appendages (previously thought to be scorpion's clawed pedipalps), as well as another pair of small appendages. Central to the head was a mouth-covering hypostome and a pair of muscular blocks articulated to the raptorial appendages. Based on its gnathobases, it seems that it hunted prey like trilobites and worms.	
Papiliomaris	Arthropoda	incertae sedis	Twelve specimens	One of the more mysterious organisms from this site is a currently unnamed bivalved arthropod. This creature has been given the nickname of the "Butterfly animal" by some subsequent studies on the sites fauna. An unpublished abstract has also given it the name "Papiliomaris". This is due to the appearance this creature has to the completely unrelated lepidopteran insects. One of the more supported hypotheses that paleontologists have made on this arthropod's taxonomy is that it is some kind of crustacean, with some suggesting it could be related to phyllocarids, but whether these similarities are just superficial is still being studied. Most specimens known preserve the "Open-valve position", but one specimen does preserve the lateral view. In 2025, Anderson et al., (2025) officially described it under the name Papiliomaris kluessendorfae and found it to be in a stem-group at the base of Euarthropoda.	

=== Chordata ===
Multiple chordate fossils (possibly belonging to conodonts) are known from this site.

Chordata
Genus	Phylum	Higher taxon	Abundance	Notes	Images
Panderodus	Chordata	Conodonta	a singular specimen (UW4001/7a+b)	A bedding plane assemblage of Panderodus conodont elements and associated soft tissues including myomeres was found in the Waukesha Biota. Grooves on the elements were suggested to possibly accommodate the flow of venom, but this function is not supported by other evidence. At the time of its discovery, the Waukesha Biota was only the second occurrence known to produce the soft parts of a conodont. The fossil belonged to the species P. unicostatus, and revealed that this species was most likely a macrophagous predator. Unlike other conodonts, this species appears to have been dorso-ventrally flattened, a contrast to the other conodonts known from trunk remains.	
To be determined	Chordata	Conodonta?		Numerous, well-preserved chordate fossils that may also be conodont animals were later found in the Waukesha Biota at Franklin Quarry.	

== See also ==
- Eramosa lagerstätte, a middle Silurian aged lagerstätte in Ontario, Canada
- Soom Shale lagerstätte, an Upper Ordovician aged lagerstätte in South Africa
