= Boaz mastodon and Anderson Mills mastodon =

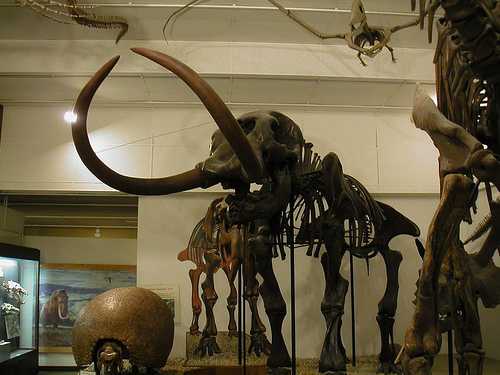
The Boaz Mastodon on display at the UW-Madison Geology Museum

The Boaz mastodon is the skeleton of a mastodon found near Boaz, Wisconsin, USA, in 1897. A fluted quartzite spear point found near the Boaz mastodon suggests that humans hunted mastodons in southwestern Wisconsin. It is currently on display at the University of Wisconsin Geology Museum.

Although the mastodon on display at the Geology Museum has long been presented as a complete individual, it was uncovered in 2015 that two bones from the Boaz mastodon were combined with many bones from a different individual, the Anderson Mills mastodon, to form a composite skeleton.

== History ==
Following a heavy rainfall on July 10, 1897, the sons (Harry, Chris, Verne, and Clyde) of farmer John Dosch were checking for flood damage along the eastern branch of Mill Creek near the village of Boaz when they discovered some unusual bones sticking out of the creek bank where it had been partially washed away. The boys excavated the bones and displayed them by a hitching post near the road. The local mailman spread the word about the find and the following week stories about it appeared in the Republican Observer, the Richland Democrat, and the Viola Observer. What was described as an arrowhead was found in clay near a rib. The bones were moved to the basement of the Dosch farmhouse. Later, Frank Burnham, a Richland Center, Wisconsin, attorney and member of the state legislature, negotiated the sale of the bones to the State of Wisconsin for fifty dollars. The skeleton, which is about two-thirds complete and missing its tusks, was reconstructed in 1915 by M. G. Mehl and G. M. Schwartz and is housed in the Geology Museum of the University of Wisconsin. It is estimated that the Boaz mastodon was eighteen feet long, stood nine and a quarter feet high, and weighed six to eight tons.

The arrowhead did not accompany the bones when they were sent to the University of Wisconsin. In the 1940s the University received an envelope containing a quartzite spear point. The return address on the envelope was D. C. L. Dosch, Maysville, Missouri, and scribbled on the envelope was "allegidly found with U.W. elephant". In 1962, the two surviving Dosch brothers identified the point as like the one they had found 66 years previously. The fluted spear point is made of quartzite from the Silver Mound Archeological District which is about 80 miles north of Boaz.

== Age of skeletons ==
Accelerator mass spectrometry yielded radiocarbon dates for both skeletons. It found the Anderson Mills mastodon dated to 12,910 ± 150 calendar years BP. Meanwhile, the Boaz mastodon is one of the most recent ever found, and dated to 12,220 ± 190 calendar years BP.
