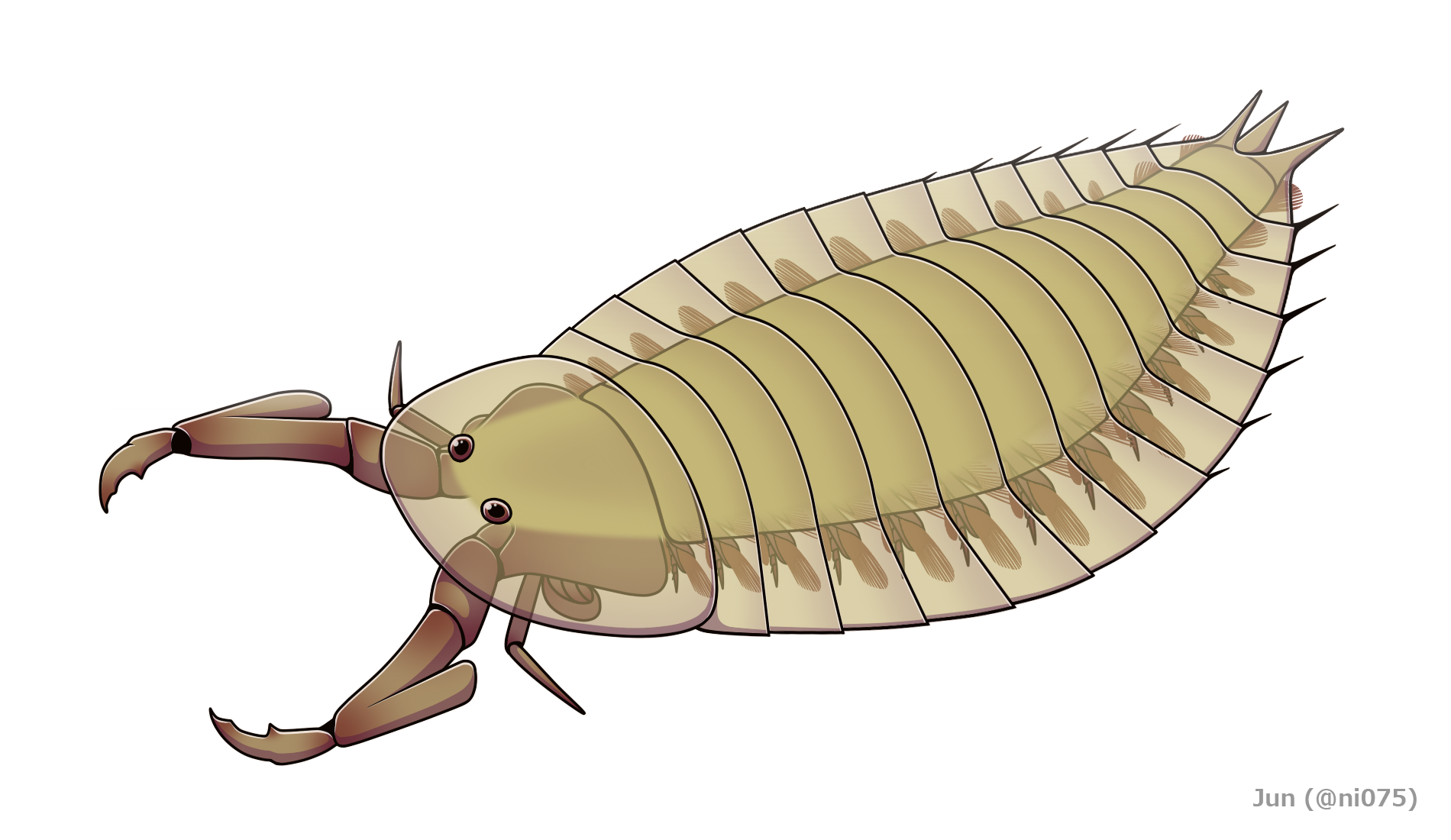
- Reconstruction as a non-scorpion, enigmatic arthropod
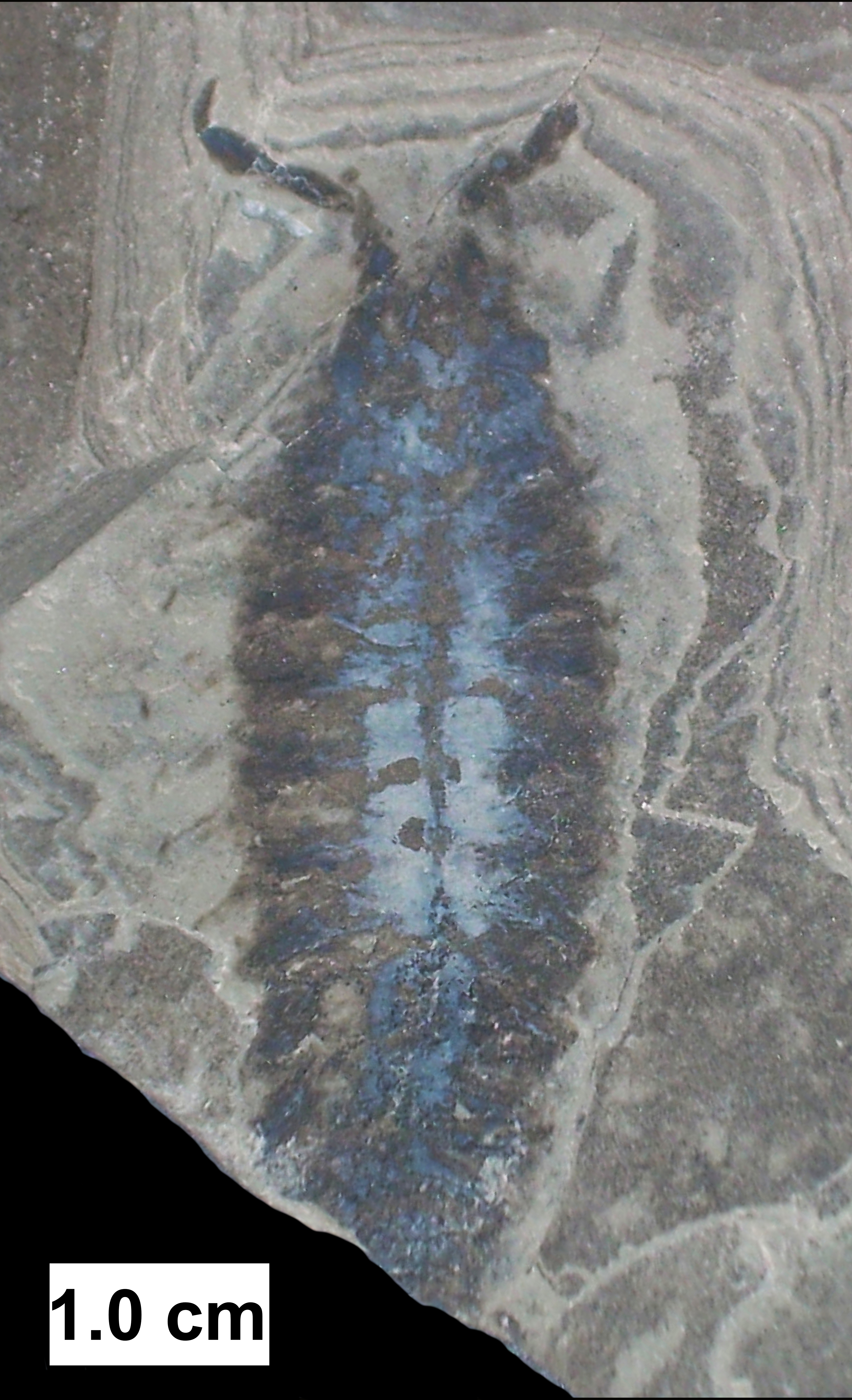
- Fossil specimen of P. venator

Scientific classification
- Kingdom: Animalia
- Phylum: Arthropoda
- Class: incertae sedis
- Genus: †Parioscorpio; Wendruff et al, 2020

Type species
- †Parioscorpio venator Wendruff et al, 2020

= Parioscorpio =

Parioscorpio Temporal range: Silurian (Telychian), 437.5–436.5 Ma

Extinct genus of enigmatic arthropod

Parioscorpio is an extinct genus of arthropod containing the species P. venator known from the Silurian-aged Waukesha Biota of the Brandon Bridge Formation near Waukesha, Wisconsin. This animal has gone through a confusing taxonomic history, being called an arachnid, crustacean, and an artiopodan arthropod at various points. This animal is one of the more famous fossil finds from Wisconsin, due to the media coverage it received based on its original description in 2020 as a basal scorpion.

== Taxonomy ==
The fossils were originally discovered in 1985, tentatively identified as a branchiopod or remipede crustacean but were neglected for decades. In 2016, some of the fossils now assigned to Parioscorpio were given the name Latromirus and were assigned to an extinct group of early Paleozoic arthropods known as cheloniellids in a Ph.D dissertation, but the name was never published in a peer-reviewed journal and is therefore not valid in accordance with the International Code of Zoological Nomenclature. The fossils known as “Latromirus” were also mistakenly named “Xus yus” in a preprint of a separate paper. Upon initial publication in 2020, Parioscorpio was considered the world's oldest and most primitive known scorpion, older than Dolichophonus from Scotland by several million years. In 2021, the fossils were reanalysed, and Parioscorpio was found not to be a scorpion, but an arthropod of uncertain placement, outside of Mandibulata, Chelicerata and all other groups of extinct arthropods (e.g. Megacheira, Fuxianhuiida, Artiopoda and so on).

In 2021 another paper stated that Parioscorpio venator, including the fossils previously called Latromirus, might be a cheloniellid, which is a subgroup of Artiopoda. However in 2022, its affinity as cheloniellid is questioned, and firmly rejected from that clade. Currently the most resolved tree in the paper considered P. venator as an enigmatic stem-group arthropod.

In 2022 a study was published describing Acheronauta stimulapis, a new species of possible mandibulate arthropod from the biota. While coding the phylogenetic trees for this arthropod, the authors of the paper also included Parioscorpio, and all of the trees preformed presented this creature as a basal taxon of arthropod that sat in between the groups Artiopoda and Mandibulata. This discovery actually is consistent with the rejection of P. venator as a cheloniellid. As of 2023, P. venator is regarded as a basal euarthropod.

== Morphology ==
Movement of the raptorial appendages of P. venator

The animal is around 1.6–4.5 cm (0.63–1.77 in) long. It is characterized by a trapezoidal head with a pair of eyes located antero-medially, a pair of enlarged raptorial appendages (previously thought to be scorpion's clawed pedipalps), as well as another pair of small appendages. Central to the head was a mouth-covering hypostome and a pair of muscular blocks articulated to the raptorial appendages. The trunk is composed of 14 segments, each associated with a pair of thin pleurae (lateral extension of tergite) and appendages. The first segment is covered by the head while the posterior segments may have lateral spines. The anterior 12 pairs of trunk appendages are multiramus (each composed of 4 bundles of setae and a segmented endopod) while the last two pairs are simple fan-like structures. The trunk ends with 3 spines.

== Paleoecology ==
Parioscorpio may have been a marine or brackish water predator, using an ambush prey-capture method similar to extant waterbugs (Nepomorpha). It would have lived alongside many other bizarre organisms like the Conodont Panderodus, the enigmatic Papiliomaris, the thylacocephalan Thylacares, early synziphosurans, and Trilobites.
