= Boaz, Wisconsin =

- Village
- Location of Boaz in Richland County, Wisconsin.
- Coordinates: 43°19′51″N 90°31′38″W
- Country: United States
- State: Wisconsin
- County: Richland

Area
  - Total: 0.36 sq mi (0.93 km^{2})
  - Land: 0.36 sq mi (0.93 km^{2})
  - Water: 0 sq mi (0.00 km^{2})
- Elevation: 751 ft (229 m)

Population (2020)
  - Total: 129
  - Density: 360/sq mi (140/km^{2})
- Time zone: UTC-6 (Central (CST))
  - Summer (DST): UTC-5 (CDT)
- Area code: 608
- FIPS code: 55-08600
- GNIS feature ID: 1561987
- Website: https://www.boazwi.gov/

Boaz is a village in Richland County, Wisconsin, United States. According to the 2020 census, the population of the village was 129.

== Geography ==
Boaz is located at 43°19′51″N 90°31′38″W (43.330793, -90.527280).

According to the United States Census Bureau, the village has a total area of 0.36 square miles (0.93 km^{2}), all land.

== History ==
Boaz was the boyhood home of Richard M. Brewer, the first leader of the Regulators in the Lincoln County (New Mexico) War. A skeleton of a mastodon, the Boaz mastodon, was found in 1897, near Boaz.

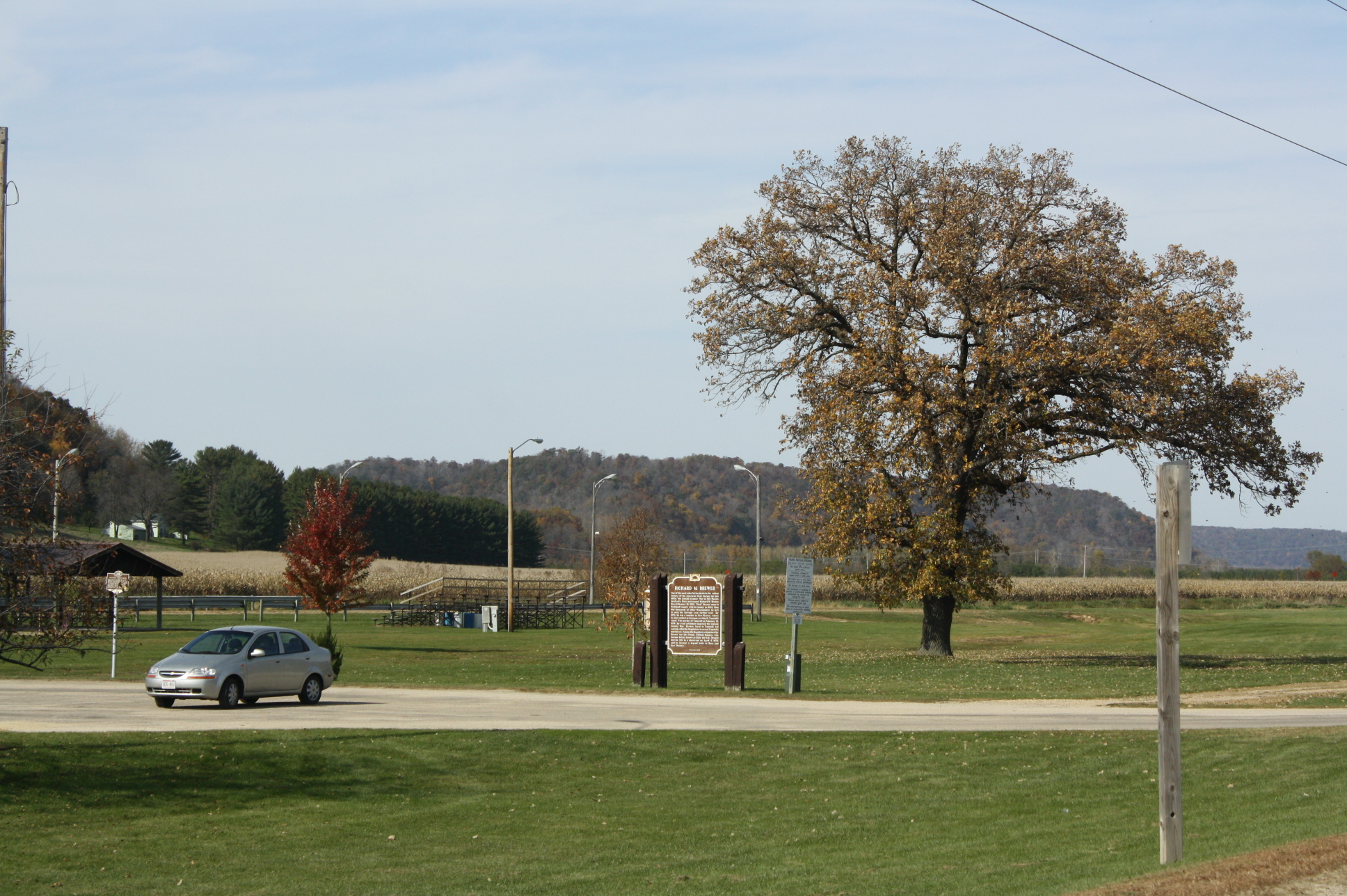
Boaz Community Park, with historical marker for Richard M. Brewer

== Demographics ==
Historical population
Census	Pop.	Note	%±
1880	75		—
1940	230		—
1950	188		−18.3%
1960	117		−37.8%
1970	126		7.7%
1980	161		27.8%
1990	131		−18.6%
2000	137		4.6%
2010	156		13.9%
2020	129		−17.3%
U.S. Decennial Census

=== 2010 census ===
As of the census of 2010, there were 156 people, 67 households, and 40 families living in the village. The population density was 433.3 inhabitants per square mile (167.3/km^{2}). There were 68 housing units at an average density of 188.9 per square mile (72.9/km^{2}). The racial makeup of the village was 98.7% White and 1.3% Asian. Hispanic or Latino of any race were 0.6% of the population.

There were 67 households, of which 20.9% had children under the age of 18 living with them, 50.7% were married couples living together, 4.5% had a female householder with no husband present, 4.5% had a male householder with no wife present, and 40.3% were non-families. 29.9% of all households were made up of individuals, and 9% had someone living alone who was 65 years of age or older. The average household size was 2.33 and the average family size was 2.75.

The median age in the village was 49.3 years. 19.2% of residents were under the age of 18; 7% were between the ages of 18 and 24; 19.3% were from 25 to 44; 32.1% were from 45 to 64; and 22.4% were 65 years of age or older. The gender makeup of the village was 52.6% male and 47.4% female.

=== 2000 census ===
As of the census of 2000, there were 137 people, 64 households, and 41 families living in the village. The population density was 383.2 people per square mile (146.9/km^{2}). There were 67 housing units at an average density of 187.4 per square mile (71.9/km^{2}). The racial makeup of the village was 99.27% White and 0.73% Native American.

There were 64 households, out of which 28.1% had children under the age of 18 living with them, 45.3% were married couples living together, 10.9% had a female householder with no husband present, and 35.9% were non-families. 26.6% of all households were made up of individuals, and 7.8% had someone living alone who was 65 years of age or older. The average household size was 2.14 and the average family size was 2.61.

In the village, the population was spread out, with 21.2% under the age of 18, 10.2% from 18 to 24, 29.9% from 25 to 44, 24.1% from 45 to 64, and 14.6% who were 65 years of age or older. The median age was 40 years. For every 100 females, there were 95.7 males. For every 100 females age 18 and over, there were 89.5 males.

The median income for a household in the village was $31,563, and the median income for a family was $32,000. Males had a median income of $22,500 versus $22,500 for females. The per capita income for the village was $16,883. There were 16.7% of families and 13.2% of the population living below the poverty line, including 41.7% of under eighteens and none of those over 64.

== Images ==
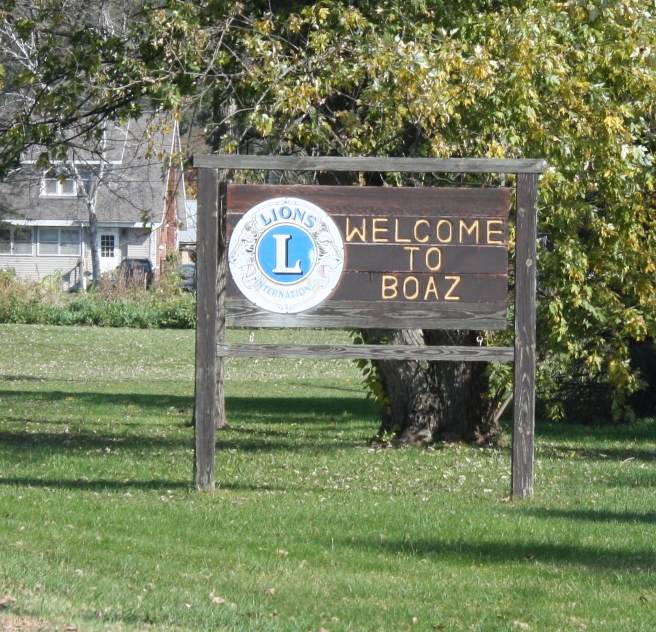
Welcome sign

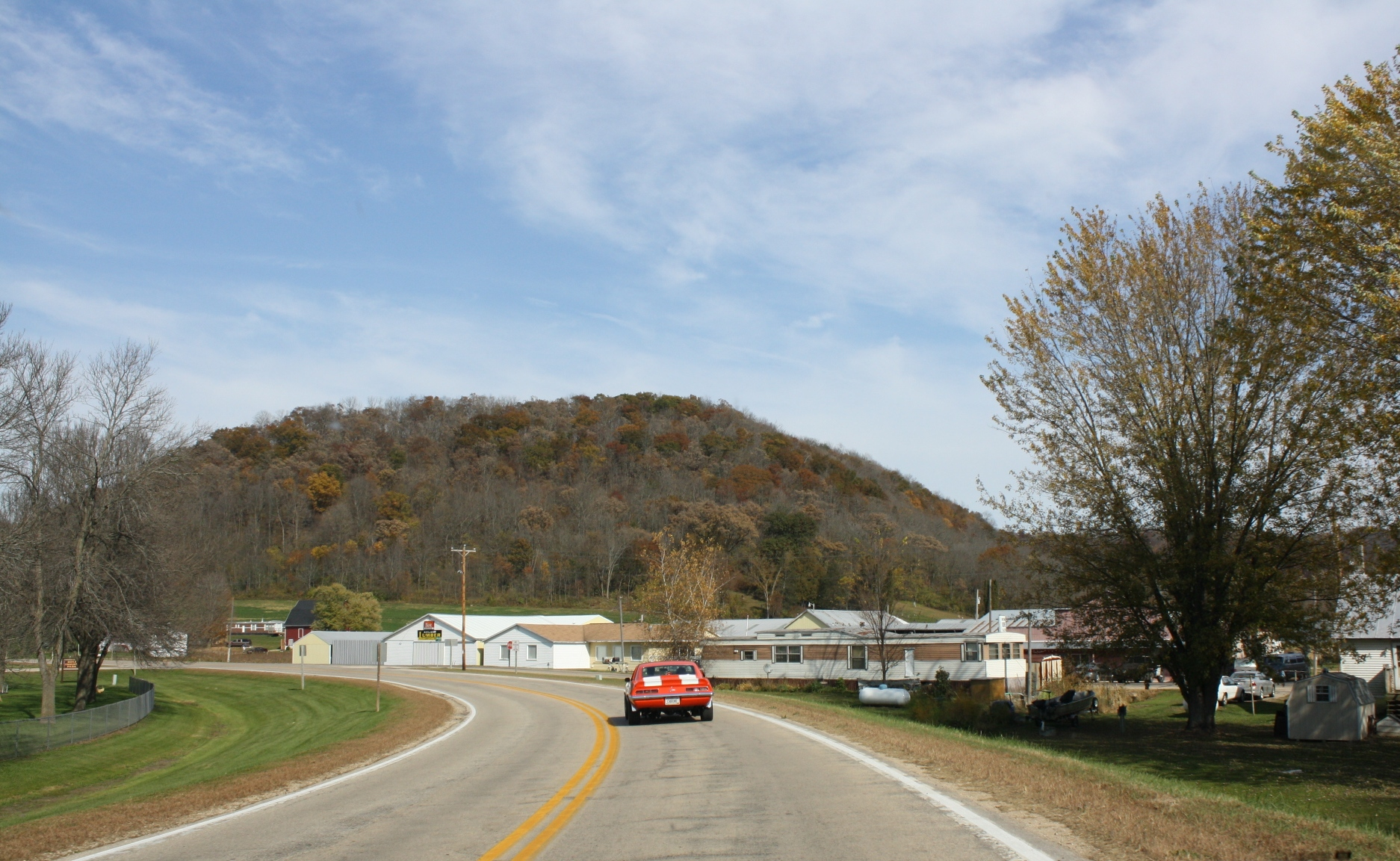
View of Boaz

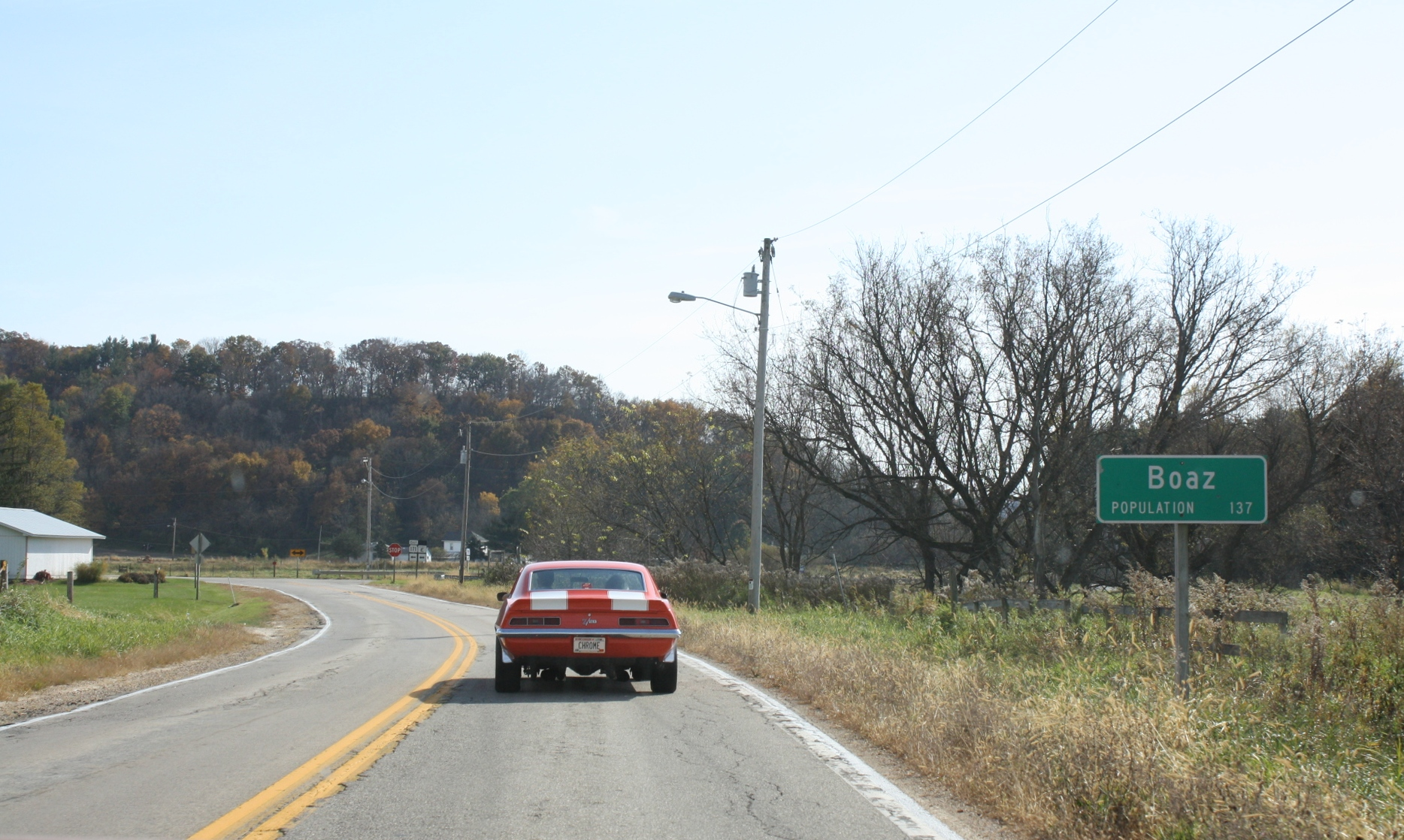
Entrance on WIS 171

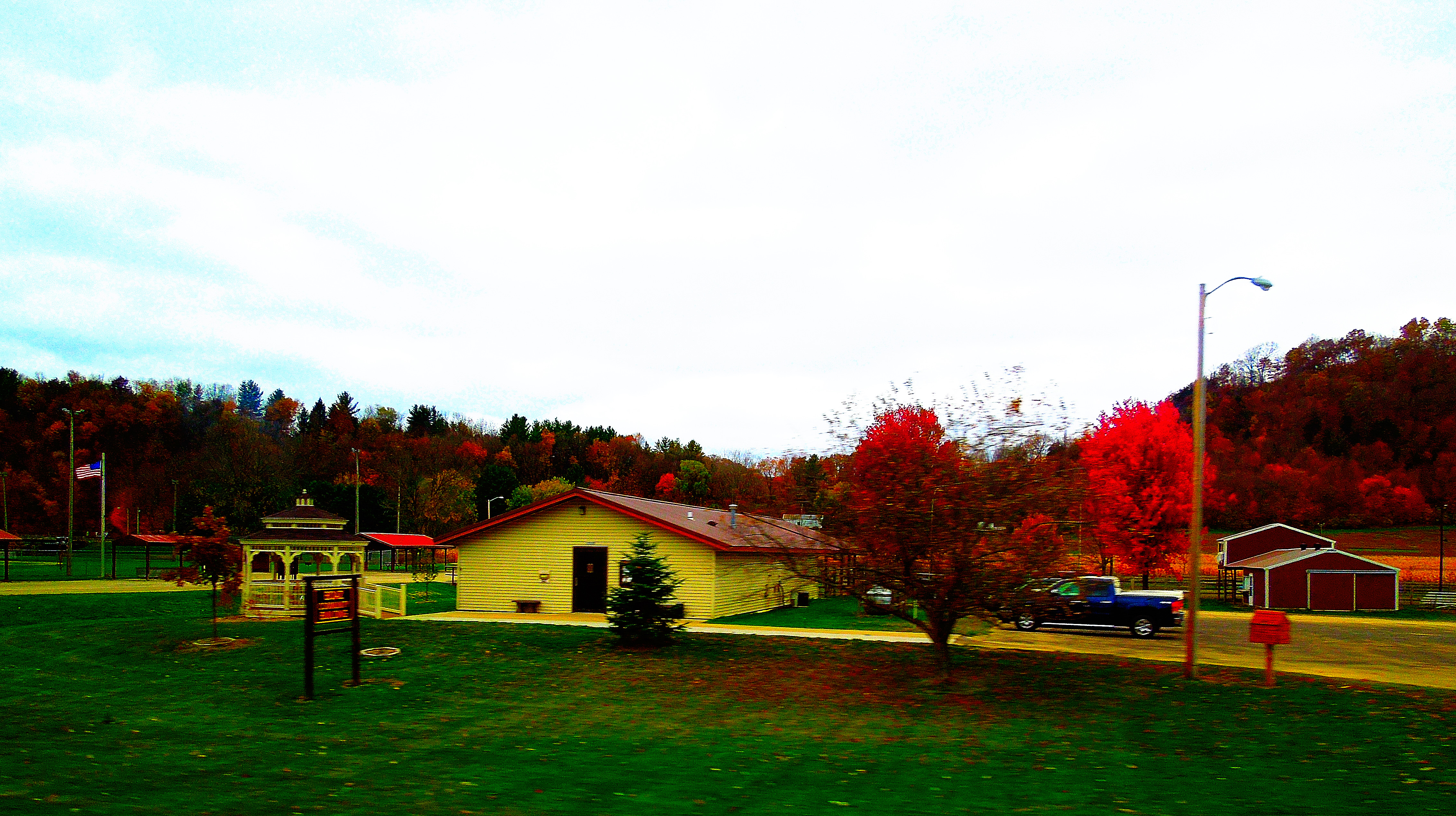
Village hall

== See also ==
- List of villages in Wisconsin
