= Brandon Bridge Formation =

Geologic formation in Wisconsin

- Stratigraphic range: Telychian
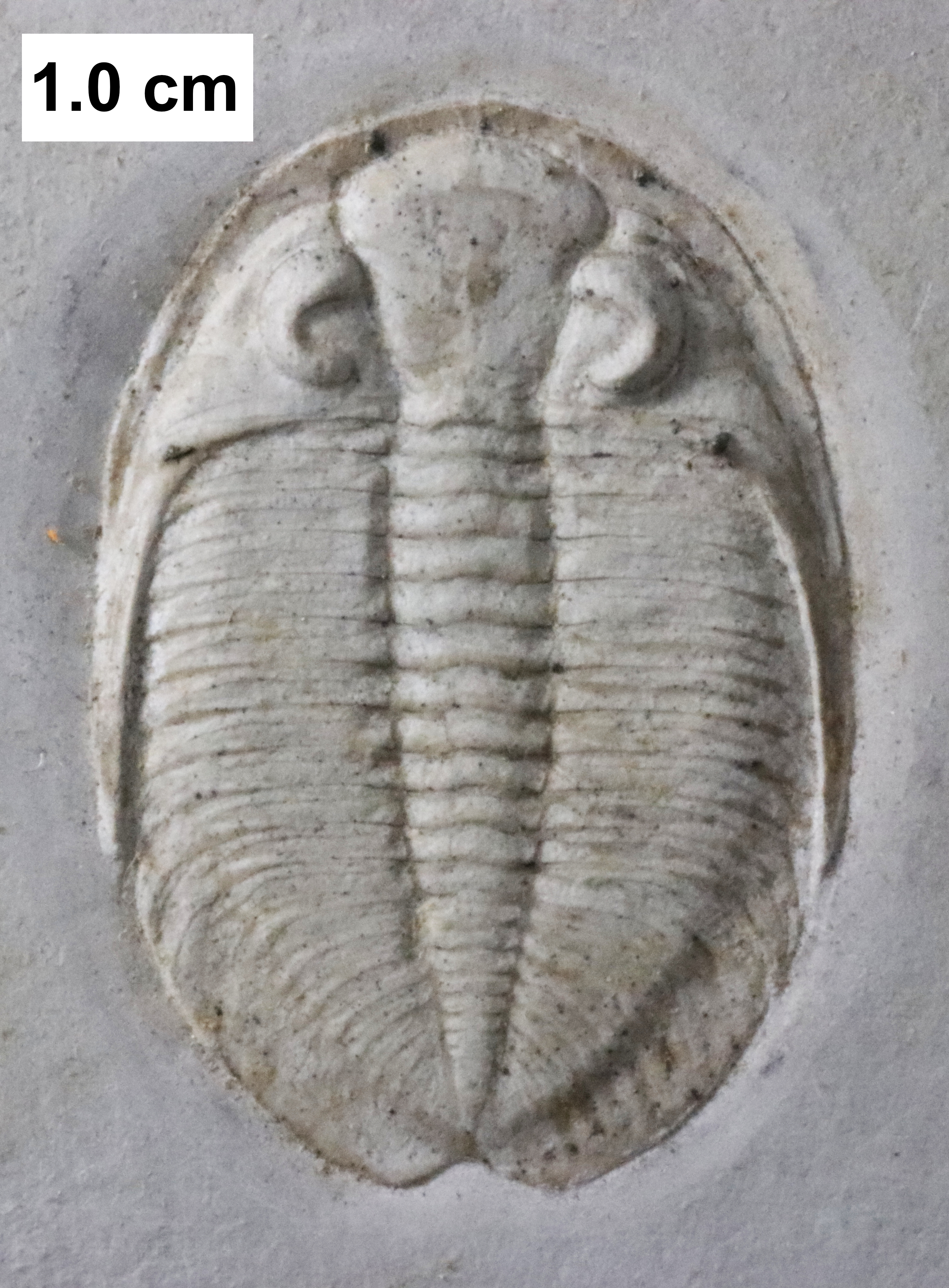
- Waukeshaaspis eatonae, a dalmanitid trilobite found in great abundance within the formation
- Type: Formation

Location
- Region: Wisconsin
- Country: United States

The Brandon Bridge Formation is a geologic formation in Wisconsin. It preserves fossils dating back to the Silurian period, including those of graptolites, conodonts and Parioscorpio.

== See also ==
- List of fossiliferous stratigraphic units in Wisconsin
- Paleontology in Wisconsin
- Waukesha Biota
