= Dolichophonus =

Dolichophonus Temporal range: Silurian (Telychian), 436–428 Ma

Scientific classification
- Kingdom: Animalia
- Phylum: Arthropoda
- Subphylum: Chelicerata
- Class: Arachnida
- Order: Scorpiones
- Family: †Dolichophoniidae; Petrunkevitch, 1953
- Genus: †Dolichophonus; Petrunkevitch, 1949
- Species: †D. loudonensis

Binomial name
- †Dolichophonus loudonensis Laurie, 1899

Synonyms
- Palaeophonus loudonensis Laurie, 1899

Extinct genus of scorpions

Dolichophonus is an extinct genus of scorpions known from the Silurian-age Gutterford Burn Eurypterid bed, in the Pentland Hills in Scotland. It is currently considered the world's oldest known scorpion, as the older Parioscorpio named in 2020 has been found to be an unrelated arthropod.

== Discovery, naming, and history of classification ==
The specimen of Dolichophonus was collected by Mr. Hardie of Bavelaw Castle. When he died, his collection was given to the Edinburgh Museum of Science and Art (now National Museum of Scotland), where it was then studied by Malcolm Laurie. He named seven new species of eurypterids from the collection, along with this scorpion, which he named Palaeophonus loudonensis. It was then transferred to a new genus, Dolichophonus, by Alexander Petrunkevitch in 1949. The genus was then assigned to its own family, Dolichophoniidae, in 1953 by the same author.
