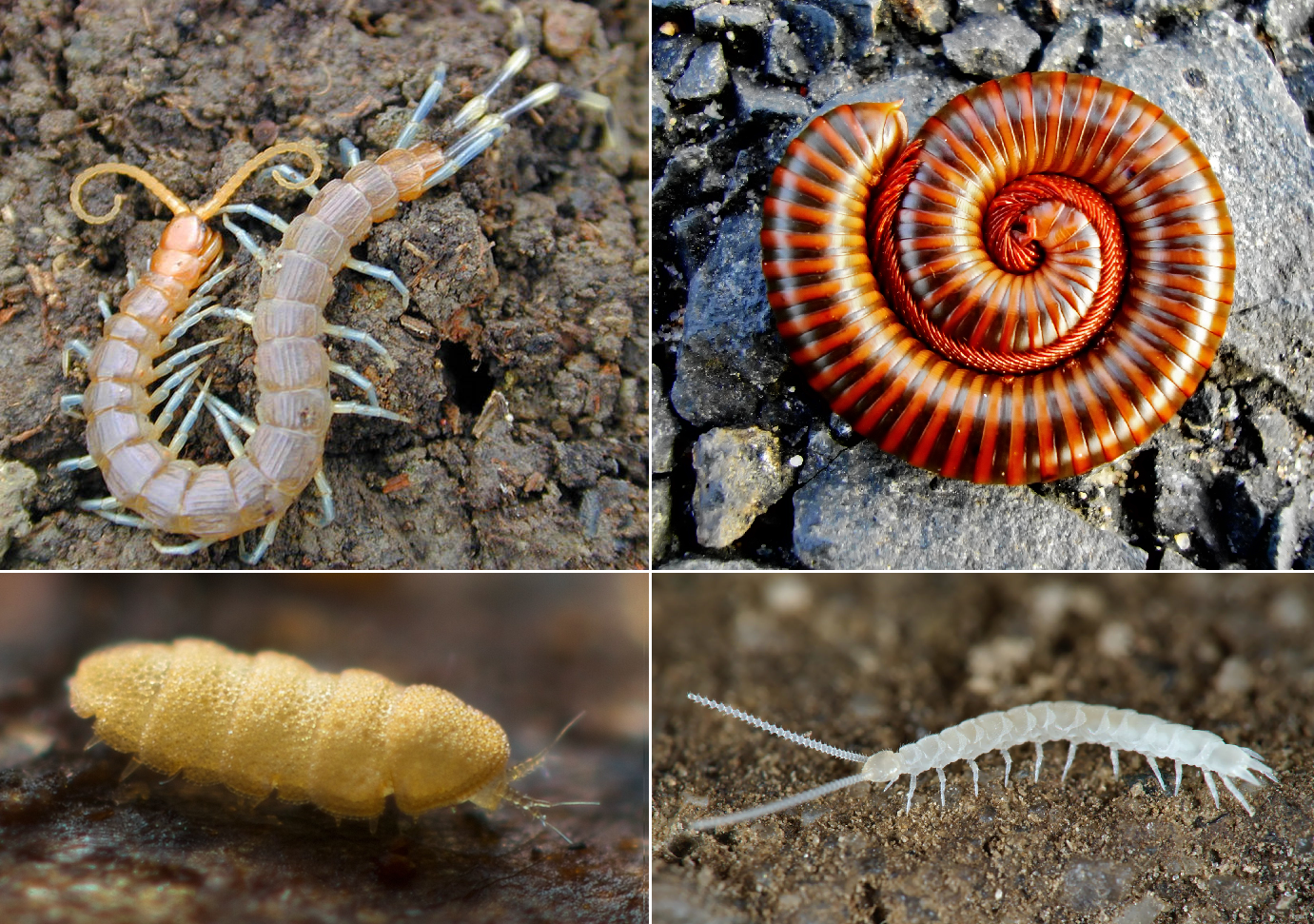
- Representatives of the four extant myriapod classes. Clockwise from top left: Chilopoda, Diplopoda, Symphyla, and Pauropoda

Scientific classification
- Kingdom: Animalia
- Phylum: Arthropoda
- Clade: Mandibulata
- Subphylum: Myriapoda; Latreille, 1802

Classes
- Chilopoda; Diplopoda; Pauropoda; Symphyla

= Myriapoda =

Myriapods Temporal range: Wenlock–Present

Subphylum of arthropods

Myriapods (from Ancient Greek μυρίος (muríos) 'countless' and πούς (poús) 'foot') are the members of subphylum Myriapoda, containing arthropods such as millipedes and centipedes. The group contains about 13,000 species, all of them terrestrial.

Molecular evidence and similar fossils suggests a diversification in the Cambrian Period, and trace fossils indicate that myriapods inhabited the land by the Ordovician Period. The Stem-myriapod mandibulate Waukartus reinforces this. The oldest known body fossil record of myriapods is from the Wenlock Epoch, dated to approximately 427.0 ± 4.5 million years ago. Other early taxa include Kampecaris obanensis and Archidesmus from the Ludlow Epoch. Early taxa like Pneumodesmus preserve one of the earliest known evidence of air-breathing on land. The phylogenetic classification of myriapods is still debated.

The scientific study of myriapods is myriapodology, and those who study myriapods are myriapodologists.

== Anatomy ==
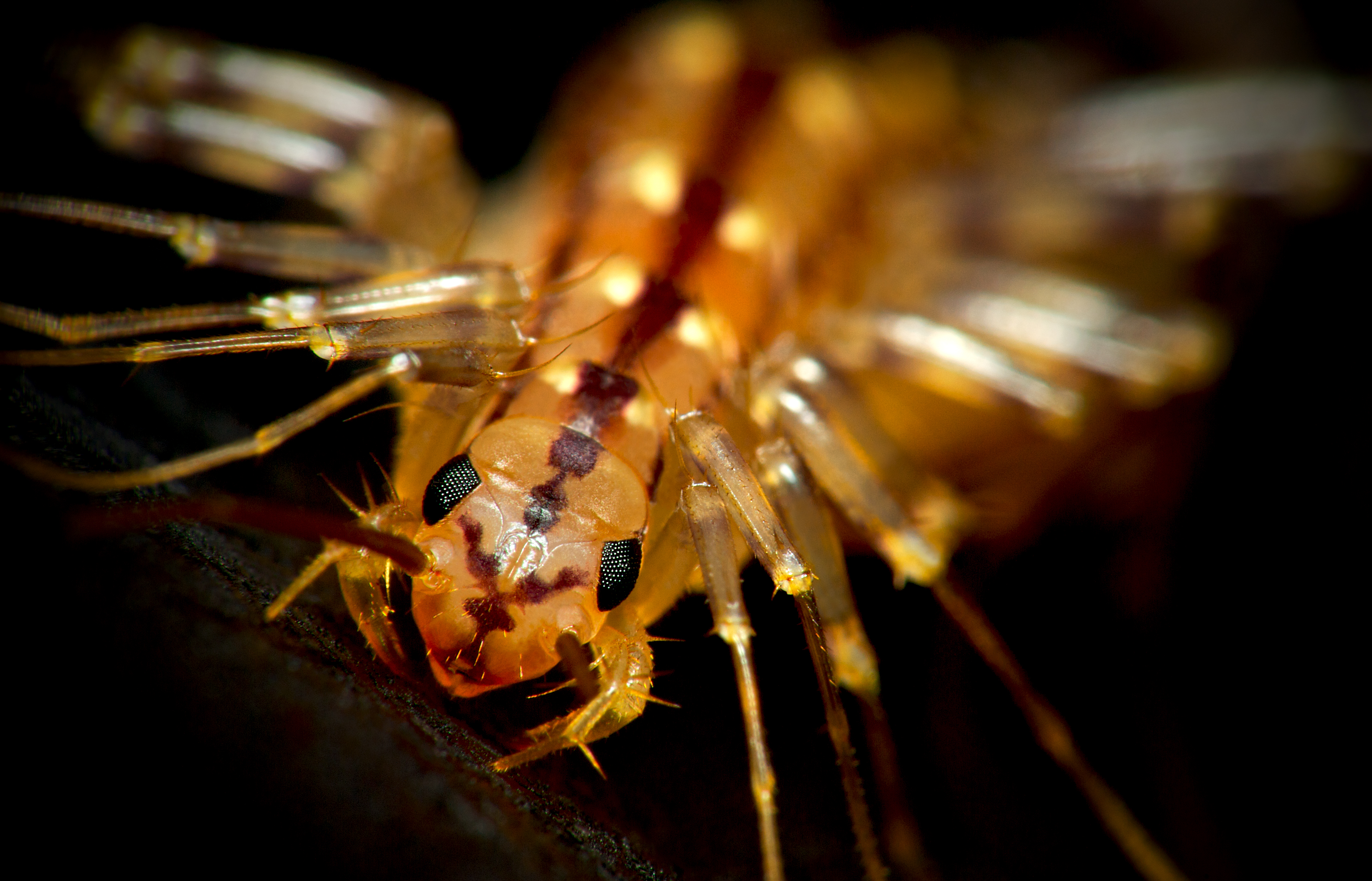
The head of Scutigera coleoptrata, showing antennae, compound eyes and mouthparts

Myriapods have a single pair of antennae and, in most cases, simple eyes. Exceptions are the two classes of symphylans and pauropods, the millipede order Polydesmida and the centipede order Geophilomorpha, which are all eyeless. The house centipedes (Scutigera) on the other hand, have large and well-developed compound eyes. The mouthparts lie on the underside of the head, with an "epistome" and labrum forming the upper lip, and a pair of maxillae forming the lower lip. A pair of mandibles lie inside the mouth. Myriapods breathe through spiracles that connect to a tracheal system similar to that of insects. There is a long tubular heart that extends through much of the body, but usually few, if any, blood vessels.

Malpighian tubules excrete nitrogenous waste into the digestive system, which typically consists of a simple tube. Although the ventral nerve cord has a ganglion in each segment, the brain is relatively poorly developed.

During mating, male myriapods produce a packet of sperm, or spermatophore, which they must transfer to the female externally; this process is often complex and highly developed. The female lays eggs which hatch as much-shortened versions of the adults, with only a few segments and as few as three pairs of legs. With the exception of the two centipede orders Scolopendromorpha and Geophilomorpha, which have epimorphic development (all body segments are formed segments embryonically), the young add additional segments and limbs as they repeatedly moult to reach the adult form. The number of segments can range from 15 to 173.

The process of adding new segments during postembryonic growth is known as anamorphosis, of which there are three types: euanamorphosis, emianamorphosis, and teloanamorphosis. In euanamorphosis, every moult is followed by addition of new segments, even after reaching sexual maturity; in emianamorphosis, new segments are added until a certain stage, and further moults happen without addition of segments; and in teloanamorphosis, where the addition of new segments stops after the adult form is reached, at which point no further moults occur.

== Ecology ==
Myriapods are most abundant in moist forests, where they fulfill an important role in breaking down decaying plant material, although a few live in grasslands, semi-arid habitats or even deserts. A very small percentage of species are littoral (found along the sea shore). The majority are detritivorous, with the exception of centipedes, which are chiefly nocturnal predators.

A few species of centipedes and millipedes are able to produce light and are therefore bioluminescent. Pauropodans and symphylans are small, sometimes microscopic animals that resemble centipedes superficially and live in soils. Millipedes differ from the other groups in having their body segments fused into pairs, giving the appearance that each segment bears two pairs of legs, while the other three groups have a single pair of legs on each body segment.

Although not generally considered dangerous to humans, many millipedes produce noxious secretions (often containing benzoquinones) which in rare cases can cause temporary blistering and discolouration of the skin. Large centipedes can bite humans, and although the bite may cause intense pain and discomfort, fatalities are extremely rare.

== Classification ==
There has been much debate as to which arthropod group is most closely related to the Myriapoda. Under the Mandibulata hypothesis, Myriapoda is the sister taxon to Pancrustacea, a group comprising the Crustacea and Hexapoda (insects and their close relatives). Under the Atelocerata hypothesis, Hexapoda is the closest, whereas under the Paradoxopoda hypothesis, Chelicerata is the closest. This last hypothesis, although supported by few, if any, morphological characters, is supported by a number of molecular studies. A 2020 study found numerous characters of the eye and preoral region suggesting that the closest relatives to crown myriapods are the extinct Euthycarcinoids. In 2026, the newly described Waukartus, from the Llandoverian of Wisconsin, United States, was recovered as a stem-myriapod, already showcasing walking uniramous limbs.

There are four classes of extant myriapods, Chilopoda (centipedes), Diplopoda, Pauropoda and Symphyla, containing a total of around 12,000 species. While each of these groups of myriapods is believed to be monophyletic, relationships among them are less certain.

=== Centipedes ===
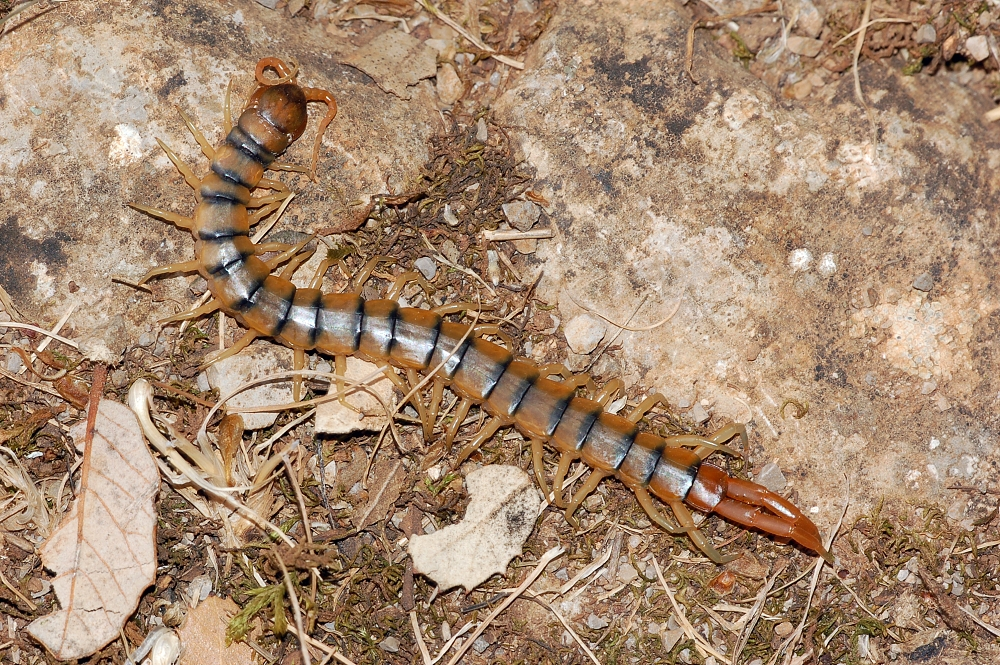
Scolopendra cingulata, a centipede

Centipedes make up the class Chilopoda. They are fast, predatory and venomous, hunting mostly at night. During the day, they generally lie under rocks, during the night they chase larvae, earthworms and even lizards and small rodents. There are around 3,300 species, ranging from the diminutive Nannarrup hoffmani (less than 12 mm or 1/2 in in length) to the giant Scolopendra gigantea, which may exceed 30 centimetres (12 in).

=== Millipedes ===
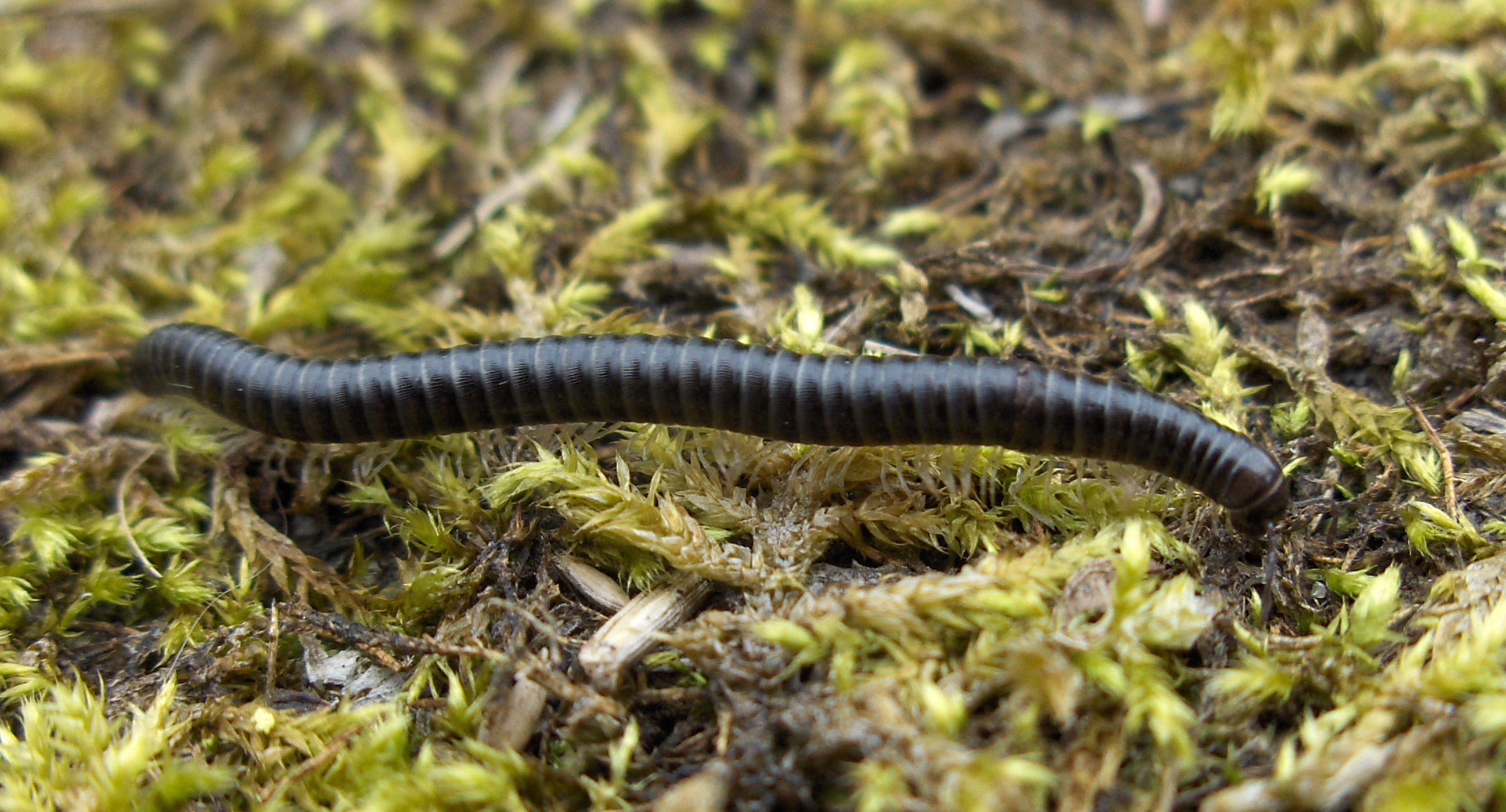
Tachypodoiulus niger, a millipede

Millipedes form the class Diplopoda. Most millipedes are slower than centipedes, and feed on leaf litter and detritus. Except for the first segment called collum, which don't have any appendages, and the next three segments with a single pair of legs each, they are distinguished by the fusion of each pair of body segments into a single unit, giving the appearance of having two pairs of legs per segment. It is also common for the sternites, pleurites and tergites to fuse into rigid armour rings. The males produce aflagellate sperm cells, unlike the rest of the myriapods which produce flagellated sperm. Around 12,000 species have been described, which may represent less than a tenth of the true global millipede diversity. Although the name "millipede" is a compound word formed from the Latin roots millia ("thousand") and pes (gen. pedis) ("foot"), millipedes typically have between 36 and 400 legs. In 2021, however, was described Eumillipes persephone, the first species known to have 1,000 or more legs, possessing 1,306 of them. Pill millipedes are much shorter, and are capable of rolling up into a ball, like pillbugs.

=== Symphyla ===
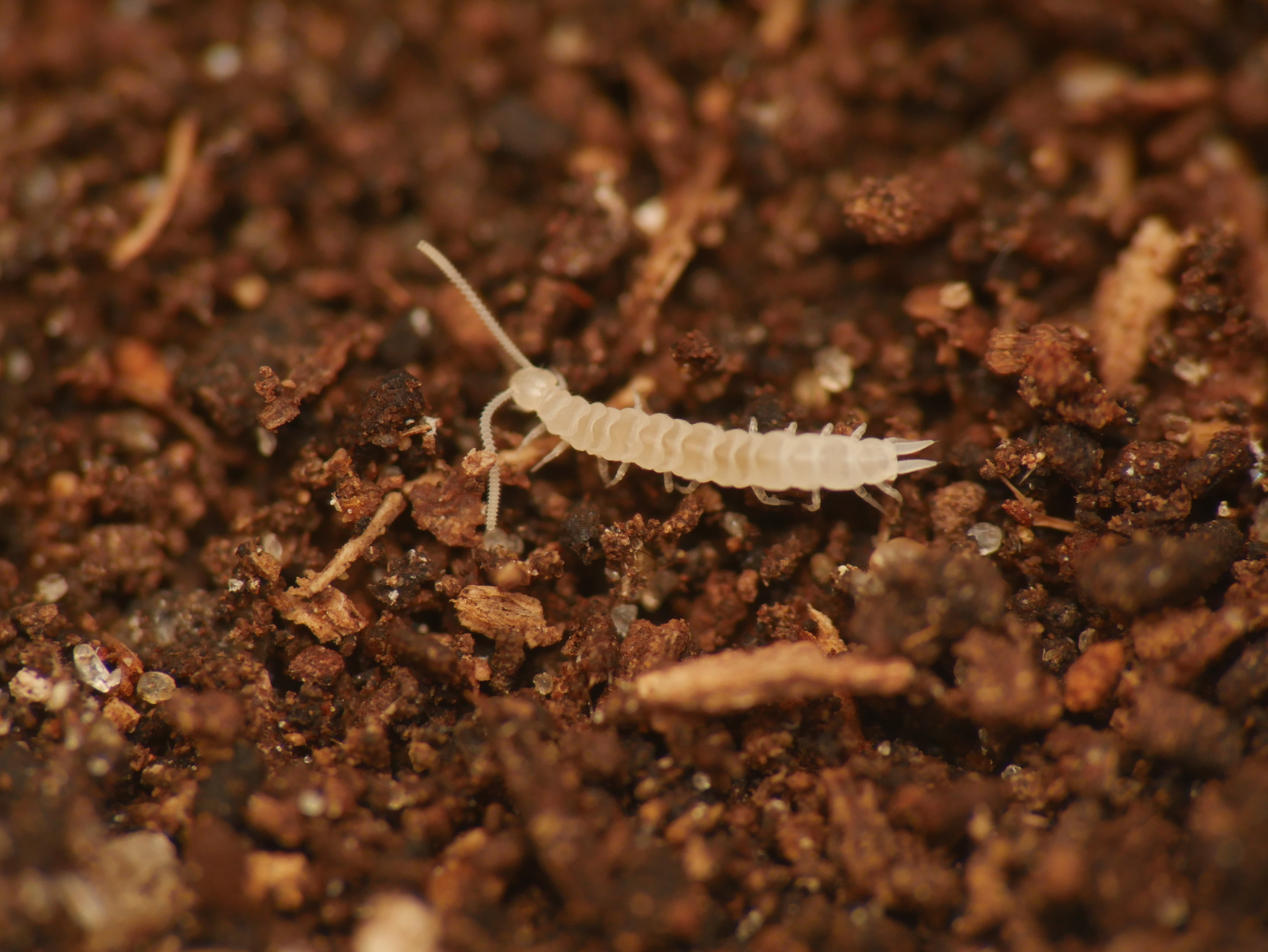
A species of Scutigerella, a genus of symphylan

Symphylans, or garden centipedes, are closely related to centipedes and millipedes. They are 3 to 6 cm long, and have 6 to 12 pairs of legs, depending on their life stage. Their eggs, which are white and spherical and covered with small hexagonal ridges, are laid in batches of 4 to 25 at a time, and usually take up to 40 days to hatch. There are about 200 species worldwide.

=== Pauropoda ===
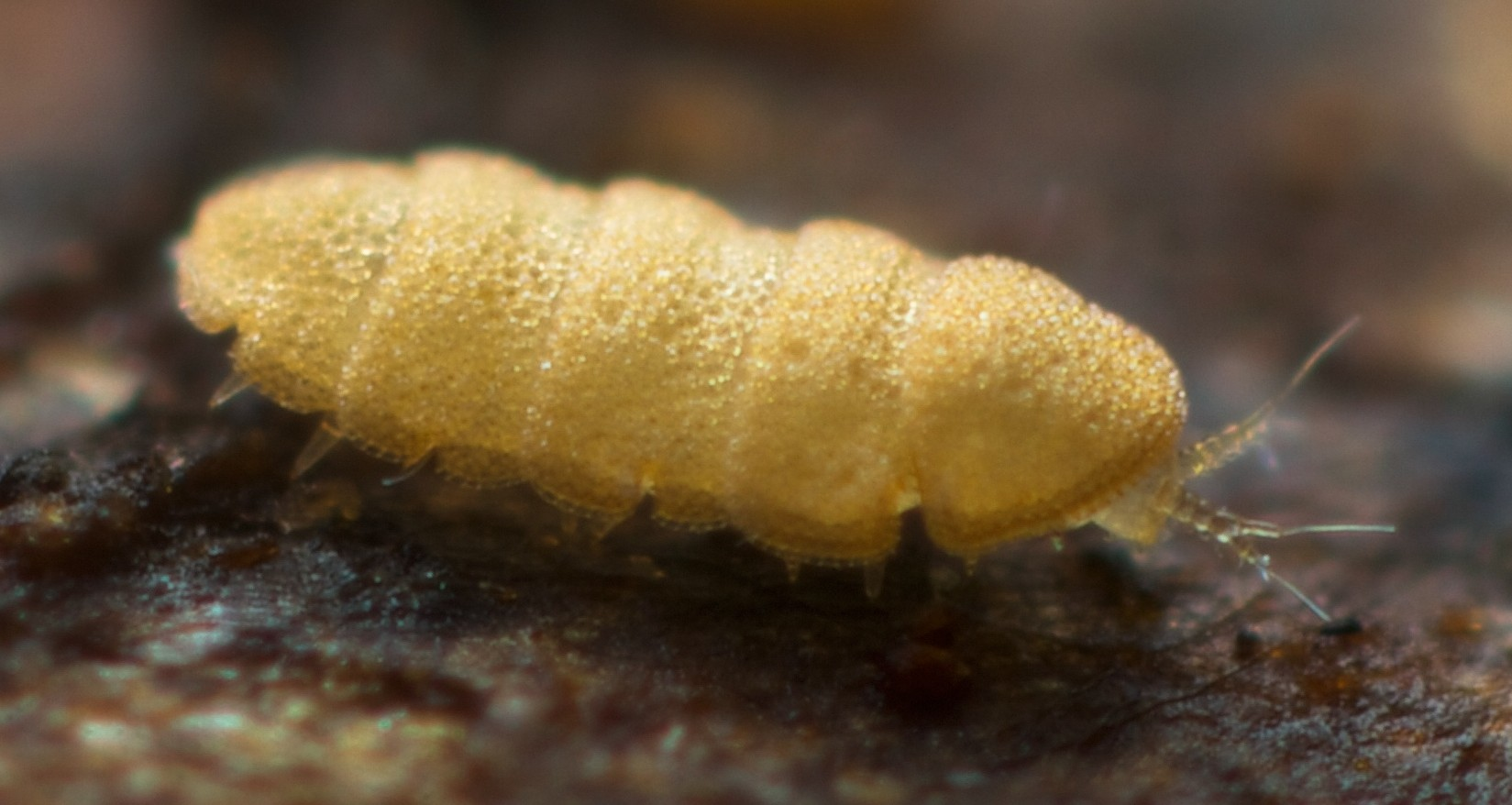
A species of Samarangopus, a genus of pauropod

Pauropoda is another small group of small myriapods. They are typically 0.5–2.0 mm long and live in the soil on all continents except Antarctica. Over 700 species have been described. They are believed to be the sister group to millipedes, and have the dorsal tergites fused across pairs of segments, similar to the more complete fusion of segments seen in millipedes.

=== Arthropleuridea ===
Arthropleura, an arthropleuridean

Arthropleurideans were ancient myriapods that are now extinct, known from the late Silurian to the Permian. The most famous members are from the genus Arthropleura, which was a giant, probably herbivorous, animal that could be up to 2.63 metres (8 ft 8 in) long, but the group also includes species less than 1 cm (0.39 in). Arthropleuridea was historically considered a distinct class of myriapods, but since 2000 scientific consensus has viewed the group as a subset of millipedes, although the relationship of arthropleurideans to other millipedes and to each other is debated.

=== Myriapod relationships ===
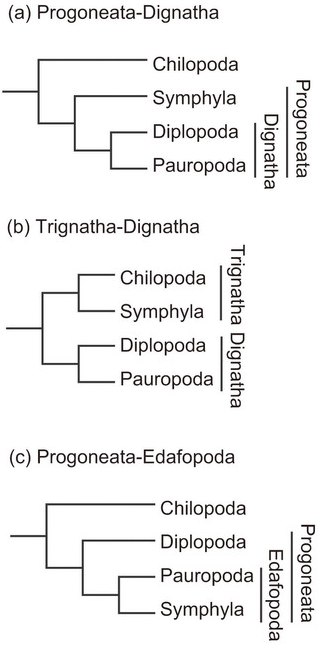
Some of the various hypotheses of myriapod phylogeny. Morphological studies (trees a and b) support a sister grouping of Diplopoda and Pauropoda, while studies of DNA or amino acid similarities suggest a variety of different relationships, including the relationship of Pauropoda and Symphyla in tree c

A variety of groupings (clades) of the myriapod classes have been proposed, some of which are mutually exclusive, and all of which represent hypotheses of evolutionary relationships. Traditional relationships supported by morphological similarities (anatomical or developmental similarities) are challenged by newer relationships supported by molecular evidence (including DNA sequence and amino acid similarities).

- Dignatha (also called Collifera) is a clade consisting of millipedes and pauropods, and is supported by morphological similarities including the presence of a gnathochilarium (a modified jaw and plate apparatus) and a collum, a legless segment behind the head.
- Trignatha (also called Atelopoda) is a grouping of centipedes and symphylans, united by similarities of mouthparts.
- Edafopoda is a grouping of symphylans and pauropodans that is supported by shared genetic sequences, yet conflicts with Dignatha and Trignatha.
- Pectinopoda consist of millipedes and centipedes, a classification that also supports Edafopoda.
- Progoneata is a group encompassing millipedes, pauropods and symphylans while excluding centipedes. Shared features include reproductive openings (gonopores) behind the second body segment, and sensory hairs (trichobothria) with a bulb-like swelling. It is compatible with either Dignatha or Edafopoda.

== See also ==
- Euthycarcinoidea, a group of enigmatic arthropods that may be ancestral to myriapods
- Colonization of land, major evolutionary stages leading to terrestrial organisms
- Metamerism, the condition of multiple linearly repeated body segments
