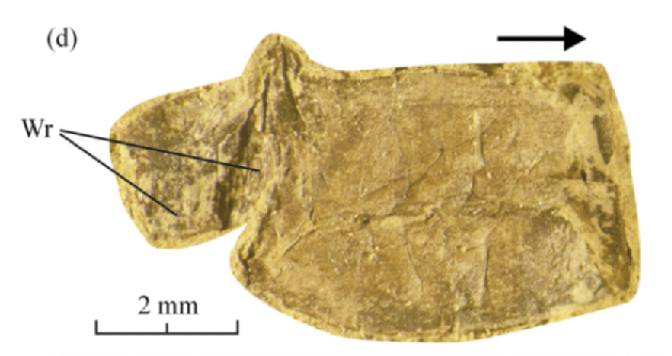
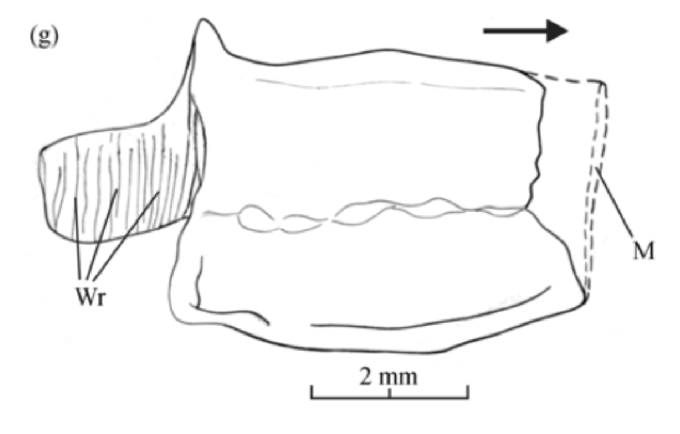
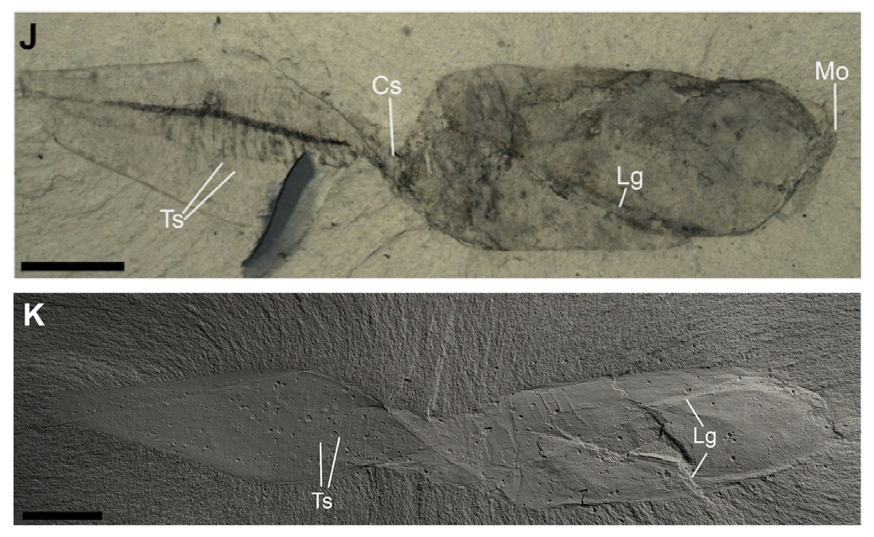
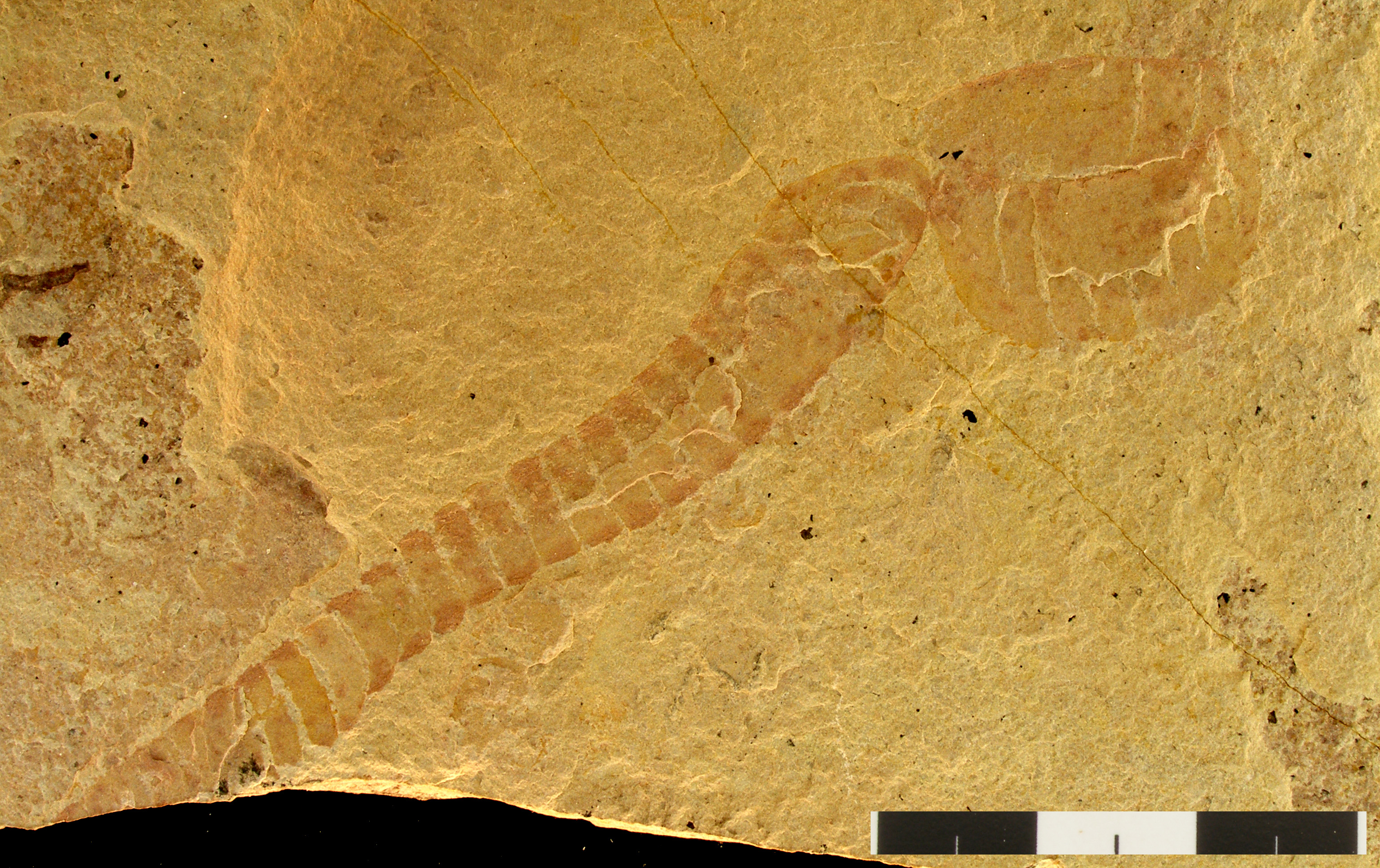
- "Form A" fossil "Form A" diagram Banffia constricta Skeemella clavula Fossils and diagrams of banffozoans

Scientific classification
- Kingdom: Animalia
- Phylum: Chordata
- Clade?: †Vetulicolia
- Class: †Banffozoa; Caron 2006

Type species
- †Banffia constricta Walcott, 1911

Orders
- †Banffiata; †Banffiidae; incertae sedis; †"Form A"; ? †Skeemella

Synonyms
- †Heteromorphida Shu 2005 (see text)

= Banffozoa =

Banffozoa Temporal range: about 518–501 Ma Cambrian Stage 3—Drumian

Extinct Cambrian group of marine animals

Banffozoa (also called Heteromorphida) is an extinct class of bilaterians. Most workers place it in the Vetulicolia, but the protostome-like features of some members have motivated ongoing debate. Banffozoa consists of the order Banffiata (which has only one family, Banffiidae) as well as a dwarf "Form A" that has not been formally described or named. Skeemella has been placed incertae sedis in this class, but has more recently been placed with the Banffiidae (if it is a banffozoan or vetulicolian at all). Banffozoa may be paraphyletic even if Vetulicolia is monophyletic.

== Description ==
Banffozoans have a bipartite body with a smooth anterior part that generally lacks evidence of segmentation and may or may not have a lateral groove. The posterior section features far more segments than the Vetulicolida, and (except in Skeemella) these segments are each much narrower as well. Lateral pouches such as those found in the Vetulicolida have not been seen, although some questions remain regarding their possible presence in Skeemella.

The entire body is twisted dextrally (from an anterior view). Gut diverticula may be present. The anus is terminal, despite initial reports to the contrary in Heteromorphus.

The length of banffozoans ranges from 1 cm for "Form A" to more than 14 cm for Skeemella.

=== Form A ===
In addition to its much smaller size (even smaller than Beidazoon), the specimen known as "Form A" differs from other banffozoans by having a highly sclerotized shell and a posterior section that emerges only from the dorsal portion of the anterior section, instead of from both the dorsal and ventral portions.

== Taxonomy ==
Banffozoans have been argued to be more closely related to protostomes than to deuterostomes, even if the Vetulicolida are deuterostomes. Banffia shows no sign of gill openings, and potential gill openings in Heteromorphus or Skeemella are unclear. However, a burrowing lifestyle could explain the lack of visible openings.

The possible presence of gut diverticula in Banffia constricta would suggest a protostome affinity, but the same researcher proposed that these features could represent a circulatory system instead.

Other arguments center around possible arthropod affinity for Skeemella, although if Skeemella is not a banffozoan, they would no longer apply. No mouth has been preserved in any Skeemella specimens, preventing observations of its morphology. The extremely long posterior section has been considered arthropod-like, especially the bifid (forked) terminal segment. However, the length of the posterior section would also be unusually long for an arthropod thorax, and reconstruction as an arthropod would require unlikely breakage in the supposed valve. The forked terminal segment remains more reminiscent of arthropods than vetulicolians.

Despite these debates, most workers continue to consider Banffozoa a class within Vetulicolia, or otherwise closely associated with the Vetulicolida.

An intriguing possibility for protostome affinities is suggested by the Centroneuralia hypothesis, which features a paraphyletic Deuterostomia with chordates as the sister-group to protostomes. If proven true, pharyngeal slits would no longer require a deuterostome placement and vetulicolians could prove to be stem protostomes that lost the post-anal tail. In such a scenario, Banffozoa could be a more derived stem protostome group than Vetulicolida.

=== Cladograms ===
A 2024 study has found the Banffozoa to form the earliest part of the paraphyletic stem-chordate evolutionary grade, as shown in this simplified cladogram:

- Chordata (total group)
  - Banffia†
  - Heteromorphus†
  - - Skeemella†
    - - Nesonektris†
      - - Vetulicolidae†
        - - Didazoon†
          - Pomatrum†
          - Yuyuanozoon†
          - - Yunnanozoon†
            - - Cathaymyrus†
              - Pikaia†
              - Chordata
                (crown group)

An earlier study in 2014 placed vetulicolians as the sister-group of tunicates, but was unable to resolve any relationships among vetulicolians as a group:

- Vetulicolia†
  - Vetulicola†
  - Beidazoon†
  - Ooedigera†
  - Pomatrum† / Xidazoon†
  - Didazoon†
  - Yuyuanozoon†
  - Banffia†
  - Heteromorphus†
  - Nesonektris†
- Tunicata

=== Preference for Banffozoa over Heteromorphida ===
Banffozoa was published in a journal issue dated June 2005, but with a formal in-print date of 2006. Heteromorphida was published with a date of October 2005. When expanding Banffozoa to encompass Chinese genera such as Heteromorphus, Aldridge et al. added a post-proof note suggesting that Heteromorphida, of which they had been unaware, appeared to take precedence over Banffozoa based on Banffozoa's formal date of 2006. However, the principle of priority does not govern taxonomic ranks above the family level.

While at least one later source has given precedence to Heteromorphida, several sources have preferred Banffozoa. At least one such source mentions Heteromorphida as a synonym, but most do not.
