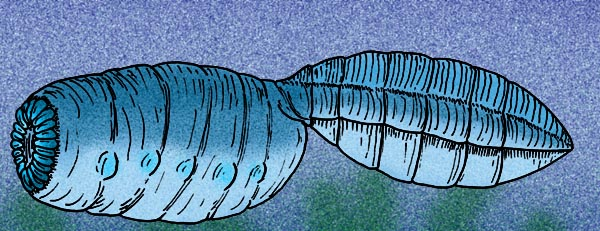
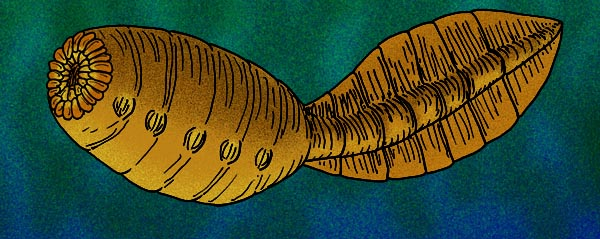
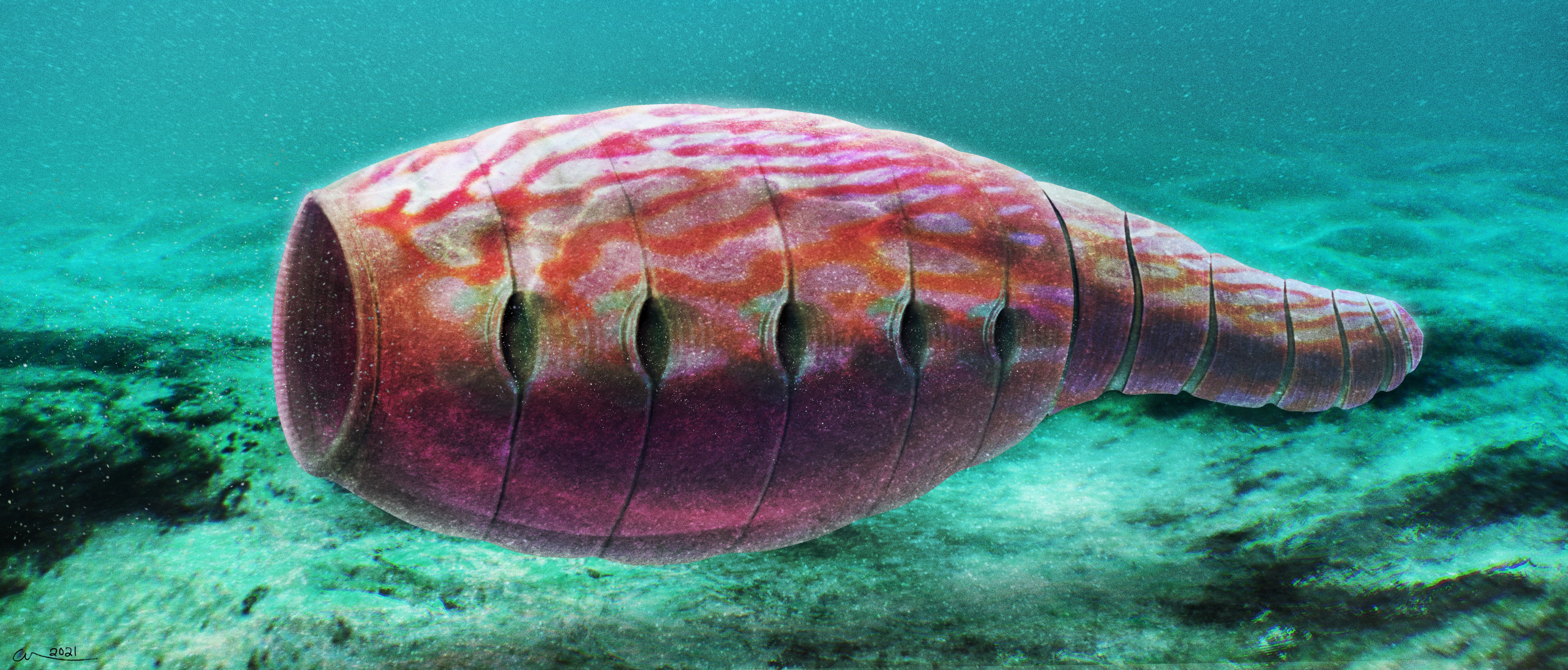
- Didazoon haoae Pomatrum ventralis Yuyuanozoon magnificissimi Artists' reconstructions of Didazoonids

Scientific classification
- Kingdom: Animalia
- Phylum: Chordata
- Clade?: †Vetulicolia
- Class: †Vetulicolida
- Order: †Vetulicolata
- Family: †Didazoonidae; Shu and Han in Shu et al. 2001

Type genus
- †Didazoon Shu and Han in Shu et al. 2001

Genera
- †Didazoon Shu and Han in Shu et al. 2001; †Pomatrum Luo and Hu, in Luo et al. 1999; †Yuyuanozoon Chen, Feng and Zhu in Chen et al. 2003; ? †Nesonektris García-Bellido et al. 2014

= Didazoonidae =

Didazoonidae Temporal range: Cambrian Stage 3

Extinct Cambrian family of vetulicolid animals

Didazoonidae is a vetulicolian family within the order Vetulicolata. It is characterized by a relatively thin-walled, non-biomineralized body and a large, round anterior opening surrounded by an oral disc. It may be paraphyletic, even if the phylum Vetulicolia is monophyletic.

== Description ==
Didazoonids have an ovoid to subquadrate anterior section divided into six subdivisions marked by five circumventing lines perpendicular to the body axis. Cowl-shaped lateral pouches appear along each side of the anterior section, coincident with the five dividing lines. The anterior opening is large, round, and surrounded by a circumventing oral disc. The posterior section has seven segments, which in some species each carry up to six annulations.

== Taxonomy ==
Didazoonidae was erected to group Didazoon. Xidazoon. and Pomatrum, although Xidazoon has since been shown to be a junior synonym of Pomatrum. Yuyuanozoon was moved to the Didazoonidae after additional specimens illuminated more details of the anterior opening and posterior segment annulations.

Nesonektris has also been assigned to Didazoonidae by some workers, but this has not been widely accepted.

A 2024 study has found the Didazoonidae (without Nesonektris) to be a paraphyletic grade of the vetulicolians closest to crownward chordates as shown in this simplified cladogram:

- Chordata (total group)
  - Banffia†
  - Heteromorphus†
  - - Skeemella†
    - - Nesonektris†
      - - Vetulicolidae†
        - - Didazoon†
          - Pomatrum†
          - Yuyuanozoon†
          - - Yunnanozoon†
            - - Cathaymyrus†
              - Pikaia†
              - Chordata
                (crown group)

An earlier study in 2014 placed vetulicolians as the sister-group to tunicates, but was unable to resolve any relationships among vetulicolians as a group:

- Vetulicolia†
  - Vetulicola†
  - Beidazoon†
  - Ooedigera†
  - Pomatrum† / Xidazoon†
  - Didazoon†
  - Yuyuanozoon†
  - Banffia†
  - Heteromorphus†
  - Nesonektris†
- Tunicata
