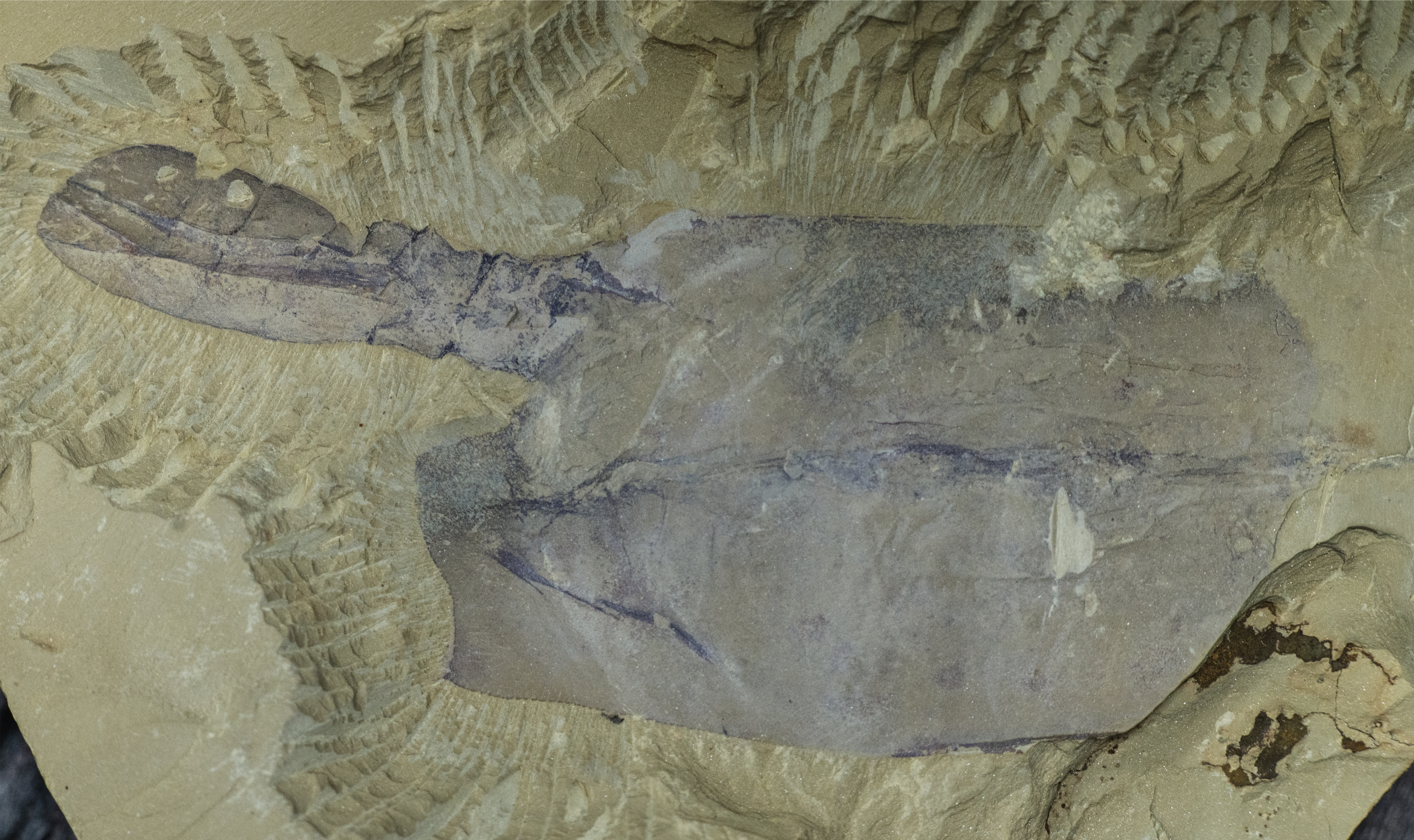
- Fossil of V. cuneata

Scientific classification
- Kingdom: Animalia
- Phylum: Chordata
- Clade?: †Vetulicolia
- Class: †Vetulicolida
- Order: †Vetulicolata
- Family: †Vetulicolidae
- Genus: †Vetulicola
- Species: †V. cuneata

Binomial name
- †Vetulicola cuneata Hou, 1987

= Vetulicola cuneata =

Vetulicola cuneata Temporal range: Cambrian Stage 3

Extinct species of animal

Vetulicola cuneata ("wedged-shaped ancient dweller") is a species of extinct marine animal from the Early Cambrian Chengjiang biota of China. It was described by Hou Xian-guang in 1987 from the Lower Cambrian Chiungchussu Formation, and became the first animal (type species) under an eponymous phylum Vetulicolia.

Remarked as "enigmatic creatures" and originally classified as an arthropod, it is recognised as a deuterostome along with other related species, for which a separate class (Vetulicolida), order (Vetulicolata), family (Vetulicolidae) and ultimately a new clade (Vetulicolia) were created based on its name.

== Discovery and taxonomy ==
In 1984, Hou Xian-guang of the Nanjing Institute of Geology and Palaeontology, Chinese Academy of Sciences, explored the Chiungchussu Formation in Chengjiang, China. At the Maotianshan Hill, from which the sediments called Maotianshan Shales were already established to be of Cambrian in origin, he found a variety of animal fossils. The first species he formally reported was that of an arthropod Naraoia, described as an "unusual trilobite". The rich fossils were eventually established as the Chengjiang biota.

Among Hou's earliest collections were a group of bivalved arthropods, which he described in the journal Acta Palaeontologica Sinica in 1987. One group which he categorised "larger bivalved arthropods" included five distinct species, one of which he named Vetulicola cuneata, for its obvious ancient nature (Latin vetuli means "old" and cola, "inhabitant") and wedge-shaped beak-like body (cuneata for wedge-shaped). Although Hou classified V. cuneata as a species of the phylum Arthopoda for its prominent body covering called carapace, a common feature among arthropods, he immediately noticed some issues. The Vetulicola body was divided into two separate parts, dorsal and ventral carapace, by clear longitudinal groove, which he realised was an odd feature for an arthropod that should normally lack such demarcating groove. He also mistakenly identified a short tail-like projection at the posterior region as consisting of two segments and attached to the ventral side of the body.

In 1991, with the help of Jan Bergström (of the Swedish Museum of Natural History), Hou re-analysed the species from more than 100 specimens and resolved that the posterior projection typically consists of seven segments and arose (after turning upside-down the specimens) from the dorsal surface of the body. Palaeontologists continued to consider the species as an arthropod although they understood the anomaly and missing features of Arthropoda.

In 1997, Hou's colleagues Jun-yuan Chen and Guiqing Zhou extensively reviewed and re-eaxmined the Chengjian fossils. Among the new species they identified was Banffia confusa. The genus Banffia was created by American palaeontologist Charles Doolittle Walcott in 1911 for a new species B. constricta from the Burgess Shale of British Columbia, Canada. B. constricta was considered as member of the phylum Annelida for its apparent segmented worm-like body. When Chen and Zhou compared B. confusa with V. cuneata, they realised the close relationship between the two specimens, having shared most defining features, so that they created a new class Vetulicolida for the two genera under Arthropoda.

In 1999, Huilin Luo and his colleagues at the Yunnan Institute of Geological Sciences described a new species Pomatrum ventralis as a closely related arthropod to V. cuneata. The same year, Degan Shu and his research team at the Northwest University in Xi'an, along with Simon Conway Morris at the University of Cambridge, described a new species Xidazoon stephanus which was recognised as related to primitive jawless fish. In 2001, Shu and Conway Morris realised the need to reassess all the Chengjian species related to V. cuneata. With a report of a new species Didazoon haoae, they revised the entire classification adopting the class Vetulicolida and introduced the phylum Vetulicolia for all species of Vetulicola, Banffia, Pomatrum, Xidazoon and Didazoon. The new phylum was classified as member of the "primitive deuterostomes," a group that consists of animals ancestral to chordates.

== Description ==
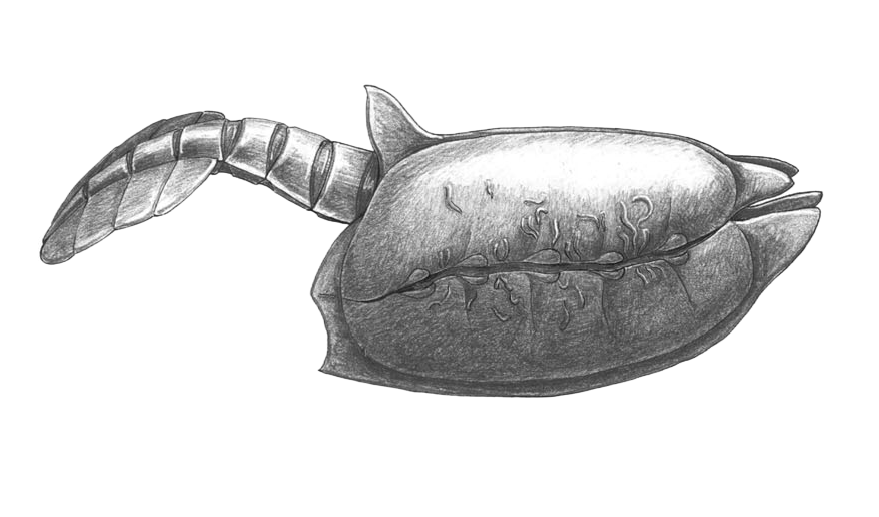
Reconstruction of a V. cuneata with Vermilituus gregarius

Vetulicola cuneata has a body composed of two distinct parts of approximately equal length. The anterior part is rectangular in shape, and enclosed by a carapace-like structure of cuticular plates fused together, with a large, V-shaped mouth at the front end: there is a keel-like extension of the body wall on the top and belly. It was earlier described as having four plates, but closer examination showed that the apparent lateral groove that appeared to create two plates was not cutting through the entire body. The lateral plates are in fact joined at the posterior region, thus, only two plates are present. The tail-like posterior section is slender, strongly cuticularised and placed dorsally. It is made up of seven segments. Paired openings connecting the pharynx to the outside run down the sides. These features are interpreted as possible primitive gill slits. The entire body could be up to 7 cm long.

== Lifestyle ==
It is assumed that V. cuneata spent most or all of its time swimming in the water column. Sediment found within the gut suggest that it was a deposit-feeder, possibly swimming to and from favorable feeding sites. Some specimens that had individuals of the putative entoproct, Cotyledion tyloides attached to the terminal tail segment indicate that V. cuneata lay buried in the sediment, with only its terminal segment exposed, but, nothing about its anatomy, or the taphonomy of its fossils, suggest that it was a burrower. Rather, it was more likely that larval C. tyloides would occasionally settle on the terminal segment, then take advantage of serendipity to feed whenever their host discharged nutrient-rich fecal matter.

V. cuneata and V. rectangulata have symbiotic association with a worm called Vermilituus gregarius. The worms are attached on the internal surface of the plates as a kind of endosymbionts. The nature of the symbiosis is not clear, as it could be either useful (commensal) or harmful (parasitic).
