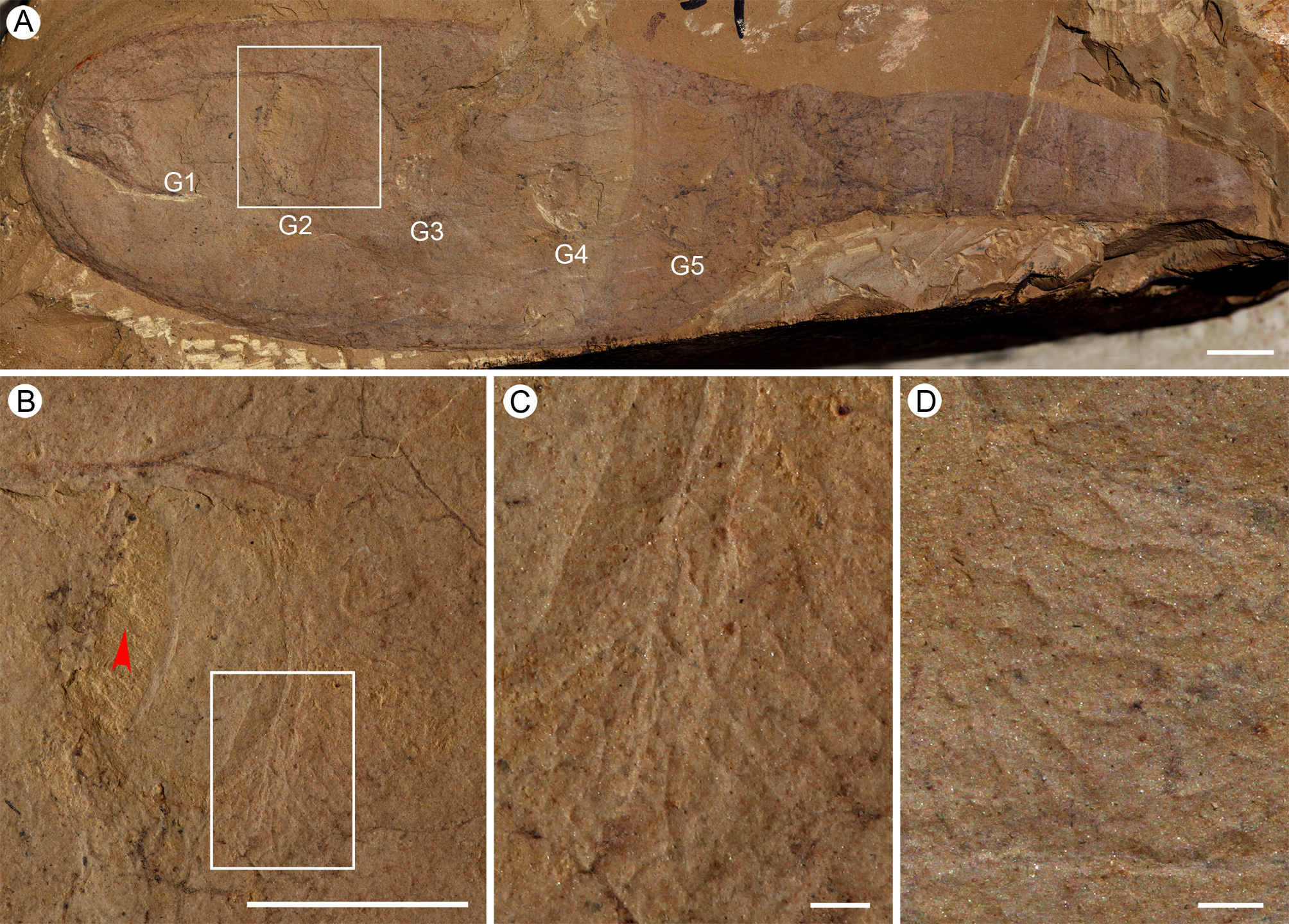
- Holotype
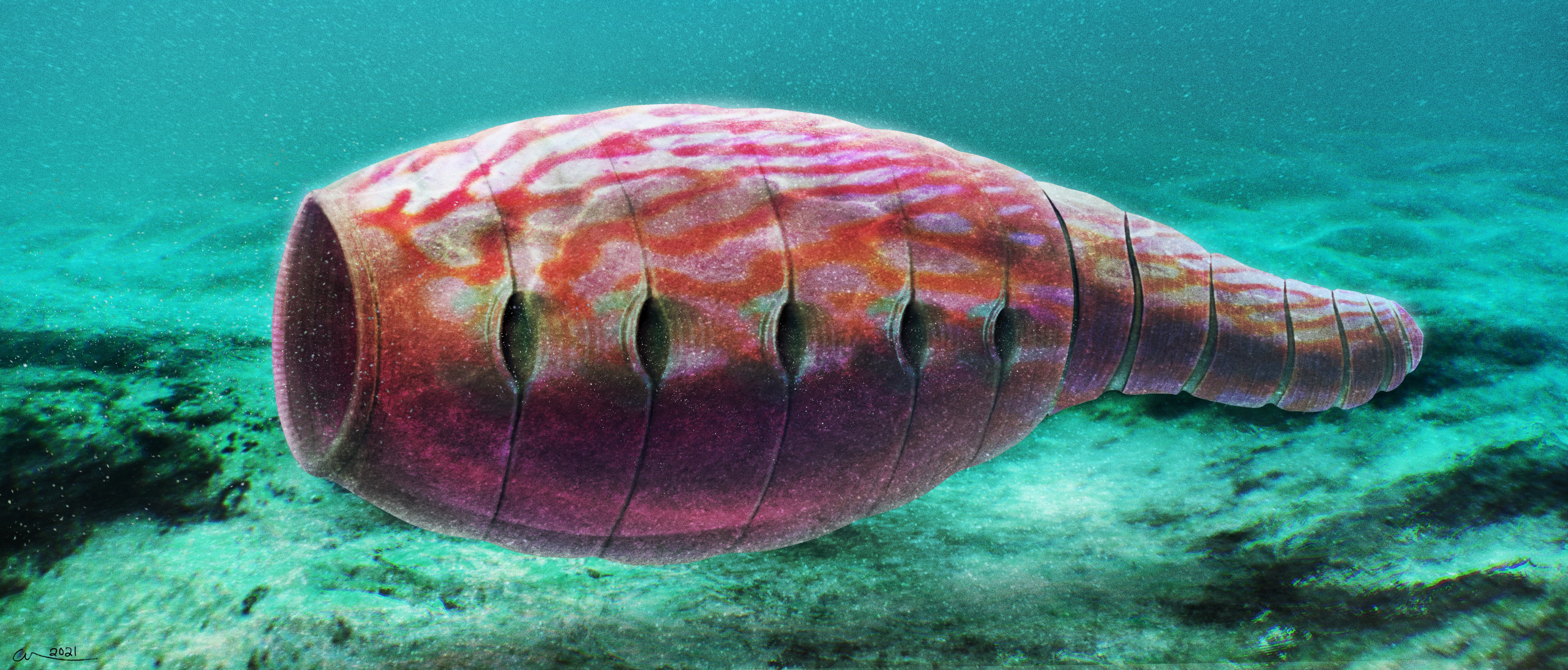
- Life restoration

Scientific classification
- Kingdom: Animalia
- Phylum: Chordata
- Clade?: †Vetulicolia
- Class: †Vetulicolida
- Order: †Vetulicolata
- Family: †Didazoonidae
- Genus: †Yuyuanozoon; Chen et al., 2003

Type species
- †Yuyuanozoon magnificissimi Chen et al., 2003

= Yuyuanozoon =

Yuyuanozoon Temporal range: Cambrian Stage 3

Cambrian genus of animals

Yuyuanozoon magnificissimi, from the Cambrian Stage 3 Chengjiang lagerstatte, is the largest known vetulicolian, an extinct species of marine animal, with specimens up to 20 cm in length compared to 5–14 cm for other vetulicolian species.

== Etymology ==
The generic name translates as "Animal of Yu Yuan," Yu Yuan being an ancient name for Chengjiang County. The specific name, magnificissimi, translates as "of the most magnificent one," in reference to the great size of the holotype.

== Description ==
Its body is non-biomineralized and consists of an elongate ovoid anterior section, with a segmented posterior section roughly one-third of the width and half the length of the anterior. The anterior opening is wide, with a narrow, raised circumventing rim 5 mm posterior to the opening. The anterior section is divided into six subdivisions by five circumventing lines, with gill openings placed symmetrically on each side, coinciding with the lines. In the holotype, gill filaments are seen growing from the posterior side of the gill bars, but no filaments have been seen on the three more recently-examined specimens.

The posterior region consists of seven segments, each of which has five to six annulations (as also seen in Didazoon. It is more cylindrical than the posterior sections of other vetulicolians.

== Taxonomy ==
Yuyuanozoon is a member of the Didazoonidae. It was originally placed incertae sedis with in the phylum Vetulicolia, then moved under the Vetulicolidae in a comprehensive review of the phylum, and most recently reassigned to the Didazoonidae based on additional specimens that clearly show the details of the anterior opening as well as annulations on each posterior segment.

A 2024 study has found the Didazoonidae to be a paraphyletic grade of the vetulicolians closest to crownward chordates as shown in this simplified cladogram:

- Chordata (total group)
  - Banffia†
  - Heteromorphus†
  - - Skeemella†
    - - Nesonektris†
      - - Vetulicolidae†
        - - Didazoon†
          - Pomatrum†
          - Yuyuanozoon†
          - - Yunnanozoon†
            - - Cathaymyrus†
              - Pikaia†
              - Chordata
                (crown group)

An earlier study in 2014 placed vetulicolians as the sister-group to tunicates, but was unable to resolve any relationships among vetulicolians as a group:

- Vetulicolia†
  - Vetulicola†
  - Beidazoon†
  - Ooedigera†
  - Pomatrum† / Xidazoon†
  - Didazoon†
  - Yuyuanozoon†
  - Banffia†
  - Heteromorphus†
  - Nesonektris†
- Tunicata

== See also ==
- Maotianshan shales
