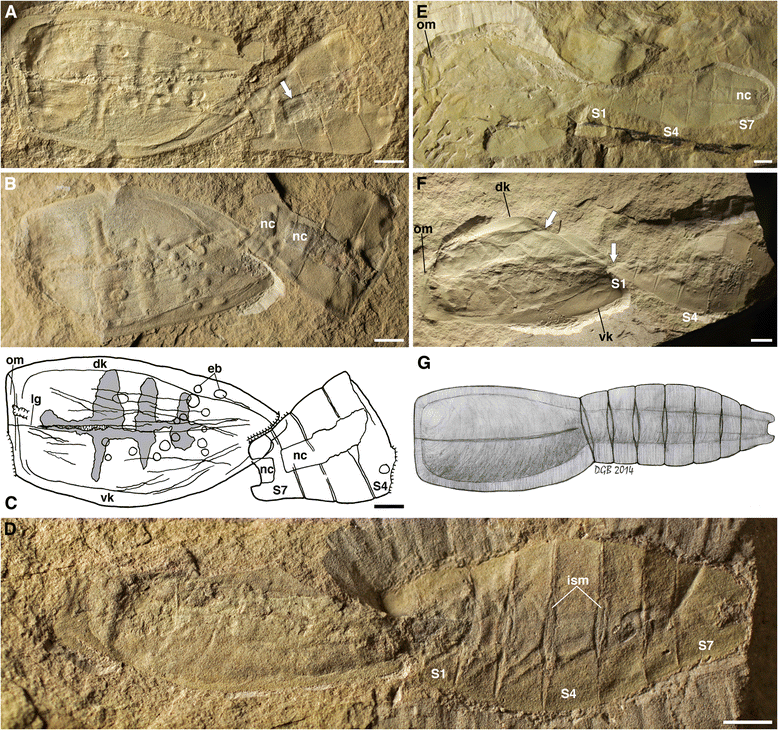
- Fossils

Scientific classification
- Kingdom: Animalia
- Phylum: Chordata
- Class: †Vetulicolida
- Genus: †Nesonektris
- Species: †N. aldridgei

Binomial name
- †Nesonektris aldridgei García-Bellido et al. 2014

= Nesonektris =

Nesonektris Temporal range: Late Botomian ~517 Ma

Extinct genus of Cambrian Era Chordate

Nesonektris aldridgei is an extinct vetulicolian from the Late Botomian-aged Emu Bay Shale Lagerstätte in Kangaroo Island, Australia. So far, it is the fourth described vetulicolian that is not restricted to the Maotianshan Shales (the other three being Ooedigera of Sirius Passet, Banffia of the Burgess Shale, and Skeemella of the Pierson Cove Formation above the Wheeler Shale).

== Description ==
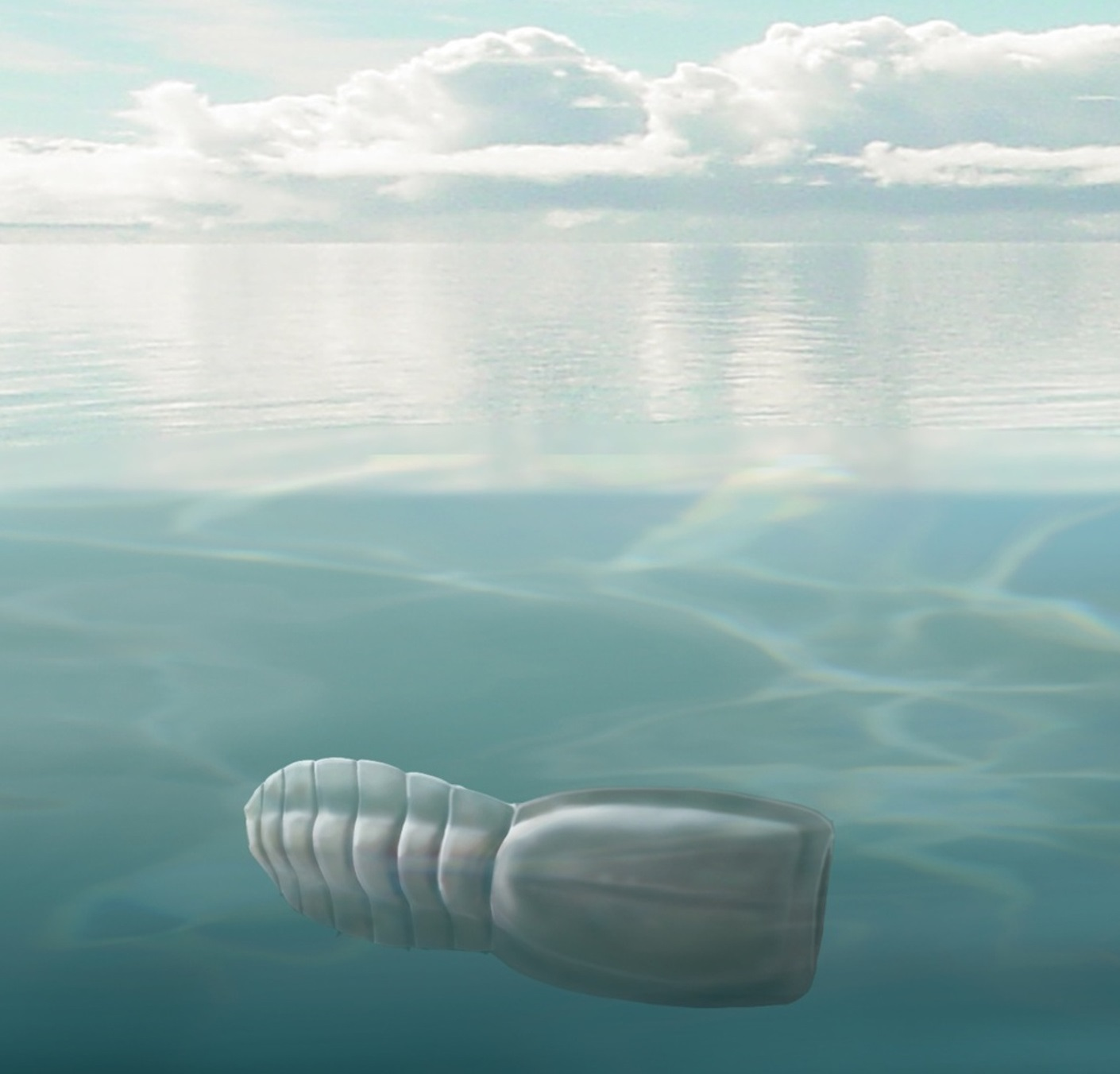
Restoration

N. aldridgei is known from several incomplete fossils which suggest that, in life, it was a fairly large animal (when compared to other vetulicolians). The largest fossil is about 150 millimetres (5.9 inches) long, leading researchers to estimate that that individual was about 170 millimetres (6.7 inches) long. The exquisitely preserved fossils show that running the length inside the tail was a notochord, thereby demonstrating the animal's chordate affinities as being related to tunicates. The forebody, and overall form are similar to vetulicolids of Vetulicolidae, though, its researchers do not have confidence to place N. aldridgei within either of the families within Vetulicolida (Vetulicolidae or Didazoonidae).

== Etymology ==
The genus name translates as "island swimmer" in reference to both its obvious adaptations for a nektonic lifestyle in the water column, and the great distance between Kangaroo Island and China, the primary center of vetulicolian diversity, even during Cambrian times. The specific name commemorates the efforts and memory of Richard "Dick" Aldridge for his crucial research in resolving vetulicolian affinities.

== Taxonomy ==
The discoverers of Nesonektris placed it in the class Vetulicolida outside of any order or family. While a 2018 paper placed it in the Didazoonidae, it did not discuss the reassignment in the text. The reassignment has not been broadly accepted, even by sources that accept the paper's other reassignment (of Yuyuanozoon to Didazoonidae).

A phylogenetic analysis by the discoverers of Nesonektris placed Vetulicolia as the sister-group of Tunicata, but was unable to resolve any internal relationships within the group:

- Vetulicolia†
  - Vetulicola†
  - Beidazoon†
  - Ooedigera†
  - Pomatrum† / Xidazoon†
  - Didazoon†
  - Yuyuanozoon†
  - Banffia†
  - Heteromorphus†
  - Nesonektris†
- Tunicata

However, several trees used to produce the cladogram above placed Nesonektris as an intermediate form between Banffia-type and Vetulicola-type forms, and a 2024 phylogenetic analysis agreed with that placement. Nesonektris is shown as the basal-most member of a paraphyletic vetulicolidan grade, crownward from Banffozoa but outside of either Vetulicolidae (labeled based on Li et al. 2018) or Didazoonidae. This study recovered Vetulicolia as a basal evolutionary grade along the chordate stem, rather than next to the tunicates:

- Chordata (total group)
  - Banffia†
  - Heteromorphus†
  - - Skeemella†
    - - Nesonektris†
      - - Vetulicolidae†
        - - Didazoon†
          - Pomatrum†
          - Yuyuanozoon†
          - - Yunnanozoon†
            - - Cathaymyrus†
              - Pikaia†
              - Chordata
                (crown group)
