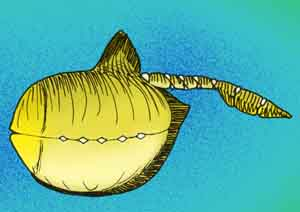
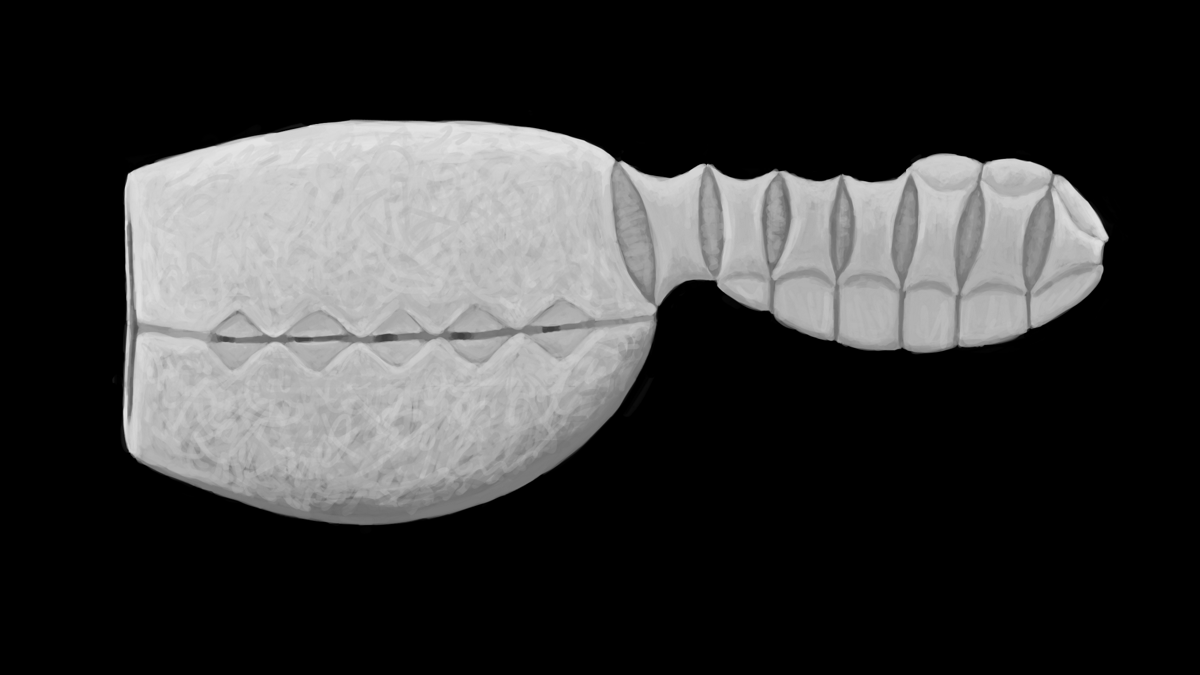
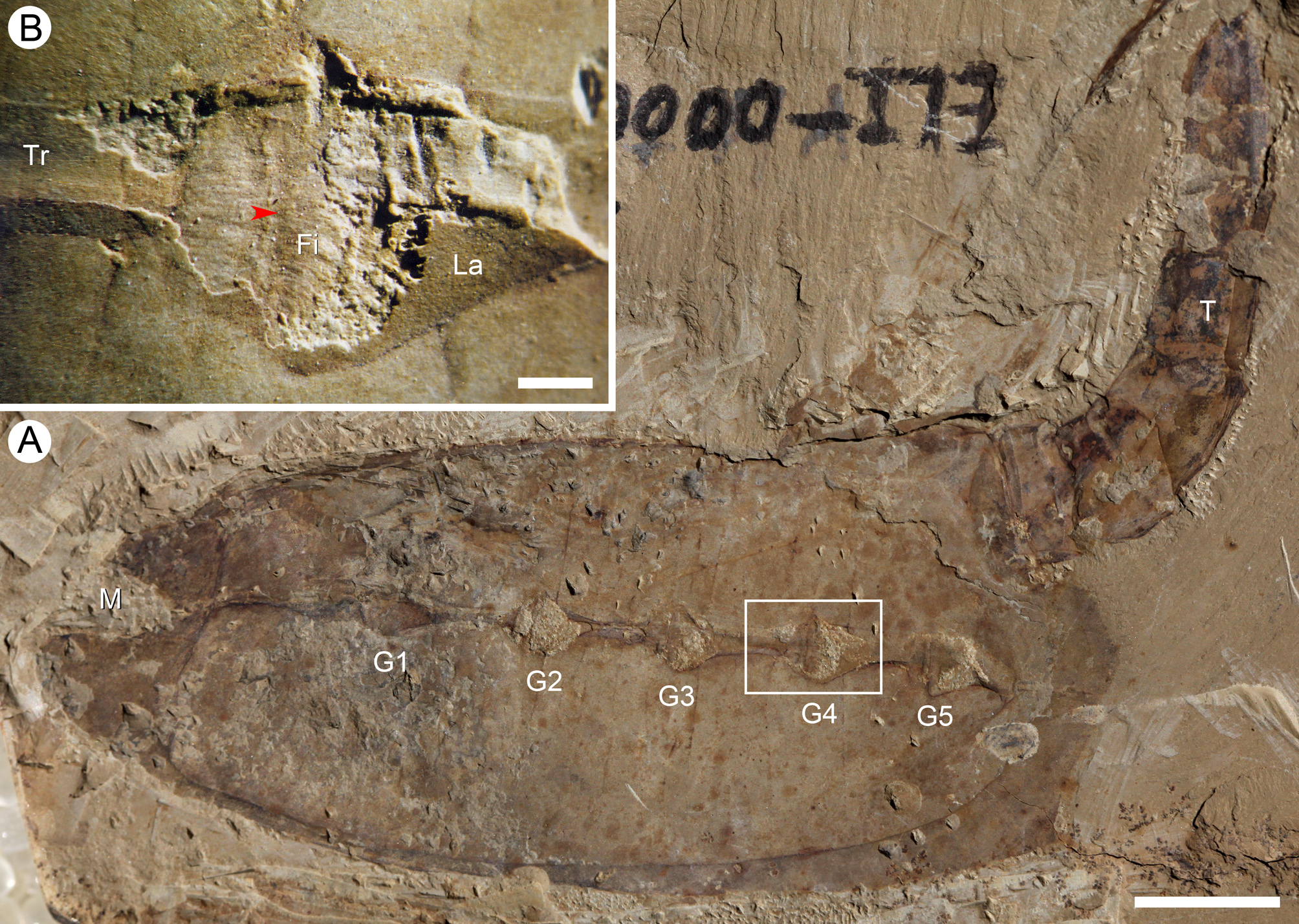
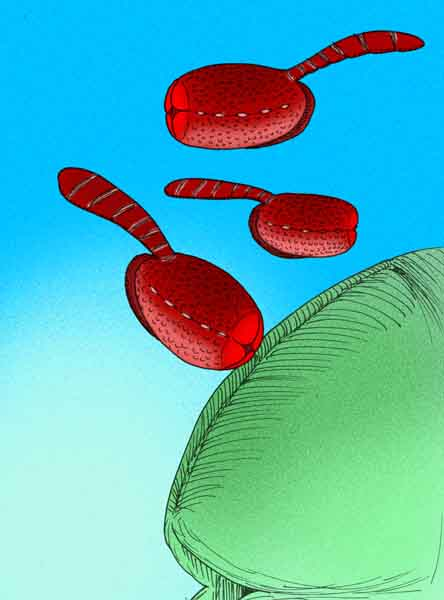
- Vetulicola gantoucunensis Ooedigera peeli Vetulicola rectangulata Beidazoon venustum Fossils and reconstructions of Vetulicolids

Scientific classification
- Kingdom: Animalia
- Phylum: Chordata
- Clade?: †Vetulicolia
- Class: †Vetulicolida
- Order: †Vetulicolata
- Family: †Vetulicolidae; Hou and Bergström 1997

Type genus
- †Vetulicola Hou 1987

Genera
- †Vetulicola Hou 1987; †Beidazoon Shu 2005; †Ooedigera Vinther et al. 2011

= Vetulicolidae =

Vetulicolidae Temporal range: Cambrian Stage 3

Extinct Cambrian family of vetulicolian animals

Vetulicolidae is a vetulicolian family from the Cambrian Stage 3 Maotianshan Shale and Sirius Passet Lagerstätte that consists of Vetulicola, Beidazoon, and Ooedigera. It is distinguished from the Didazoonidae by a harder body wall and the lack of an oral disc.

== Description ==
Members of the Vetulicolidae have relatively robust body coverings, with a subquadrate to elongate (in lateral view) anterior part and an elongate, segmented posterior part. The marginal zone of the anterior part may have short projections dorsally and postereodorsally. As diagnosed by Aldridge et al. in 2007, the anterior part is said to bear five annulations, and a lateral groove is not mentioned for the family. However, with and the addition of Ooedigera not all genera possess annulations in the anterior section, and with the re-classification of Yuyuannozoon each genus currently assigned to this family bears a lateral groove.

Vetulicolids range in size from Beidazoon (around 1 cm long) to Vetulicola (around 8 or 9 cm). Ooedigera is in-between at a little over 4 cm. The anterior parts of Ooedigera and Beidazoon bear textural ornamentation.

== Distribution ==
Ooedigera is known from the Sirius Passet Lagerstätte in far northern Greenland, while Beidazoon is known only from the Chengjiang fauna. Vetulicola is known from the Chengjiang fauna, the Guanshan biota (both of the Maotianshan Shales of China), as well as the Mural Formation of the Canadian Rockies. The Banffozoa have a similar distribution, while the Didazoonidae are limited to the Maotianshan Shales.

== Taxonomy ==
The composition of the Vetulicolidae has seen several changes. Yuyuanozoon was at one point placed in the family, but has since been moved to the Didazoonidae. Beidazoon was initially placed in its own family, Beidazoonidae, but its junior synonym Bullivetula was placed in the Vetulicolidae and later authors have followed that placement.

A 2024 study has found Vetulicolidae (as defined in a 2018 phylogeny) to be a monophyletic group within a paraphyletic Vetulicolia, crownwards of Banffozoa and Nesonektris but basal to Didazoonidae. It is the only vetulicolian family that was recovered as a monophyletic clade:

- Chordata (total group)
  - Banffia†
  - Heteromorphus†
  - - Skeemella†
    - - Nesonektris†
      - - Vetulicolidae†
          - Ooedigera†
          - - Vetulicola cuneata†
            - Vetulicola gantoucunensis†
            - Vetulicola longbaoshanensis†
            - Vetulicola rectangulata†
            - - Vetulicola monile†
              - Beidazoon†
        - - Didazoon†
          - Pomatrum†
          - Yuyuanozoon†
          - - Yunnanozoon†
            - - Cathaymyrus†
              - Pikaia†
              - Chordata
                (crown group)

An earlier study in 2014 placed vetulicolians as the sister-group to tunicates, but was unable to resolve any relationships among vetulicolians as a group:

- Vetulicolia†
  - Vetulicola†
  - Beidazoon†
  - Ooedigera†
  - Pomatrum† / Xidazoon†
  - Didazoon†
  - Yuyuanozoon†
  - Banffia†
  - Heteromorphus†
  - Nesonektris†
- Tunicata
