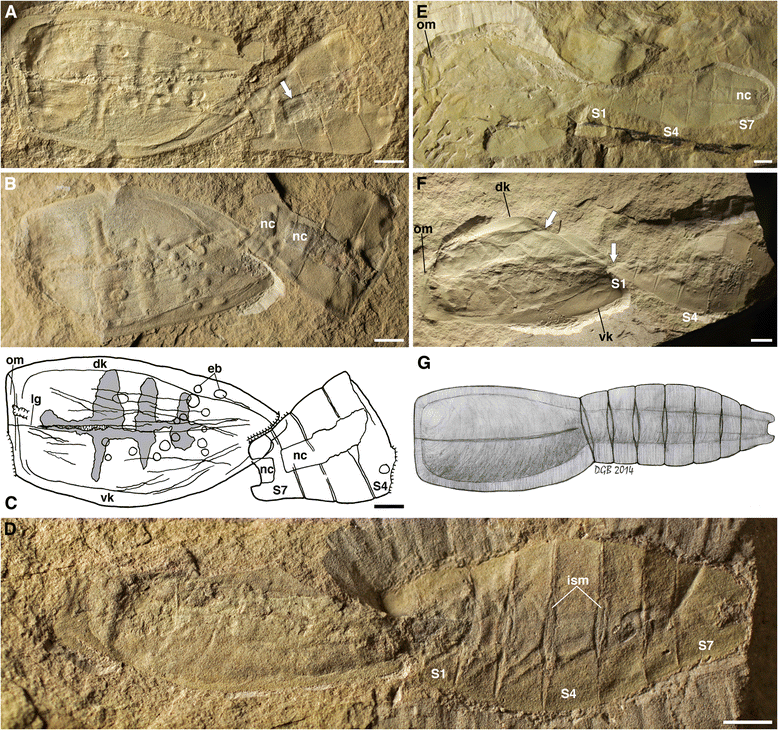
- Fossils and diagrams of Nesonektris
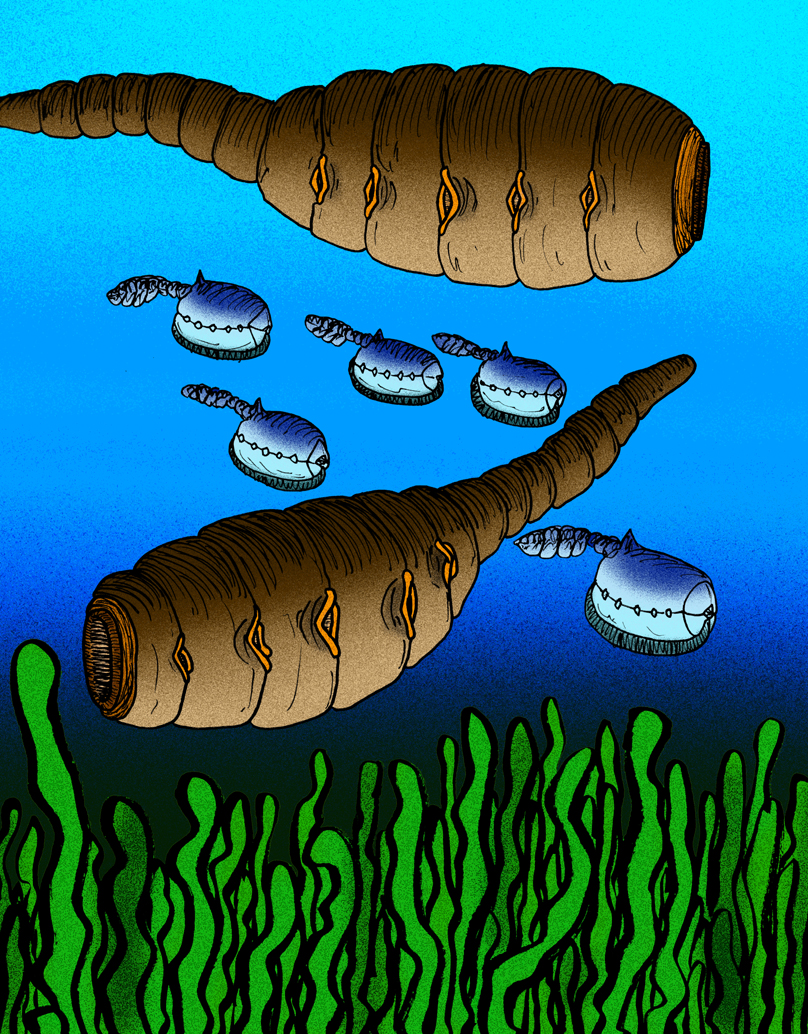
- Artist's reconstruction of Yuyuanozoon (a didazoonid, foreground) and Vetulicola rectangulata (a vetulicolid)

Scientific classification
- Kingdom: Animalia
- Phylum: Chordata
- Clade?: †Vetulicolia
- Class: †Vetulicolida; Chen and Zhou, 1997

Orders
- †Vetulicolata; †Vetulicolidae; †Didazoonidae; incertae sedis; †Nesonektris

= Vetulicolida =

Vetulicolida Temporal range: Cambrian Stage 3

Extinct Cambrian group of marine animals

Vetulicolida is a class of vetulicolians. It consists of the order Vetulicolata (which contains the families Vetulicolidae and Didazoonidae) and the genus Nesonektris, which is of uncertain placement. It is distinguished from the Banffozoa by the number and size of posterior segments as well as features of the anterior section.

== Description ==
The Vetulicolidans anterior body appears to consist of fused segments, with five gill pouches at the intersections of the segment boundaries and a lateral groove that does not reach the posterior edge. The posterior section is clearly segmented with relatively wide segments comparred to banffozoans such as Banffia or Heteromorphus.

== Taxonomy ==
In 1997, Chen and Zhou defined Vetulicolida as a class to contain Vetulicola and Banffia. Hou and Bergström also defined Vetulicolida that same year, but as an order containing the new family Vetulicolidae. The name Vetulicolida was used at either or both ranks until 2007, when a comprehensive phylogeny renamed the order to Vetulicolata. By this point Banffia had been moved to its own class, Banffozoa.

Nesonektris has been proposed to be a didazoonid, but this has not been broadly accepted, even by sources that accept the paper's other reassignment (of Yuyuanozoon to Didazoonidae).

A 2024 analysis found Vetulicolida to be the more recent portion of a paraphyletic grade leading to more crownward chordates, with Nesonektris basal to Vetulicolata (Vetulicolidae is labeled according to a 2018 phylogeny):

- Chordata (total group)
  - Banffia†
  - Heteromorphus†
  - - Skeemella†
    - - Nesonektris†
      - - Vetulicolidae†
        - - Didazoon†
          - Pomatrum†
          - Yuyuanozoon†
          - - Yunnanozoon†
            - - Cathaymyrus†
              - Pikaia†
              - Chordata
                (crown group)

An earlier study in 2014 placed vetulicolians as the sister-group to tunicates, but was unable to resolve any relationships among vetulicolians as a group:

- Vetulicolia†
  - Vetulicola†
  - Beidazoon†
  - Ooedigera†
  - Nesonektris†
  - Pomatrum† / Xidazoon†
  - Didazoon†
  - Yuyuanozoon†
  - Banffia†
  - Heteromorphus†
- Tunicata
