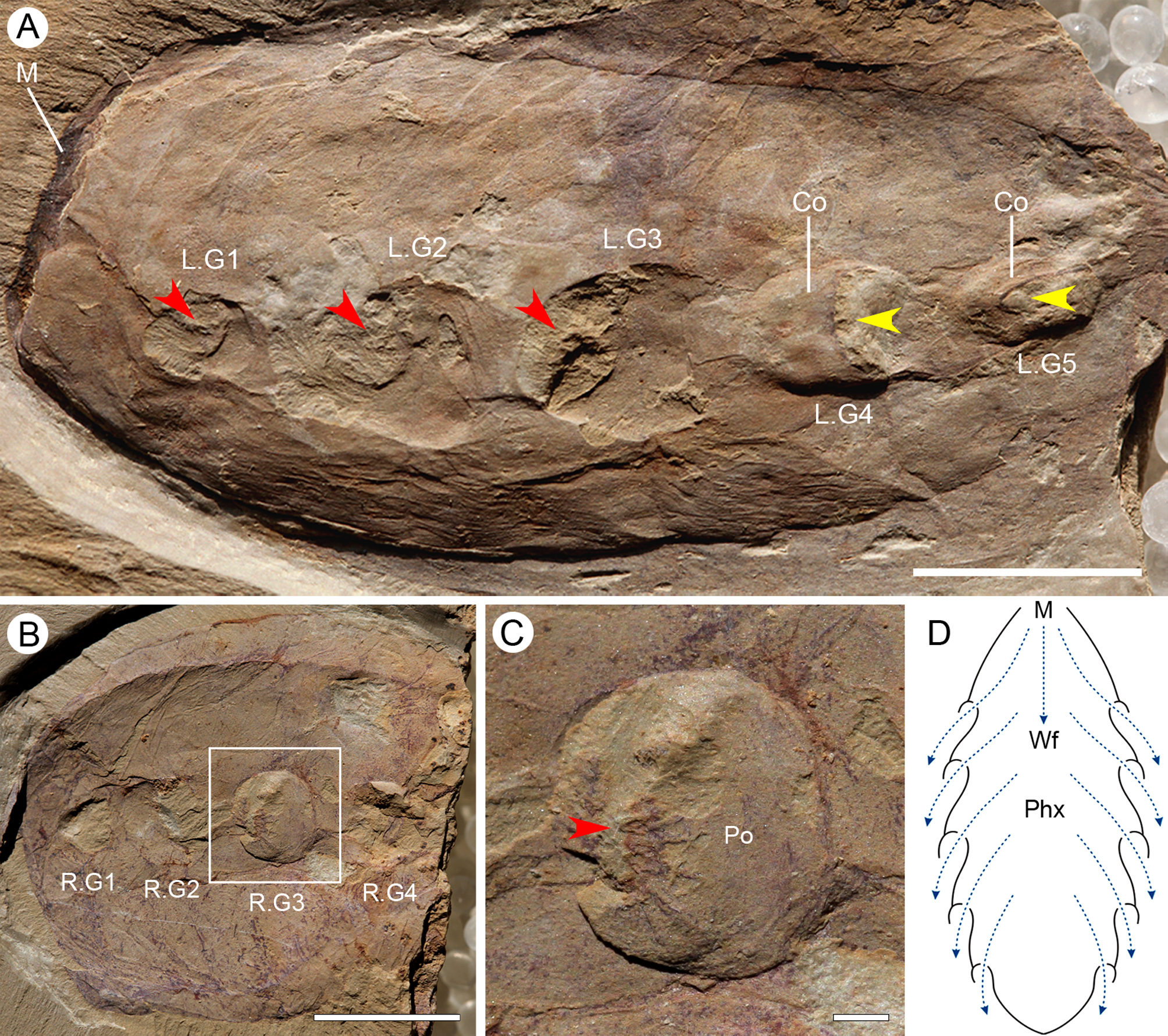
- Fossils
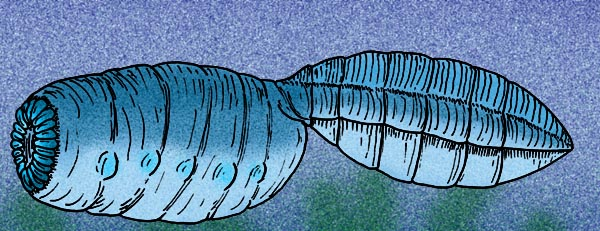
- Restoration

Scientific classification
- Domain: Eukaryota
- Kingdom: Animalia
- Phylum: Chordata
- Clade?: †Vetulicolia
- Class: †Vetulicolida
- Order: †Vetulicolata
- Family: †Didazoonidae
- Genus: †Didazoon; Shu & Han, 2001
- Species: †D. haoae

Binomial name
- †Didazoon haoae Shu & Han, 2001

= Didazoon =

Didazoon Temporal range: Cambrian Stage 3

Cambrian age animal

Didazoon haoae is an extinct species of vetulicolid vetulicolian described by Shu, et al. based on fossils found in the Qiongzhusi (Chiungchussu) Formation, Yu'anshan Member (Eoredlichia zone), Lower Cambrian, in the Dabanqiao area (Kunming), about 60 km northwest of Chengjiang, China.

== Etymology ==
"Dida" abbreviates (in Chinese) the China University of Geosciences.

== Description ==
The fossils show that the body of the animal was covered in a thin, flexible cuticle. The anterior part of the body was divided into six segments, with fairly broad membranes separating the segments, and the posterior part of the body was divided into seven segments. The constriction between the anterior and posterior parts of the animal shows creasing, and the authors hypothesize that it was quite flexible. The fossils are interpreted as showing a large anterior opening, presumably a mouth, a spacious anterior cavity, an alimentary canal, possibly voluminous in the anterior section, and a narrow intestine in the posterior section, straight or coiled (in one specimen). There are five structures on each side of the anterior portion that the authors interpret as gills. Narrow strands towards the lateral margins, sometimes branched, may represent vascular tissue. The authors also identify a dark strand on the lower interior surface of the anterior section, which they speculate is an endostyle.

== Taxonomy ==
Didazoon is the type genus of the Didazoonidae, which one 2024 study has found to be a paraphyletic grade of the vetulicolians closest to crownward chordates as shown in this simplified cladogram, which labels Vetulicolidae based on a 2018 phylogeny and Didazoonidae based on the Paleobiology Database:

- Chordata (total group)
  - Banffia†
  - Heteromorphus†
  - - Skeemella†
    - - Nesonektris†
      - - Vetulicolidae†
        - - Didazoon†
          - Pomatrum†
          - Yuyuanozoon†
          - - Yunnanozoon†
            - - Cathaymyrus†
              - Pikaia†
              - Chordata
                (crown group)

An earlier study in 2014 place vetulicolians as the sister-group to tunicates, but was unable to resolve any relationships among vetulicolians as a group:

- Vetulicolia†
  - Vetulicola†
  - Beidazoon†
  - Ooedigera†
  - Pomatrum† / Xidazoon†
  - Didazoon†
  - Yuyuanozoon†
  - Banffia†
  - Heteromorphus†
  - Nesonektris†
- Tunicata

== See also ==
- Maotianshan shales
