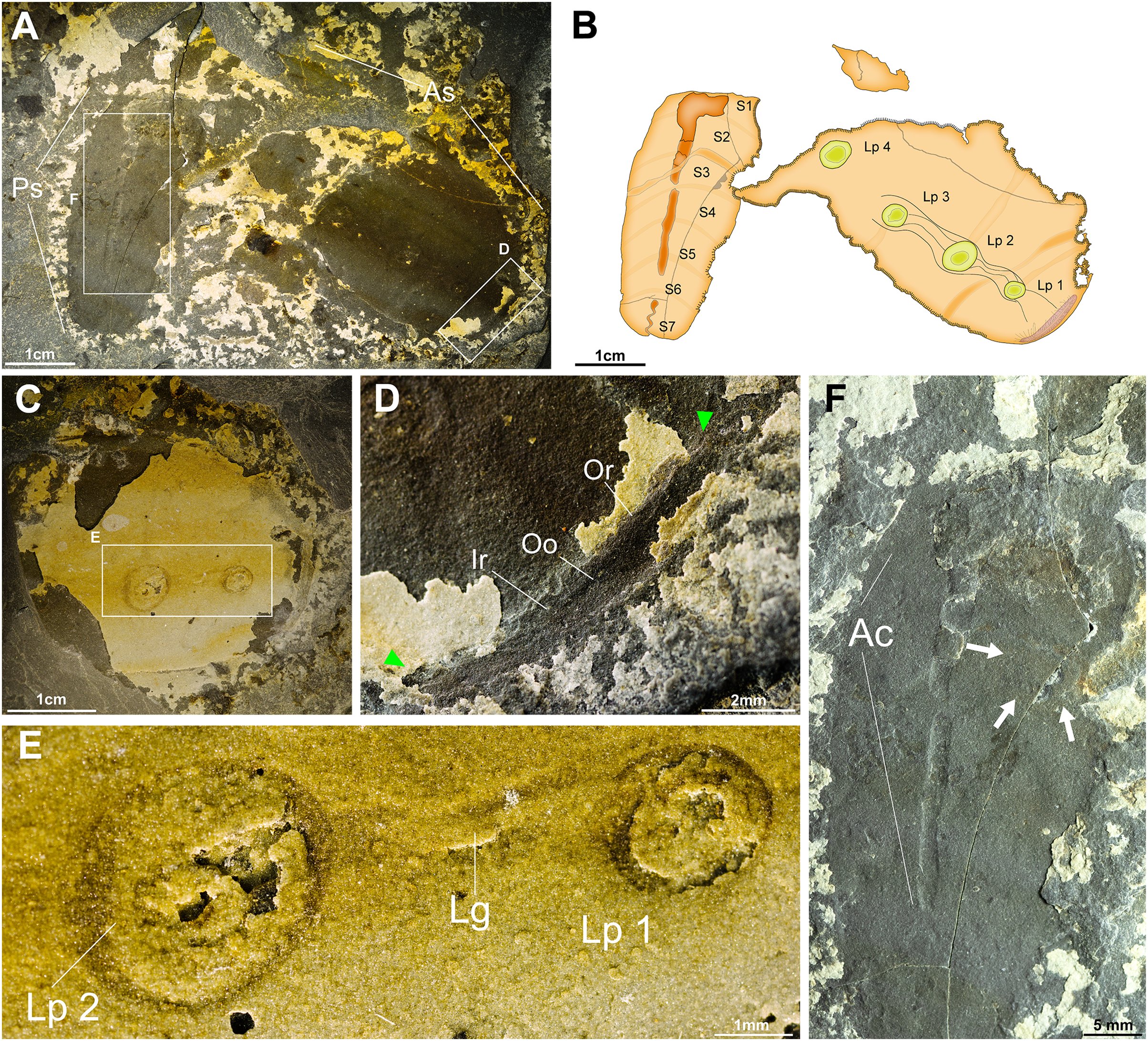
- Specimen of Pomatrum cf. ventralis from the Balang Formation

Scientific classification
- Kingdom: Animalia
- Phylum: Chordata
- Clade?: †Vetulicolia
- Class: †Vetulicolida
- Order: †Vetulicolata
- Family: †Didazoonidae
- Genus: †Pomatrum; Luo and Hu, in Luo et al., 1999
- Species: †P. ventralis

Binomial name
- †Pomatrum ventralis Luo and Hu, in Luo et al., 1999

Synonyms
- Xidazoon stephanus

= Pomatrum =

Pomatrum Temporal range: Cambrian Stage 3–Cambrian Stage 4

Cambrian age animal

Pomatrum is an extinct vetulicolian, the senior synonym of Xidazoon; the latter taxon was described by Shu, et al. (1999) based on fossils found in the Qiongzhusi (Chiungchussu) Formation, Yu'anshan Member (Eoredlichia zone), Lower Cambrian, Haikou, (Kunming), about 50 km west of Chengjiang, China.

The fossils show that the body of the animal was divided into two parts. The anterior part of the body is moderately inflated, with a prominent mouth circlet. It has faint transverse divisions towards the front, but is otherwise smooth. The mouth circlet consists of about 30 plates divided into inner and outer regions. The anterior section has five structures on each side, which are interpreted as gills. A dark region running close to the ventral and posterior margins is interpreted as an endostyle. The condition of the anterior portion of the fossils suggests that it was thin-walled, i.e., that the anterior portion was largely hollow. The posterior part of the body tapers towards front and back (diamond-shaped), and is divided into seven segments covered in cuticle with three less well-defined segments at the anterior end. There are short spines at the posterior tip. The authors describe an alimentary canal with terminal openings and a rectum with what might be dilator muscles.

== Taxonomy ==
Pomatrum is a member of the Didazoonidae, which one 2024 study has found to be a paraphyletic grade of the vetulicolians closest to crownward chordates as shown in this simplified cladogram:

- Chordata (total group)
  - Banffia†
  - Heteromorphus†
  - - Skeemella†
    - - Nesonektris†
      - - Vetulicolidae†
        - - Didazoon†
          - Pomatrum†
          - Yuyuanozoon†
          - - Yunnanozoon†
            - - Cathaymyrus†
              - Pikaia†
              - Chordata
                (crown group)

An earlier study in 2014 place vetulicolians as the sister-group to tunicates, but was unable to resolve any relationships among vetulicolians as a group:

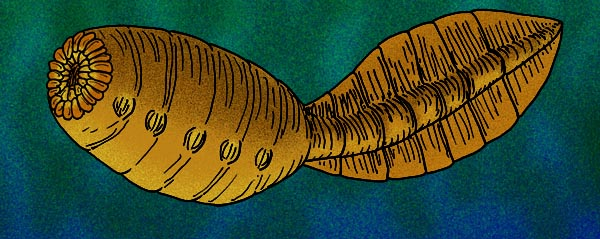
Artist's conception

- Vetulicolia†
  - Vetulicola†
  - Beidazoon†
  - Ooedigera†
  - Pomatrum† / Xidazoon†
  - Didazoon†
  - Yuyuanozoon†
  - Banffia†
  - Heteromorphus†
  - Nesonektris†
- Tunicata

=== Relationship to Xidazoon ===
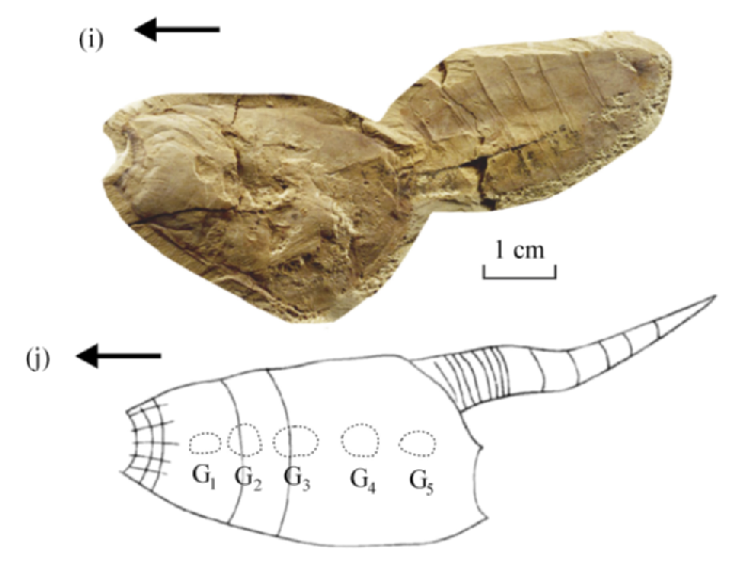
Illustration from Shu (2005), arguing against the synonomy of X. stephanus (i) and the P. ventralis holotype (j); note that Aldridge et al. (2007) includes plates showing a different P. ventralis specimen with a wider tail.

Based on a comparison of the incomplete/damaged holotype with the incomplete/damaged holotype of Pomatrum ventralis, a comprehensive examination of the vetulicolian systematics published in 2007 accepted a 2002 proposal that X. stephanus was a junior synonym of P. ventralis because the anterior portions of the two species are largely identical. This proposal has been accepted by a number of other workers, although in some cases, notably including one co-authored by all authors of the 2007 comprehensive examination, only tentatively.

Prior to this, Xidazoon had been treated as a separate genus by workers aware of Pomatrum, who argue that Pomatrum has more than the seven posterior segments found in Xidazoon. Some workers have continued to treat the genera as separate at least as recently as 2023.

=== Possible Relationship to Pipiscius ===
Upon its discovery, Xidazoon was likened to the Carboniferous chordate Pipiscius on account of having a similar anterior circlet, although it was noted that the similarities could be due to convergence. A later assessment of chordate phylogeny noted the possible connection while discussing Pipiscius as a possible hagfish relative, but also noted that the position of Xidazoon among the chordates was not certain. A recent phylogenetic analysis of vetulicolians and other early chordates did not including Pipiscius.

== See also ==
- Maotianshan shales
