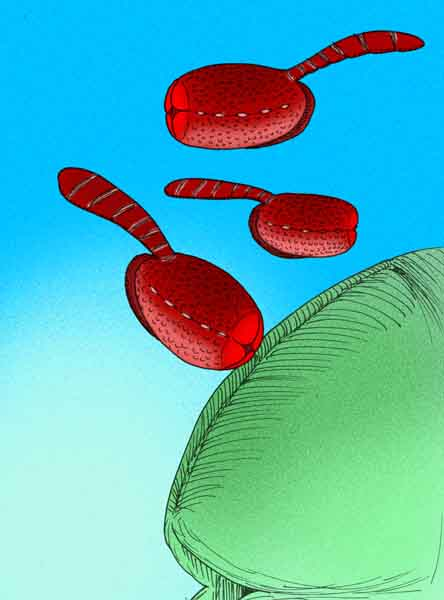

Scientific classification
- Kingdom: Animalia
- Phylum: Chordata
- Clade?: †Vetulicolia
- Class: †Vetulicolida
- Order: †Vetulicolata
- Family: †Vetulicolidae
- Genus: †Beidazoon
- Species: †B. venustum

Binomial name
- †Beidazoon venustum Shu, 2005

Synonyms
- Bullivetula variola Aldridge et al., 2007

= Beidazoon =

Beidazoon Temporal range: Chengjiang

Extinct species of Cambrian organism

Beidazoon venustum is a marine deuterostome from the group Vetulicolia. It originates from the lower Cambrian Chengjiang biota of Yunnan Province, China, and was discovered in 2005. It is known as the smallest described vetulicolian, and for its surface being covered in many small nodes.

== Description ==
Beidazoon venustum had a hard outer shell similar to Vetulicola, with a single band mouth. Its tail is asymmetrical and composed of a hard shell extending from the upper posterior, an axial lobe of seven segments, and a ventral lobe with four or five segments. According to its discoverer, Beidazoon's shell was "beautifully ornamented with numerous nodes".

== Taxonomy ==
The family Beidazoonidae was erected to house Beidazoon at the time of its discovery. However, Beidazoon's junior synonym Bullivetula was assigned to Vetulicolidae, and other authors have accepted that assignment for Beidazoon.

One 2024 study found Beidazoon to be nestled within Vetulicola as a sister to V. monile within a monophyletic Vetulicolidae:

- Vetulicolidae†
  - Ooedigera†
  - - Vetulicola cuneata†
    - Vetulicola gantoucunensis†
    - Vetulicola longbaoshanensis†
    - Vetulicola rectangulata†
    - - Vetulicola monile†
      - Beidazoon†

An earlier study in 2014 treated Vetulicola as monophyletic, but was unable to resolve any relationships among vetulicolians as a group:

- Vetulicolia†
  - Vetulicola†
  - Pomatrum† / Xidazoon†
  - Didazoon†
  - Beidazoon†
  - Yuyuanozoon†
  - Banffia†
  - Heteromorphus†
  - Ooedigera†
  - Nesonektris†
