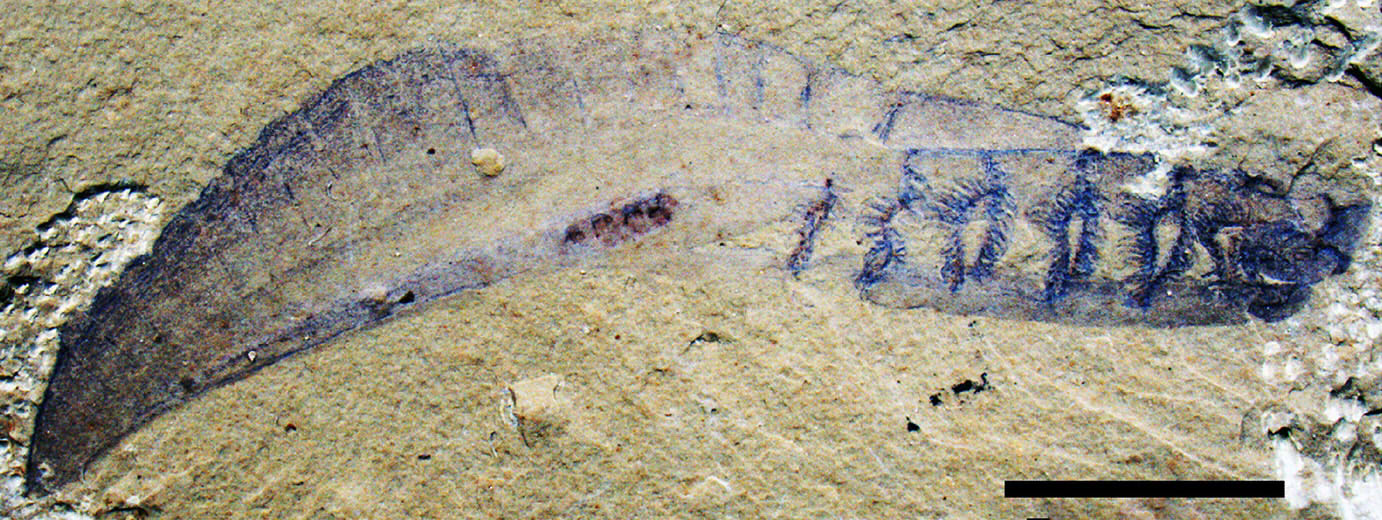
- Fossil of Yunnanozoon lividum

Scientific classification
- Kingdom: Animalia
- Phylum: Chordata
- Family: †Yunnanozoidae; Dzik, 1995
- Genus: †Yunnanozoon; Hou, Ramskold & Bergstrom, 1991
- Species: †Y. lividum

Binomial name
- †Yunnanozoon lividum Hou, Ramskold & Bergstrom, 1991

Synonyms
- Haikouella Chen, Huang & Li, 1999

= Yunnanozoon =

Yunnanozoon Temporal range: Chengjiang

Cambrian fossil chordate

Yunnanozoon lividum (from Yunnan, and Ancient Greek ζῷον (zôion), meaning "animal", with specific name coming from Latin lividum (lead-coloured), referring to preserved colour of specimens) is an extinct species of bilaterian animal from the Lower Cambrian Chengjiang biota of Yunnan province, China. Its affinities have long been the subject of controversy, though it is now generally considered a primitive chordate.

== Description ==
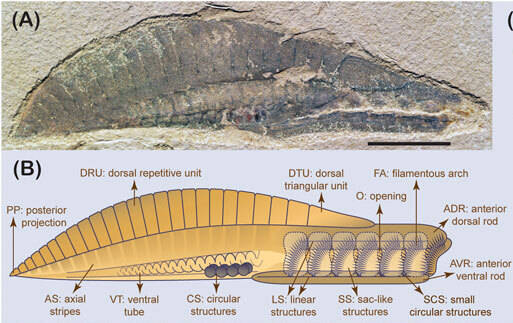
Size of Yunnanozoon (dark green) compared to other Cambrian chordates, and a well preserved specimen and diagrammatic reconstruction

The body of Yunnanozoon was fusiform, with specimens ranging from 2 to 6 centimetres (0.79 to 2.36 in) in length. The body was strongly laterally compressed, meaning that it was taller than it was wide. A segmented dorsal unit was present on the top of the body. The first segment of which was triangular, while the other segments were approximately rectangular. Axial stripes also ran down the body in the region immediately below the dorsal unit. Towards the front of the animal were 7 pairs of filamentous arches. These arches were covered by sac-like structures which had openings between them. Towards the back of the body a tube-like structure was present, possibly the gut, with four pairs of enigmatic circular structures at the mid-point of the body.

These circular structures may be gonads, though one study from 2026 considers them to more likely be glomeruli (networks of blood vessels located in the kidney that are involved in renal filtration), arguing that if these structures were gonads, one would expect their morphology to vary between specimens due to differences such as the sex of the individual and the point in the spawning cycle the individual was in when it died, yet the circular structures look very similar in all specimens. One potential issue with this interpretation is that for glomeruli to function, blood must be forced out of the glomerulus by the pressure created by the beating of the heart, yet no systemic heart has been preserved in any Yunnanozoon fossil. Lancelets, which also have no systemic heart, rely on contractions of the aorta, with assistance from swollen structures known as branchial hearts. Similar branchial hearts are known in Yunnanozoon. Although in lancelets the pressure created by this setup is not enough to allow for vertebrate-like glomeruli, it has been suggested that Yunnanozoon may have had a more powerful version of this setup so that it could support vertebrate-like glomeruli.

The front half of the body had rod-like structures running along the top and bottom, which were probably sclerotized. Yunnanozoon fossils also preserve evidence of structures which may be dorsal and ventral aortae. This interpretation is supported by their three-dimensional, tube-shaped structure, the presence of material inside that may be coagulated blood, and by chemical signatures indicative of iron and protein. It is suggested that the mouth opening had cirri tentacles.

== Taxonomy ==
Yunnanozoon was described by Hou, Ramskold & Bergstrom in 1991, who considered its placement to be incertae sedis within Metazoa. The placement of Yunnanozoon has been controversial, with various studies suggesting placements as a cephalochordate, a stem-chordate, a hemichordate, a stem-vertebrate, a stem-deuterostome, an ambulacrarian, a bilaterian of uncertain placement, as a protostome of uncertain position, or a relative of Ecdysozoa.

In 1995, Jerzy Dzik placed Yunnanozoon into its own class, order and family: Yunnanozoa, Yunnanozoida and Yunnanozoidae, respectively. In 1999, Jun-Yuan Chen and colleagues described a new genus and species Haikouella lanceolata, proposed to be a close relative of Yunnanozoon. A second species of the genus Haikouella, H. jianshanensis, was described by Degan Shu and colleagues in 2003. The describers of Haikouella distinguished it from Yunnanozoon based on the number of filamentous arches and circular structures, and the placement of structure proposed to be pharyngeal teeth. However, Pei-Yun Cong and colleagues found in their comprehensive 2015 study that the number of filamentous arches and circular structures were the same in both genera, and that the supposed "pharyngeal teeth" were instead remnants of other structures. They thus concluded that both species of Haikouella should be considered a junior synonym of Yunnanozoon lividum.

Cong and colleagues also considered Yunnanozoon to be a member of Bilateria of uncertain placement. A 2022 study of the filamentous arches using advanced imaging techniques suggested that they were "composed of cartilage within an extracellular matrix of micofibrils", suggesting that yunannozoans were stem-vertebrates.

A 2024 study motivated by a reinterpretation of the fossil Pikaia placed Yunnanozoon as a transitional stem-chordate form between a paraphyletic Vetulicolia and the more crownward Chordata as shown on this simplified cladogram:

- Chordata (total group)
  - Banffia†
  - Heteromorphus†
  - - Skeemella†
    - - Nesonektris†
      - - Vetulicolidae†
        - - Didazoon†
          - Pomatrum†
          - Yuyuanozoon†
          - - Yunnanozoon†
            - - Cathaymyrus†
              - Pikaia†
              - Chordata (crown group)
                - Cephalochordata
                - - Tunicata
                  - - Metaspriggina†
                    - - Myllokunmingia†
                      - Vertebrata

== Paleoecology ==
Yunannozoon is suggested to have been a filter feeder on small particulate matter engulfed using its mouth, using its filamentous arches to filter food from the water (analogously to how gill rakers work in modern filter-feeding fish), with the openings on the side of the body being used to expel water, with the cirri tentacles at the front of the mouth preventing large particles such as sand grains from blocking the opening.

== See also ==
- Metaspriggina
- Pikaia
