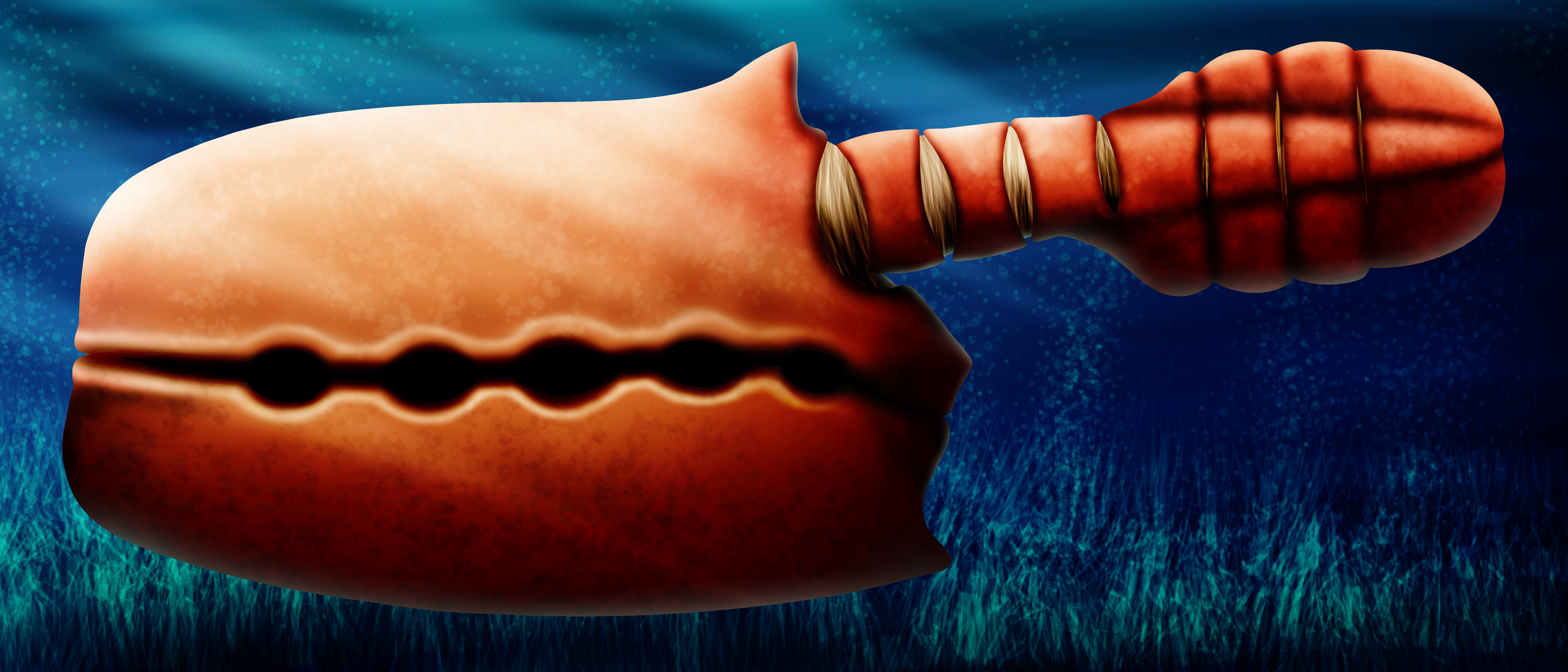
- Life restoration of Vetulicola rectangulata

Scientific classification
- Kingdom: Animalia
- Phylum: Chordata
- Clade?: †Vetulicolia
- Class: †Vetulicolida
- Order: †Vetulicolata
- Family: †Vetulicolidae
- Genus: †Vetulicola
- Species: †V. rectangulata

Binomial name
- †Vetulicola rectangulata Luo and Hu, 1999

= Vetulicola rectangulata =

Vetulicola rectangulata Temporal range: Cambrian Stage 3

Extinct animal from Cambrian of the Chengjiang biota of China

Vetulicola rectangulata (meaning "rectangular ancient dweller") is a species of extinct animal from the Early Cambrian of the Chengjiang biota of China. Regarded as a deuterostome, it has characteristic rectangular anterior body on which the posterior tail region is attached. It was described by Luo Huilin and Hu Shi-xue in 1999.

== Description ==
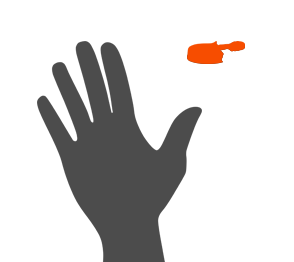
Size comparison

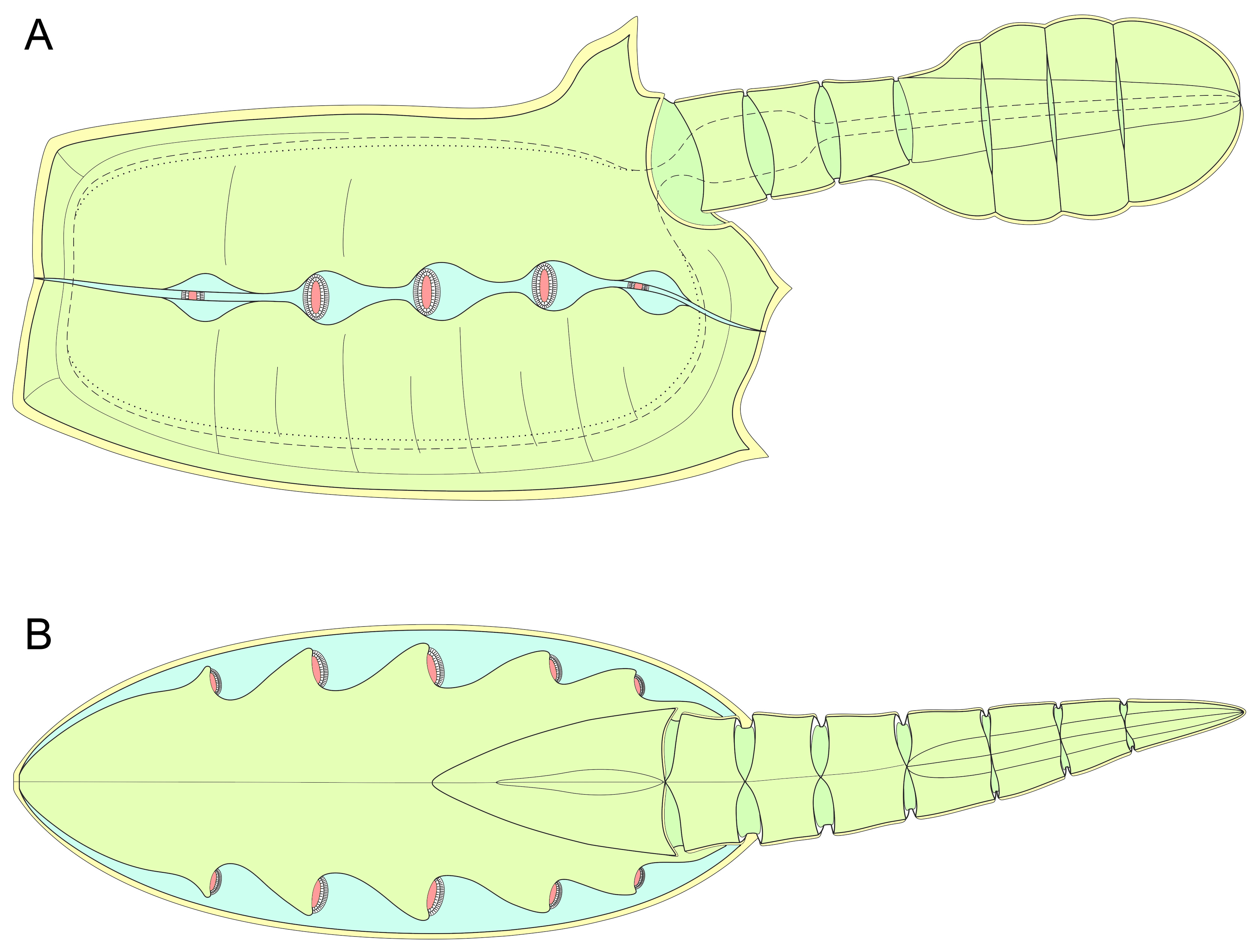
Schematic of V. rectangulata pharynx and alimentary canal: dashed line; dorsal and ventral food grooves: dotted line; gill slits: pink

V. rectangulata was described by Luo Huilin and Hu Shi-xue of the Yunnan Institute of Biological Science in 1999. The fossils were discovered from the Early Cambrian Chengjiang deposits in Kunming region, Yunnan, China.

Like V. cuneata, V. rectangulata has a body composed of two distinct parts of approximately equal length. The anterior part is oval to rectangular in shape, enclosed by a carapace-like structure of four rigid cuticular plates fused together, with a small mouth at the front end: there is a keel-like extension of the body wall on the top and belly. Unlike in V. cuneata, the mouth region does not protrude out. The tail-like posterior section is slender, strongly cuticularised and placed dorsally. Paired openings connecting the pharynx to the outside run down the sides. These features are interpreted as possible primitive gill slits. Vetulicola rectangulata could be up to 7.2 cm long, and up to 3.7 cm in height (most specimens being 3.6 cm high).

== Lifestyle ==
It is assumed that V. rectangulata spent most or all of its time swimming in the water column. Sediment found within the gut suggest that it was a deposit-feeder, possibly swimming to and from favorable feeding sites. At least one specimen has an individual of the putative entoproct, Cotyledion tyloides attached to the terminal segment of the tail.
