= China University of Geosciences =

China University of Geosciences may refer to two independent and separated universities:

- China University of Geosciences (Beijing)
- China University of Geosciences (Wuhan)
