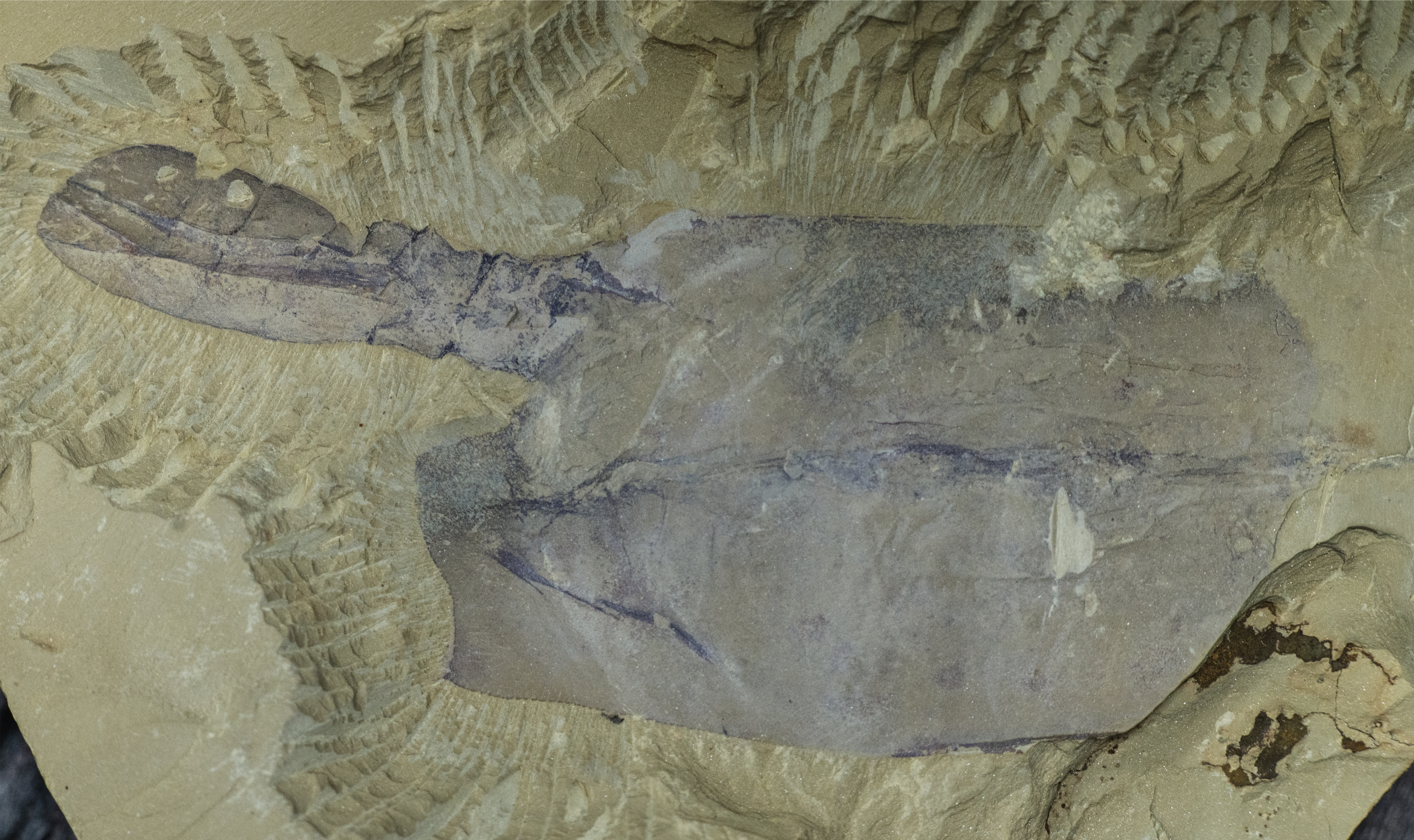
- Fossil of Vetulicola cuneata

Scientific classification
- Kingdom: Animalia
- Phylum: Chordata
- Clade?: †Vetulicolia
- Class: †Vetulicolida
- Order: †Vetulicolata
- Family: †Vetulicolidae
- Genus: †Vetulicola; Hou, 1987

Type species
- Vetulicola cuneata Hou, 1987

Species
- V. cuneata Hou, 1987; V. rectangulata Luo & Hou, 1999; V. gantoucunensis Luo et al., 2005; V. monile Aldridge, et al. 2007; V. longbaoshanensis Yang et al. 2010

= Vetulicola =

Vetulicola Temporal range: Cambrian Stage 3

Fossil genus of marine animal

Vetulicola is an extinct genus of marine animal discovered from the Cambrian of China. It is the eponymous member of the enigmatic taxon Vetulicolia, which is of uncertain affinities but may belong to the deuterostomes. The name was derived from Vetulicola cuneata, the first species described by Hou Xian-guang in 1987 from the Lower Cambrian Chiungchussu Formation in Chengjiang, China.

== Etymology ==
Vetulicola is a compound Latin word composed of vetulus, meaning "old," or "ancient," and -cola, meaning "inhabitant."

== Description ==
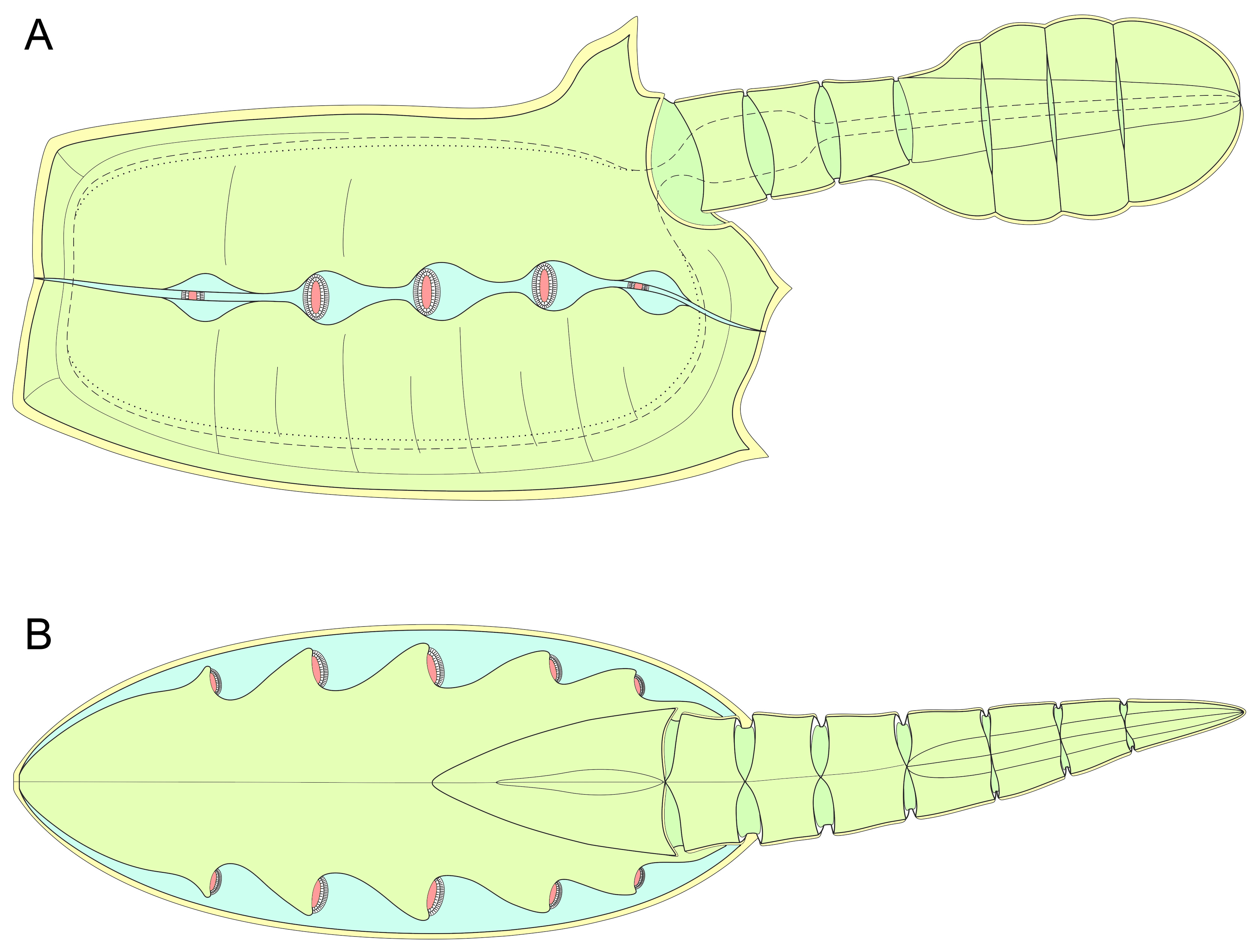
Schematic of V. rectangulata pharynx and alimentary canal: dashed line; dorsal and ventral food grooves: dotted line; gill slits: pink

The type species, Vetulicola cuneata, as originally described by Hou Xian-guang in 1987, has a body plan similar to those of arthropods and composed of two distinct parts of approximately equal length. The anterior part is rectangular with a carapace-like structure of four rigid cuticular plates, with a large mouth at the front end. The posterior section is slender, strongly cuticularised and placed dorsally. Paired openings connecting the pharynx to the outside run down the sides. These features are interpreted as possible primitive gill slits. Vetulicola cuneata could be up to 9 cm long. The Vetulicola are thought to have been swimmers that were possible filter feeders.

Other Vetulicola species described are Vetulicola rectangulata (Luo and Hu, 1999), V. gantoucunensis (Luo et al., 2005), V. monile (Aldridge et al., 2007), and V. longbaoshanensis (Yang et al., 2010). The mouth openings of all the other species are smaller, and do not protrude as in V. cuneata. All other species, with the stark exception of V. gantoucunensis, are smaller than the type species.

== Taxonomy ==
Vetulicola is the namesake genus of the family Vetulicolidae, which also includes Ooedigera and Beidazoon.

The family has been recovered as a monophyletic clade even in a 2024 analysis that yielded a paraphyletic Vetulicolia and Vetulicolida, although that same analysis found that the sole species of Beidazoon, B. venustrum, is more closely related to V. monile than V. monile is to other members of Vetulicola:

- Vetulicolidae†
  - Ooedigera†
  - - Vetulicola cuneata†
    - Vetulicola gantoucunensis†
    - Vetulicola longbaoshanensis†
    - Vetulicola rectangulata†
    - - Vetulicola monile†
      - Beidazoon†

An earlier study in 2014 treated Vetulicola as monophyletic, but was unable to resolve any relationships among vetulicolians as a group:

- Vetulicolia†
  - Vetulicola†
  - Beidazoon†
  - Ooedigera†
  - Pomatrum† / Xidazoon†
  - Didazoon†
  - Yuyuanozoon†
  - Banffia†
  - Heteromorphus†
  - Nesonektris†

== Paleobiology ==
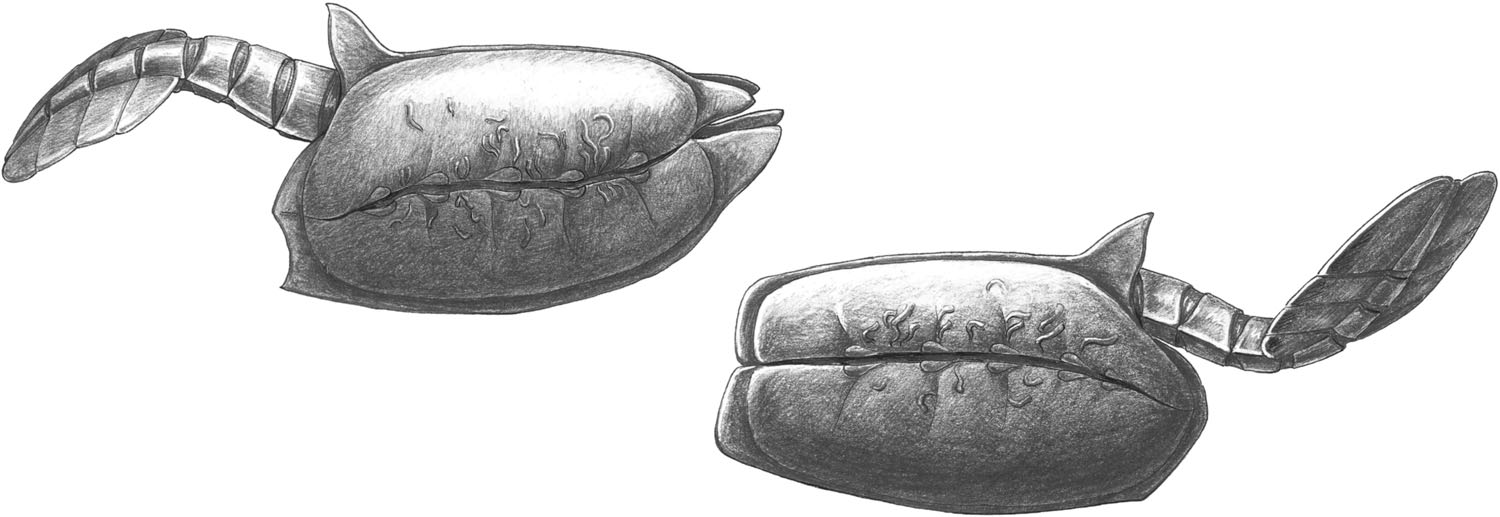
Reconstruction of V. cuneata and V. rectangulata, infested by Vermilituus gregarius

Vetulicola was the host of the symbiotic organism Vermilituus gregarius, which appears to have lived inside Vetulicola's anterior body. Only around 2% of Vetulicola individuals had Vermilituus infestations, but Vermilituus could be very numerous: one Vetulicola specimen had 88 individuals of Vermilituus infesting it. Such large numbers of symbiotic organisms were probably harmful to the host Vetulicola.
