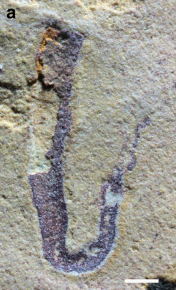
- YKLP 13079a, the holotype

Scientific classification
- Kingdom: Animalia
- Clade: Nephrozoa
- Clade: Protostomia
- Genus: †Vermilituus; Li et al., 2020
- Species: †V. gregarius

Binomial name
- †Vermilituus gregarius Li et al., 2020

= Vermilituus gregarius =

Vermilituus gregarius Temporal range: Cambrian Stage 3

Species of protostome animal

Vermilituus gregarius is a species of enigmatic, worm-like animal from the Cambrian Period of China. It appears to have been a symbiont, and possibly a parasite, of the genus Vetulicola. Vermilituus is superficially similar to tube worms, but the phylogenentic placement of the species is uncertain. V. gregarius is the only species assigned to the genus.

The species appears to have been gregarious, with as many as 88 individuals being found on specimens of Vetulicola in concentrated aggregates of up to 29 individuals. Size variations of V. gregarius on individual vetulicolians suggest that larvae landed on a host organism over an extended period of time. The locations of these aggregations of V. gregarius reveal insights into the soft tissue anatomy of vetulicolians, which is otherwise enigmatic.

== Etymology ==
The generic name is a compound word derived from the Latin vermis, meaning "worm," and lituus, a J-shaped instrument resembling the shape of the animal. The specific name gregarius refers to the tendency of this animal to be found in clusters of individuals.
