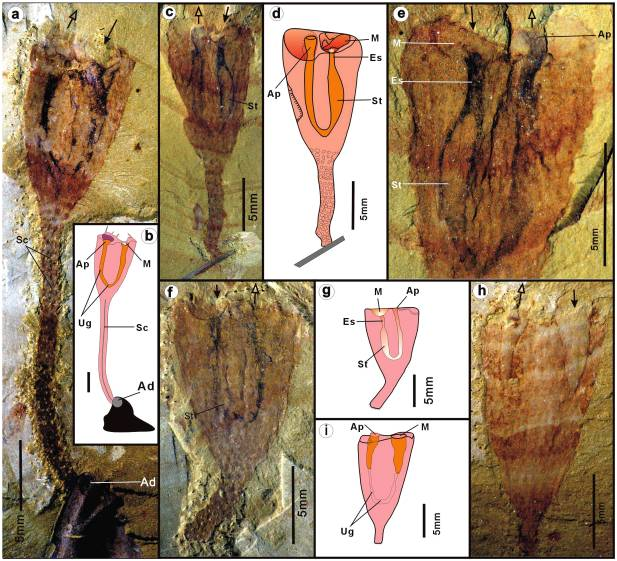
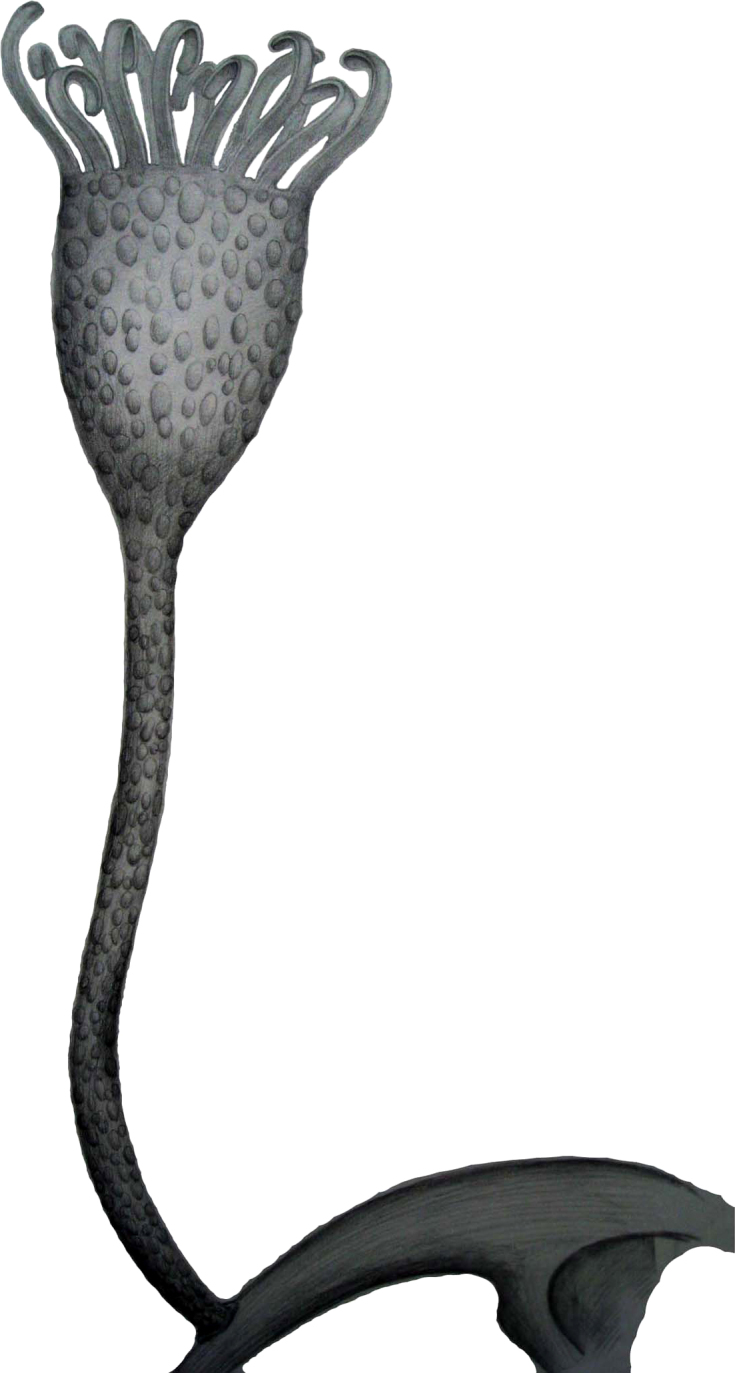
- Fossils and life position reconstruction of Cotyledion tylodes

Scientific classification
- Kingdom: Animalia
- Stem group: Entoprocta
- Genus: †Cotyledion; Luo and Hu in Luo et al., 1999
- Species: †C. tylodes

Binomial name
- †Cotyledion tylodes Luo and Hu in Luo et al., 1999

Synonyms
- ? Cambrotentacus sanwuia Zhang and Shu in Zhang et al., 2001

= Cotyledion =

Cotyledion Temporal range: Cambrian Stage 3

Extinct genus of filter-feeders

Cotyledion tylodes is an extinct, stalked filter-feeder known from the Chengjiang lagerstatten. The living animal reached a couple of centimetres in height, and bore a loose scleritome of ovoid sclerites. Its interpretation has been controversial, but it is currently thought to be a member of the Entoprocta stem group.

== History of identification ==
C. tylodes was initially tentatively classified as a stem group echinoderm in 1996, and then a lophophorate in 2002. Lophphorate affinities were challenged as based on taphonomic artifacts in a 2010 paper that suggested a cnidarian affinity based on cylyndrical symmetry as an ancestral body plan for that group.

A more recent alternative proposal suggested a relationship with the Cambroernida, a group of early deuterostomes. However, a later comprehensive paper on cambroernids did not include Cotyledion.

A comprehensive 2013 study of around 400 new specimens provided stronger support for a lophophorate affinity, specifically allied with the entoprocts. The clear presence of a U-shaped gut in the new specimens contradicts placement among the cnidarians, while the lack of bifurcation in the crown of tentacles makes affinity with the deuterostomes unlikely. A recent review of echinoderm origins again refuted the placement of Cotyledion with that group, agreeing with its identity as a stem entoproct.

== See also ==
- Dinomischus
- Siphusauctum
