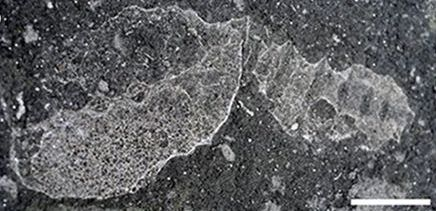
- Type specimen
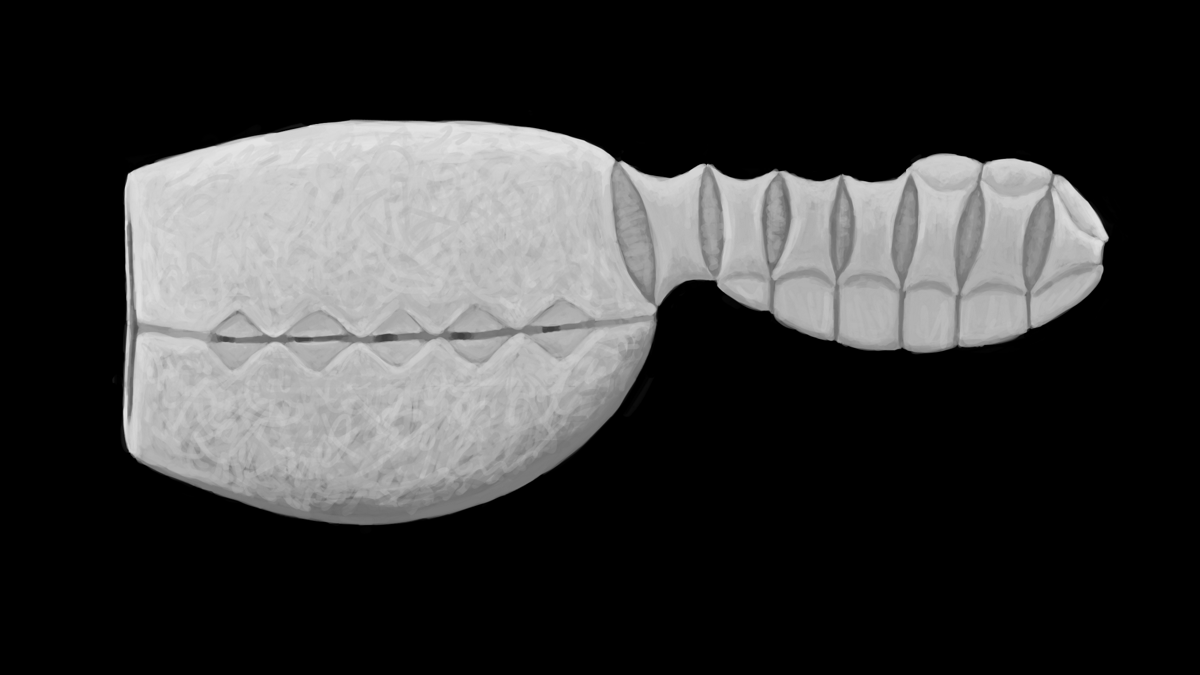
- Artist's restoration

Scientific classification
- Kingdom: Animalia
- Phylum: Chordata
- Clade?: †Vetulicolia
- Class: †Vetulicolida
- Order: †Vetulicolata
- Family: †Vetulicolidae
- Genus: †Ooedigera
- Species: †O. peeli

Binomial name
- †Ooedigera peeli Vinther et al. 2011

= Ooedigera =

Ooedigera Temporal range: Cambrian Stage 3, 519–516.5 Ma

Ovoid Cambrian animal with a bulbous tail

Ooedigera peeli is an extinct vetulicolian from the Early Cambrian of North Greenland. The front body was flattened horizontally, oval-shaped, likely bearing a reticulated or anastomosing pattern, and had 5 evenly-spaced gill pouches along the midline. The tail was also bulbous and flattened horizontally, but was divided into 7 plates connected by flexible membranes, allowing movement. Ooedigera likely swam by moving side-to-side like a fish. It may have lived in an oxygen minimum zone alongside several predators in an ecosystem based on chemosynthetic microbial mats, and was possibly a deposit or filter feeder living near the seafloor.

== Etymology ==
The genus name Ooedigera derives from Ancient Greek ooedis "egg-shaped/oval" and geros "old". The species name peeli is in honour of Professor John S. Peel from the Geological Survey of Greenland, who especially researched the locality Ooedigera was discovered in.

== Taxonomy ==
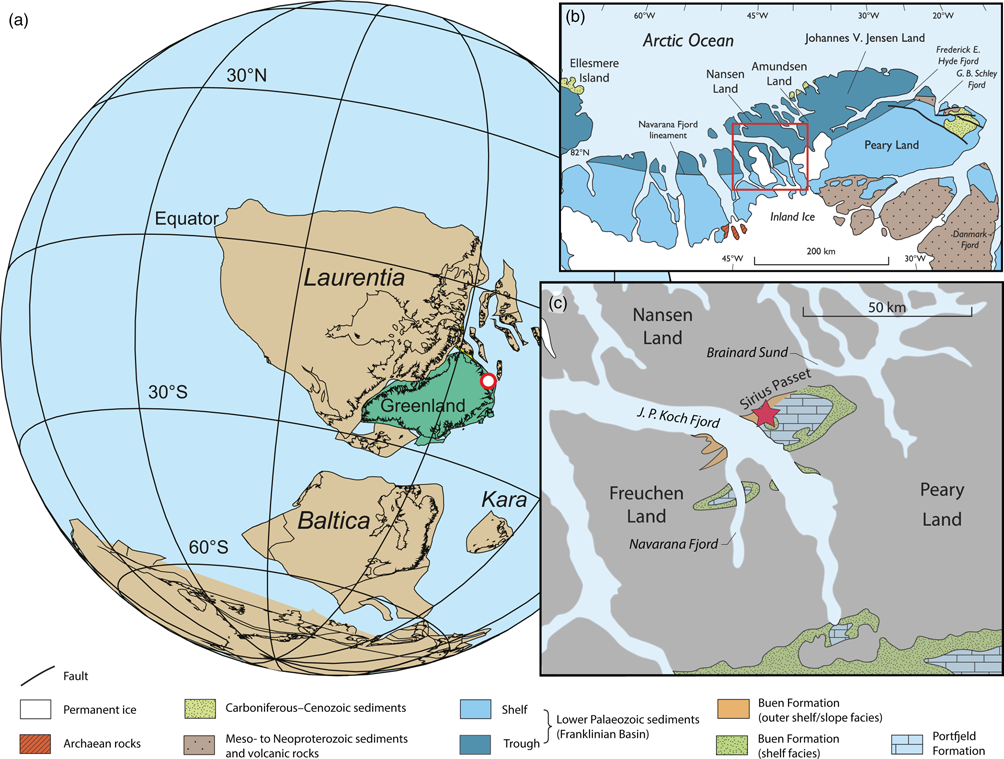
Sirius Passet in the Early Cambrian

The type specimen MGUH 29279 was discovered in the Early Cambrian Sirius Passet Lagerstätte of the North Greenlandic Buen Formation. The area corresponds to the early Cambrian Stage 3 about 519–516.5 million years ago. The specimen is a flat compression fossil preserved in fissile mudstone, with an odd, thin lamination, and several small splotches which represent the remains of various other creatures, such as sponges and trilobites.

Ooedigera is classified in the extinct Cambrian subphylum Vetulicolia in the family Vetulicolidae along with Vetulicola. Ooedigera is the third vetulicolid found outside the Chinese Maotianshan Shales (the others are an undescribed specimen from Mural Formation, Canada and Nesonektris from Emu Bay Shale, Australia). The taxonomic position of Vetulicolia continues to be debated, but recent theories place it among the Chordata, either as the most basal portion of the stem group, or close to the Tunicata.

== Anatomy ==
The type specimen is 41.3 mm (1.63 in) long in total, and the body plan is divided into an ovoid front body and a segmented tail. The type specimen seems to have been compressed on its side during fossilization, and due to the irregular folding of the outline, the skin may have been softer than in other vetulicolians.

The front body was oval-shaped, measuring 22.5 mm (0.9 in) in length and 14 mm (0.55 in) in height, and flattened horizontally. It had a straight front edge, and the back edge came to a point, intersecting at the midline of the front body. Unlike Chinese vetulicolians, the type specimen shows no indication of a ridge running along the midline, and a lack of such in Ooedigera would be significant in terms of its taxonomy, but more specimens are required to confirm this. Like other vetulicolians, the midline had 5 more or less evenly spaced openings, 3.3 mm (0.13 in) from the front edge and 2.4 mm (0.094 in) from the back edge, corresponding to gill pouches. The front body seems to have had a reticulated or anastomosing pattern. Such ornamentation is also seen Beidazoon, which is of similar size to juvenile specimens of Vetulicola; no ornamented forms of size similar to other adult vetulicolians had been found prior to Ooedigera.

Like other vetulicolians, the tail was asymmetrical, flattened horizontally, and divided into 7 segments which were connected by flexible membranes, the latter allowing movement. It is 18.8 mm (0.74 in) long and 8.7 mm (0.34 in) high. Each segment had concave edges, which gave each one an hourglass shape in side-view. Segments 2–7 were flat on the underside, and segments 5–7 were also flat on the top. The last segment was shorter than in other vetulicolians. Given the asymmetrical flattening, the tail likely propelled by flexing side-to-side like a fish rather than up-and-down.

== Palaeocology ==
It is largely unknown what vetulicolians fed upon. Lacking mouths adapted for chewing or grasping, they were probably not predators or scavengers. Lacking limbs, it is unlikely they were burrowers or lived on the seafloor, rather inhabiting the water column (nektonic) but perhaps staying near the seafloor (nektobenthic). They may have been passive floaters, but it is possible that the gills were used for jet propulsion like thaliaceans. The gills may have also been used in filter feeding, actively swallowing and expelling water using the mouth and gills respectively. However, Vetulicola, Banffia, and Pomatrum have remains of sediments in the gut, which is either evidence of deposit feeding on the seafloor or a result of fossilization. It is possible vetulicolians used both feeding methods like the modern acorn worm Balanoglossus.

About 45 species have been discovered in Sirius Passet, mostly endemic fauna, including trilobites, sponges, worms, and the extinct halkieriids and lobopodians. Another indeterminate vetulicolian was found here. The area may have been an oxygen minimum zone, and, like the preceding Ediacaran, the ecosystem may have been primarily based on chemosynthetic microbial mats which fed grazers and filter feeders. Arthropods and sponges are the most common fossils, and members of the former and lobopodians may have been major predators. Predators appear to have been the most common animals.
