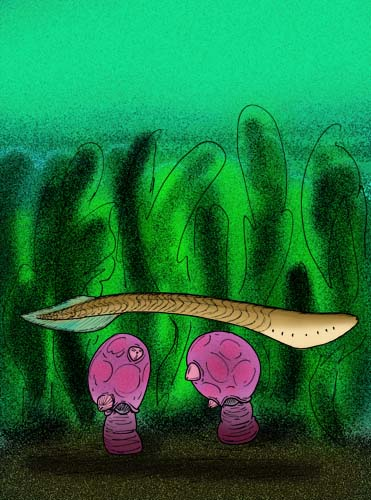
- C. diadexus (top) and Vetulocystis (bottom)

Scientific classification
- Kingdom: Animalia
- Phylum: Chordata
- Genus: †Cathaymyrus; Shu, Conway Morris & Zhang 1996

Type species
- Cathaymyrus diadexus Shu, Conway Morris & Zhang 1996

Species
- †C. diadexus Shu, Conway Morris & Zhang 1996; †C. haikoensis Luo, Hu & Chen 2001

= Cathaymyrus =

Cathaymyrus Temporal range: Cambrian Stage 3, 518 Ma

Extinct genus of chordates

Cathaymyrus is a genus of Early Cambrian chordate known from the Chengjiang biota in Yunnan Province, China. Both species have a long segmented body with no distinctive head. The segments resemble v-shaped muscle blocks found in cephalochordates such as Amphioxus. A long linear impression runs along the "back" of the body looking something like a chordate notochord.

While some authors have suggested that the genus is a cephalochordate and closely related to living lancelets, other authors have disputed this due to the poor preservation of the head region, considering its placement within Chordata uncertain.

== See also ==
- Maotianshan shales
- Haikouichthys
- Myllokunmingia
