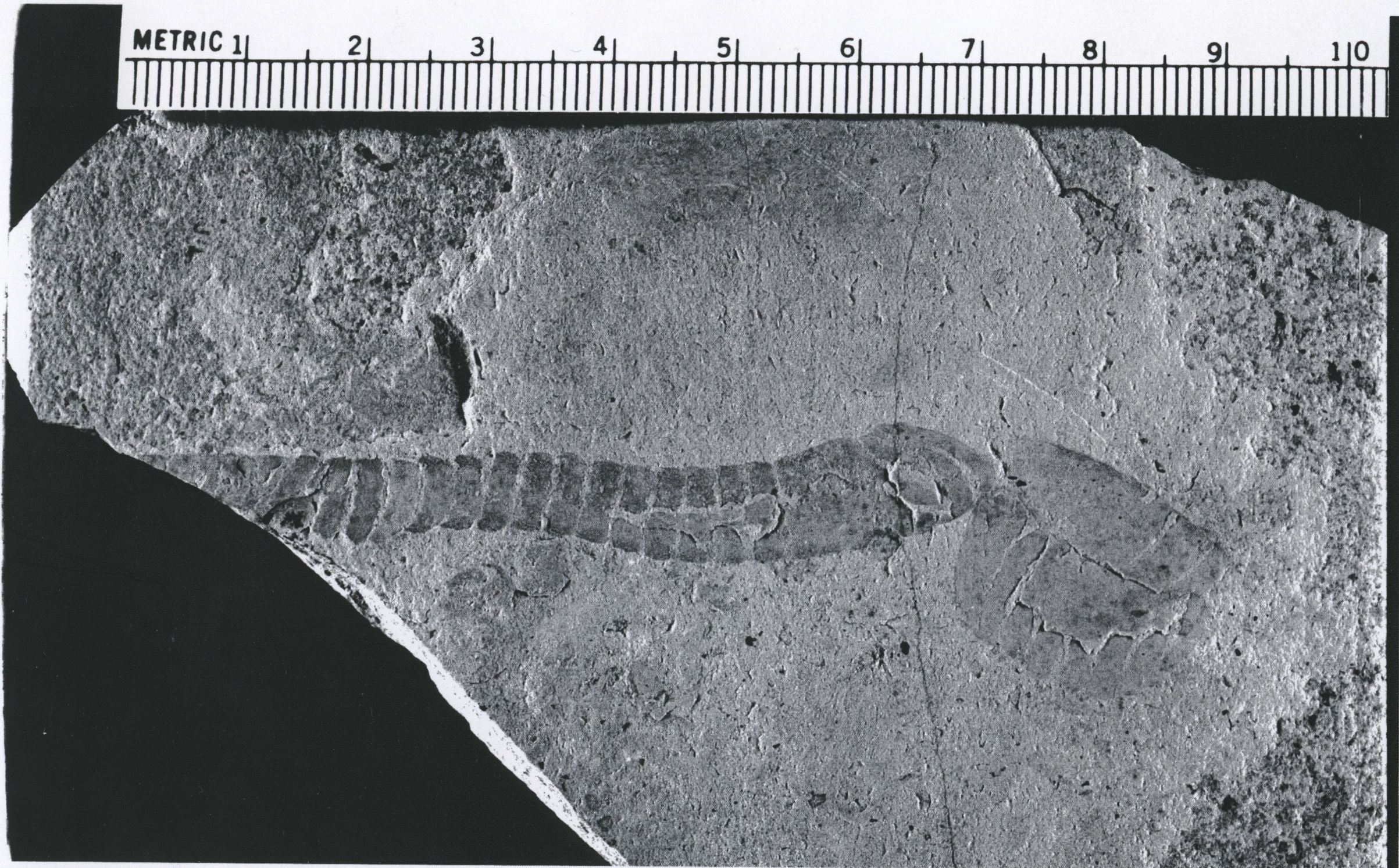
- Holotype specimen
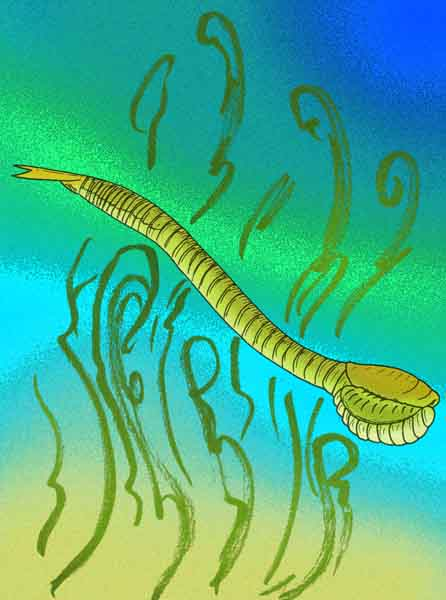
- Life restoration

Scientific classification
- Kingdom: Animalia
- Phylum: Chordata
- Clade?: †Vetulicolia
- Class: †Banffozoa
- Order: †Banffiata
- Family: †Banffiidae (?)
- Genus: †Skeemella; Briggs et al., 2005
- Species: †S. clavula

Binomial name
- †Skeemella clavula Briggs et al., 2005

= Skeemella =

Skeemella Temporal range: 513–501 Ma Middle Cambrian

Extinct genus of bilaterians

Skeemella is a genus of elongate animal from the Middle Cambrian Wheeler Shale and Marjum lagerstätte of Utah. It has been classified with the banffozoan vetulicolians.

== Description ==
Skeemella, which was first described in 2005, is diagnosed as having a body in two sections, covered in cuticle. The anterior section is short and wide, has a straight dorsal margin and a curving ventral margin, and is divided longitudinally in a way that makes it resemble a head shield. The anterior region is interpreted as being made of nine segments separated by thinner membranes (rather than as a single unit with multiple openings). Skeemella has a narrow, worm-shaped rear section with 43 segments in holotype specimen, identified as tergites separated by flexible membranes. The rear section terminates in what appears to be an arthropod telson, an elongate, unsegmented flattened structure that ends in two backward-pointing spines.

In 2020, two more specimens of S. clavula were found in Drumian sediments of 'Middle' Marjum Formation, Ptychagnostus punctuosus Biozone. They are less well preserved than the holotype but one of them apparently has the outer part of the cuticle preserved, whereas the holotype has the inner part. The Marjum specimen has individual posterior body segments that are shorter and wider than those of the holotype. This most likely illustrates individual rather than interspecies differences.

== Taxonomy ==
Skeemella shows typical vetulicolian features, such as a body divided into two distinct parts: a wider torpedo-shaped front end and a segmented rear section interpreted as the muscular driver for an active swimming lifestyle. Vetulicolians were originally described as relatives of arthropods, but their classification is debated; the discovery of new genera with a row of front-section openings interpreted as gill slits has shifted their interpretation to stem-group deuterostomes or chordates, or perhaps even crown-group chordates related to tunicates.

Newer reconstructions of vetulicolians often resemble tunicate larvae or simple cephalochordates, with the front section as a pharynx used for breathing and ramjet style filter-feeding and the rear section as muscle blocks. However, Skeemella is an unlikely candidate for this interpretation; the rear section segments bear clear affinities to arthropods. Either Skeemella is not a vetulicolian, researchers do not yet have enough data to correctly interpret Skeemella, or vetulicolians are not deuterostomes.

Skeemella is one of a number of unrelated "platypus problems"; early lagerstätten fossils that have seemed to mix features of chordates and arthropods, two animal clades considered very distant from each other. Additional evidence will need to be discovered to fully resolve the relationships.
