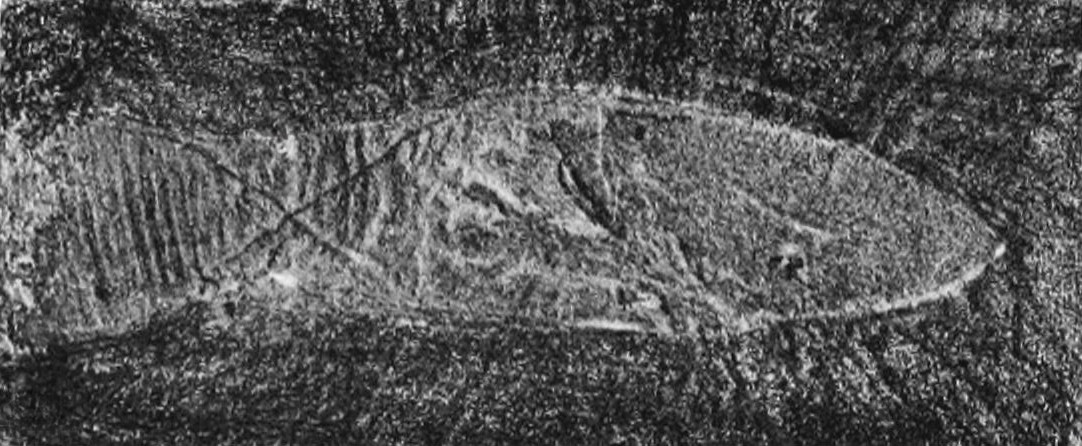
- Fossil of B. constricta from the Burgess Shale
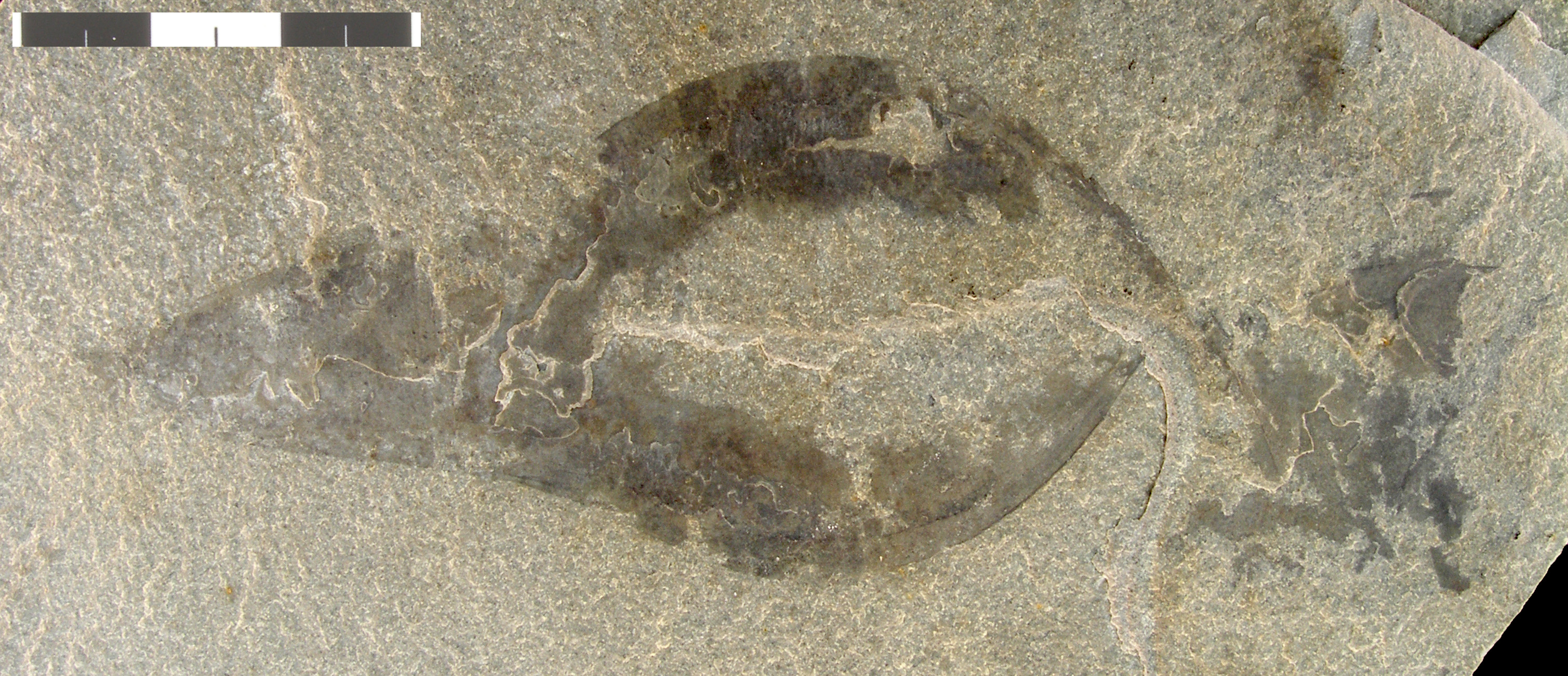
- Fossil of B. episoma from the Spence Shale

Scientific classification
- Kingdom: Animalia
- Phylum: Chordata
- Clade?: †Vetulicolia
- Class: †Banffozoa
- Order: †Banffiata
- Family: †Banffiidae
- Genus: †Banffia; Walcott, 1911

Type species
- †Banffia constricta Walcott, 1911

Species
- †Banffia constricta Walcott, 1911; †Banffia episoma Conway Morris and Selden, 2015

= Banffia =

Banffia Temporal range: 520–501 Ma Middle Cambrian

Extinct genus of Cambrian organisms

Banffia is a genus of animals described from Middle Cambrian fossils. The genus commemorates Banff, Alberta, near where the first fossil specimens were discovered. Its placement in higher taxa is controversial, with it mostly being considered to be a member of the enigmatic phylum Vetulicolia.

== Anatomy ==
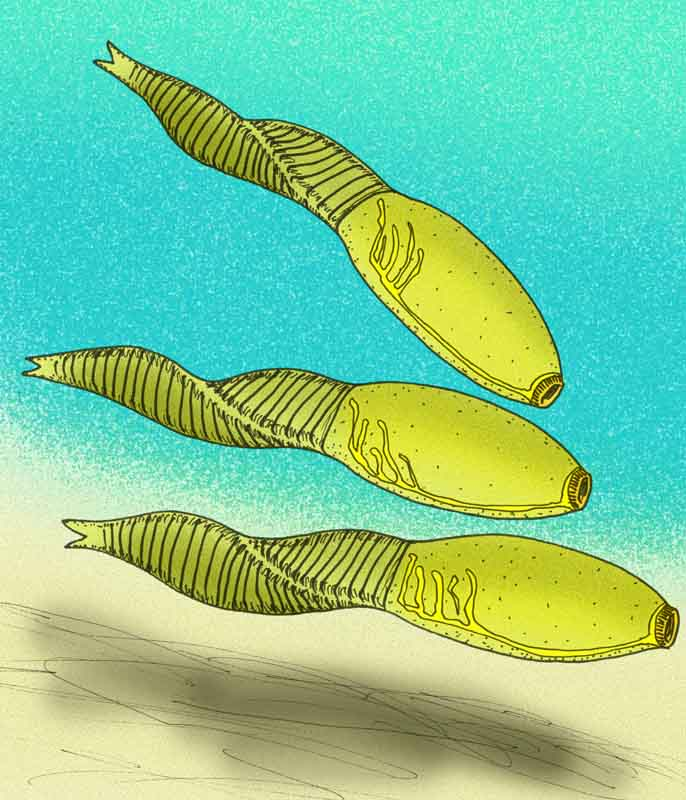
Life restoration of three B. constricta

Banffia constricta is known from hundreds of fossils found in the Burgess Shales. It is up to 10 cm in length, and divided equally into anterior and posterior parts. The entire body is twisted in a clockwise spiral, as seen from the front. This is believed to be a secondary adaptation from an initial bilateral condition for a burrowing lifestyle. The anterior section is covered by two carapace-like un-mineralized shells that are fused together. A crown-like structure formed of three concentric circular features surrounds the mouth. An antenna-form structure just posterior to the mouth may be a sensory organ. The posterior section is composed of 40 to 50 segments. The gut is straight, and the anus is at the terminal tip of the posterior section. The gut appears to have a series of diverticula or pouches. A possible circulatory system is visible in the fossils. B. constricta and its relative Skeemella were probably filter or deposit feeders.

== Classification ==
There is no agreement on the classification of Banffia. B. constricta was assigned to the annelids by Walcott in 1911. As of 2006, different proposals would place Banffia in Vetulicolia, Arthropoda, or Urochordata. While the body plan (equal anterior and posterior sections with segmentation) resembles that of the Vetulicolians, it is argued that the absence of gills and an endostyle, and the presence of gut diverticula makes Banffia unlikely to be a member of the deuterostomes. However, an apparent complete lack of appendages (aside from the antenna-like structures) makes B. constricta's placement within Arthropoda equally unlikely. More recent finds of similarly shaped animals show structures thought to be a notochord, making Banffia and their relatives chordates, possibly the sister group to tunicates.

The species Banffia confusa, known from fossils from the Chengjiang shales, was originally assigned to this genus, though, recent research shows that this species is not closely related to B. constricta, having been renamed as its junior synonym, Heteromorphus longicaudatus, and placed in a different class altogether, "Heteromorphida." Later, Aldridge, et al. resurrected B. confusa as Heteromorphus confusus, noting a variety of anatomical differences among the various specimens of Heteromorphus, suggesting that there may be more species recognized with more fossils discovered.
