= Cambrian chordates =

Extinct group of animals that lived between 485 and 538 million years ago

Size comparison of various Cambrian chordates to a human hand

The Cambrian chordates are an extinct group of animals belonging to the phylum Chordata that lived during the Cambrian, between 538 and 485 million years ago. The first Cambrian chordate discovered is Pikaia gracilens, a lancelet-like animal from the Burgess Shale in British Columbia, Canada. The discoverer, Charles Doolittle Walcott, described it as a kind of worm (annelid) in 1911, but it was later identified as a chordate. Subsequent discoveries of other Cambrian fossils from the Burgess Shale in 1991, and from the Chengjiang biota of China in 1991, which were later found to be of chordates, several Cambrian chordates are known, with some fossils considered as putative chordates.

The Cambrian chordates are characterised by the presence of segmented muscle blocks called myomeres and notochord, the two defining features of chordates. Before the full understanding of Cambrian fossils, chordates as members of "the most advanced phylum" were believed to have appeared on Earth much later than the Cambrian. However, the better picture of Cambrian explosion in the light of Cambrian chordates, according to Stephen Jay Gould, prompted "revised views of evolution, ecology and development," and remarked: "So much for chordate uniqueness marked by slightly later evolution."

== Discovery ==
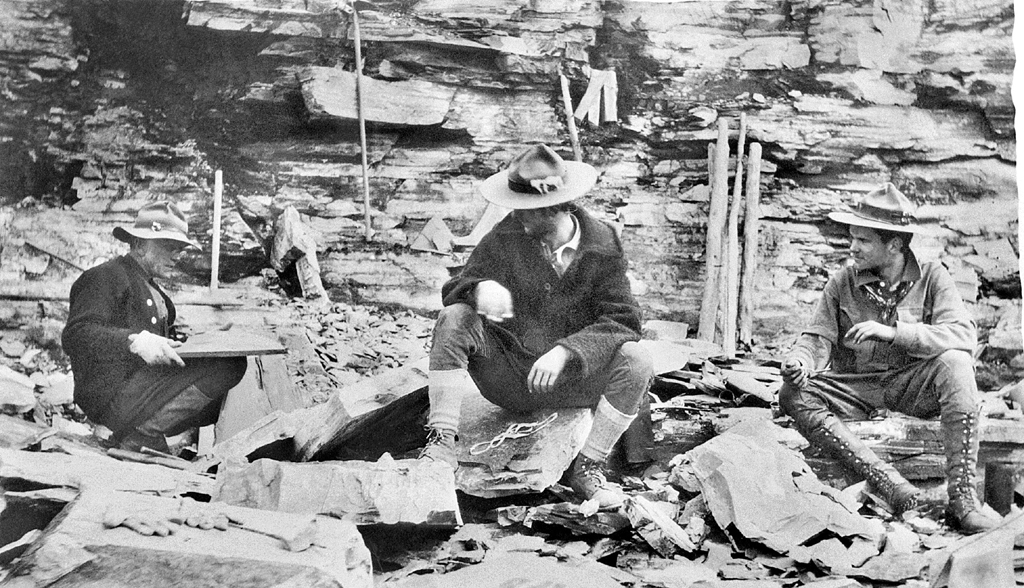
Charles Doolittle Walcott (left) at a fossil quarry excavating the Burgess Shale in British Columbia, Canada.

Pikaia gracilens was the first Cambrian chordate known. It was discovered by Charles Doolittle Walcott from the Burgess Shale in the mountains of British Columbia, Canada. Walcott reported the specimen with taxonomic description in 1911. He used the series of transverse body segments as a feature of annelid worms and classified it as a polychaete worm. He gave the name after Pika Peak, a mountain in Alberta, Canada. However, he was also aware of the unique differences from living worms that he prudently remarked: "I am unable to place it within any of the families of the Polychaeta, owing to the absence of parapodia [paired protrusions on the sides of polychaete worms] on the body segments back of the fifth."

University of Cambridge palaeontologist Harry B. Whittington and his student Simon Conway Morris re-analysed the specimens and came to an opinion in 1977 that Pikaia was obviously a chordate: the body segments were similar to muscle blocks in chordates, and a rod-like structure spans the body length, an indication of notochord, a defining structure of chordates. Their article in the Scientific American in 1979 affirmed the chordate status, saying: "The chordates are represented in the Burgess Shale by the genus Pikaia and the single species P. gracilens." Conway Morris published the formal classification as a chordate in 1979. Harvard University palaeontologist Stephen Jay Gould popularised Pikaia as an ancestral species of chordates in his 1989 book Wonderful Life: The Burgess Shale and the Nature of History, from which Pikaia became known as the "most famous early chordate fossil," or the earliest chordate, or the oldest ancestor of humans.

The second Burgess shale chordate was also discovered by Walcott but left unexamined. The date of discovery was not recorded. Italian palaeontologist Alberto M. Simonetta, while working at the US National Museum of Natural History, where Walcott's collections are maintained, became the first to analyse the specimen in 1960. He and Emilio Insom at the University of Camerino published the classification in 1993, giving the name Metaspriggina walcotti, an animal with unknown identity. Conway Morris recovered additional specimen with which he described the species as that of chordate in 2008.

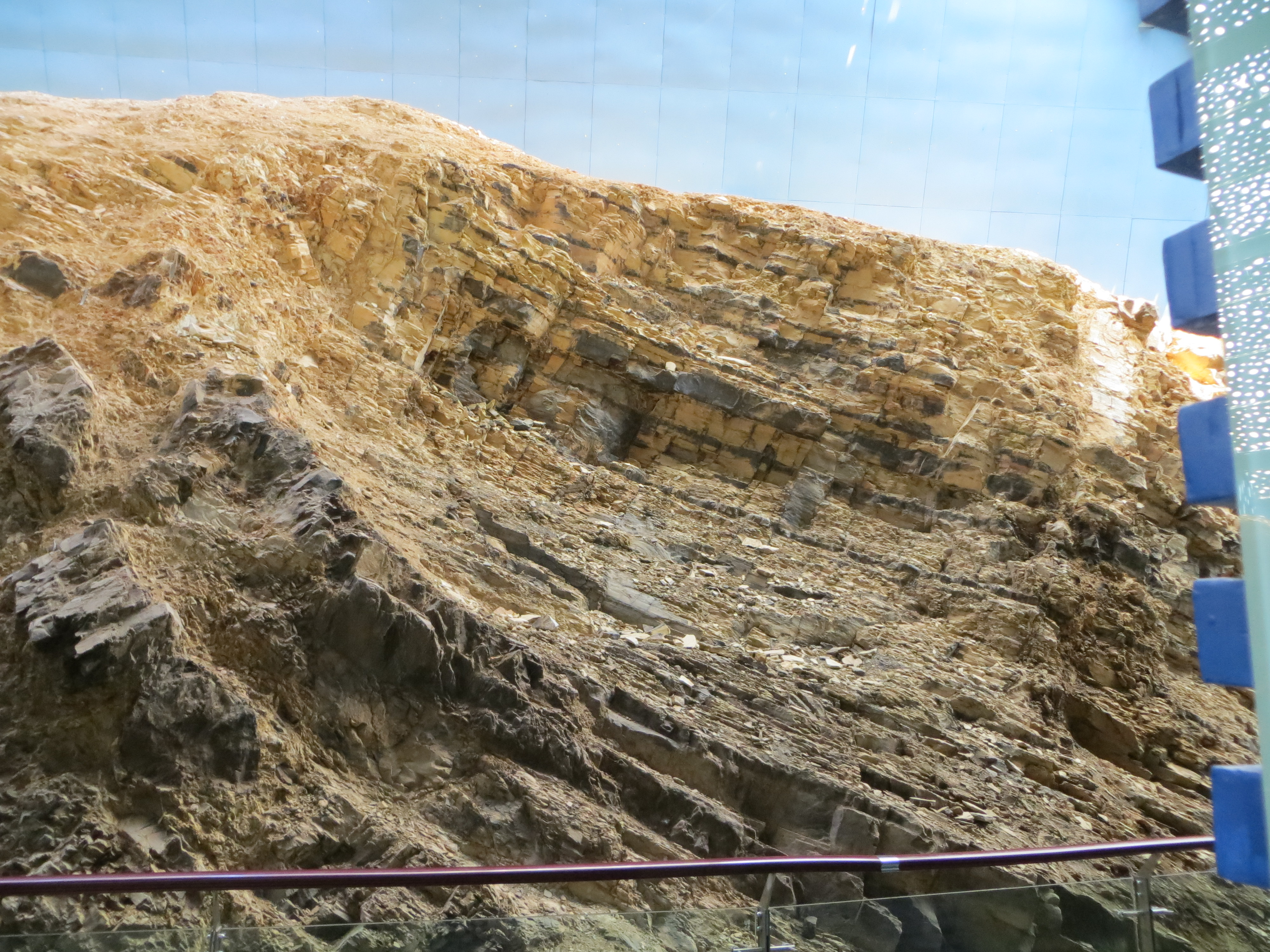
Maotianshan Shale, site of the discovery of the Chengjiang Biota, (UNESCO world heritage site)

In 1991, Hou Xian-guang (of the Chinese Academy of Sciences), Lars Ramsköld and Jan Bergström (of the Swedish Museum of Natural History) reported a series of discoveries of Cambrian fossils from the Maotianshan Shales in Chengjiang County, Yunnan Province, China. One specimen which they named Yunnanozoon lividum was a worm-like animal that could not be easily fit into any known type of animals. They remarked:

We are unaware of any described animal similar to Yunnanozoon gen. n., and are unable to refer it to a particular phylum. This is, however, no valid reason to regard it as presenting an unknown phylum. It may be noted that a thick cuticle with repetitive pattern is characteristic of some aschelminth groups, but of virtually no other extant animals apart from arthropods.

They speculated that the animal was most related to roundworms (aschelminthes). Four years later, Ramsköld and his team reanalysed the anatomical details and concluded that it was a chordate. The Maotianshan Shales have yielded other Cambrian chordates and chordate-related animals including Cathaymyrus species (C. diadexus and C. haikoensis), Haikouella species (H. lanceolata and H. jianshanensis, but possibly a type, synonym, of Yunnanozoon), Myllokunmingia fengjiaoa, Shankouclava anningense, Zhongjianichthys rostratus, Zhongxiniscus intermedius, and a group called vetulicolians of uncertain classification.

== Burgess Shale chordates ==
=== Pikaia gracilens ===
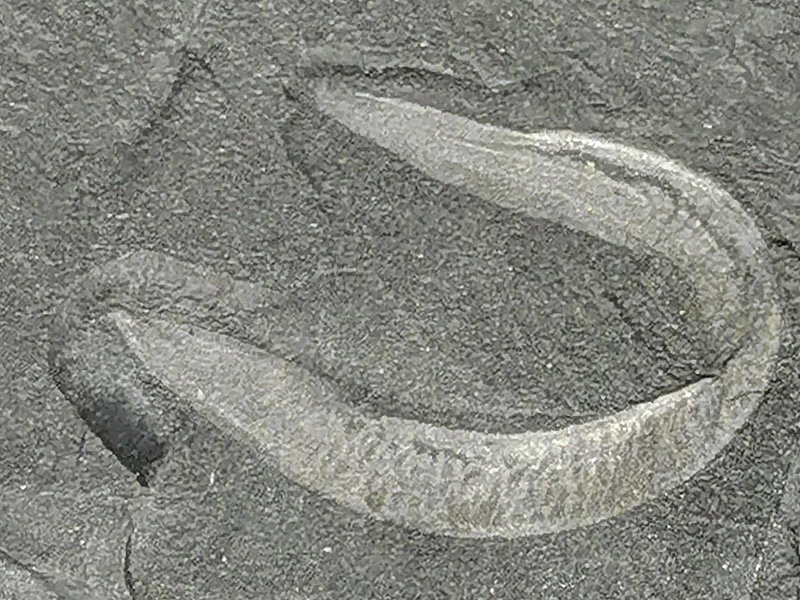
Pikaia fossil from the Royal Ontario Museum's collection.

Pikaia gracilens was a primitive chordate having a lancelet-like body that lacked a well-defined head components and averaged about 3.8 cm in length. On each side of its head is a pair of large, antenna-like tentacles similar to those of snails. There are a series of short appendages on either side of the underside of the head just after the mouth, and their exact nature or function is unknown. The pharynx is associated with six pairs of slits with tiny filaments that could be used for respiratory apparatus.

A hollow tubular structure running from its anterior part of the body to the tail was earlier believed to be an indication of the presence of a notochord, a defining feature of all chordates from protochordates to mammals. However, a reanalysis in 2012 indicated that the hollow tube is not the notochord and instead described it as a dorsal organ, purported to be a storage tube. The notochord was reinterpreted to run underneath the dorsal organ a thin rod-like filament. The body segments are anatomically blocks of skeletal muscles, called the myomeres, which are found in vertebrates only. No eyes can be observed.

The muscle orientation and flat shaped body indicate that Pikaia was an active and free swimmer. It would have swum by throwing its body into a series of S-shaped, zigzag curves, as do living eels. However, its myomere arrangement suggests that Pikaia could not be a fast swimmer.

=== Metaspriggina walcotti ===
Specimen of Metaspriggina

Metaspriggina walcotti is fish-like and measures up to 6 centimetres (2.4 in) in length and 1 centimetre (0.39 in) in breadth. It possesses a notochord along with seven pairs of pharyngeal bars, possibly made of cartilage. The pharyngeal bars were formed of multiple separate pairs of bones. The first two pairs are larger than the others and do not support any gills, a characteristic that suggests a distant relationship to gnathostomatans (jawed vertebrates from fish to humans). It lacked fins and it had a weakly developed cranium, but possessed two well-developed upward-facing eyes with nostrils behind them. Unlike in Pikaia in which myomeres are numerous and V-shaped, the myomeres have a W-shaped configuration and are 40 in number.

== Maotianshan Shale chordates ==
=== Yunnanozoon lividum ===
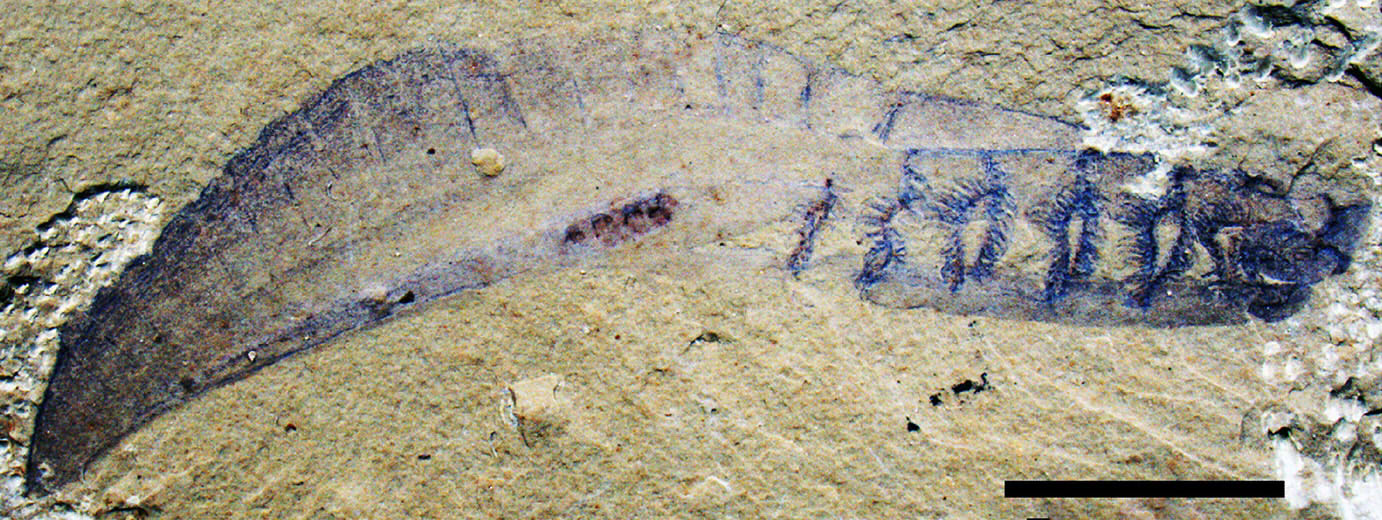
Yunnanozoon lividum fossil.

Yunnanozoon lividum is small, measuring 2.5 to 4 cm long. It is described as a deuterostome being either a hemichordate or chordate. An analysis in 2022 affirmed it to be one of the earliest members (basal) of the vertebrate family tree. It has a general appearance of that of Pikaia. There are no indications of structures such as a heart, gills, etc., which are seen in well-preserved specimens of Haikouella.

An analysis in 2015 concluded that Haikouella is a junior synonym of Yunnanozoon, and that its two species (H. lanceolata and H. jianshanensis) are members of the genus Yunnanozoon.

=== Myllokunmingia fengjiaoa ===
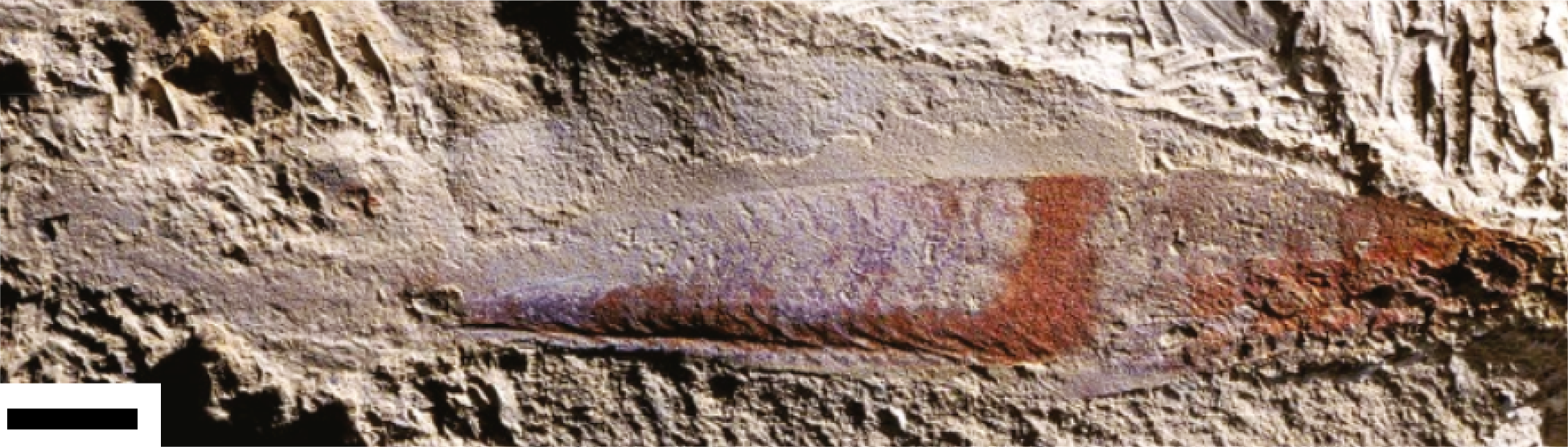
Myllokunmingia fossil.

Myllokunmingia fengjiaoa is 2.8 cm long and 0.6 cm high. It is among the oldest possible craniates. It appears to have a skull and skeletal structures made of cartilage. It has a distinct head and trunk with a forward sail-like dorsal fin and a ventral finfold. There are five or six gill pouches with hemibranchs on its head. 25 myomeres with rearward-facing chevrons are arranged on its trunk. It has a distinct notochord, a pharynx and a digestive tract that may run all the way to the rear tip of the animal. Mouth is not identified.

=== Zhongjianichthys rostratus ===
Zhongjianichthys rostratus is generally regarded as an early fish, and therefore as one of the first vertebrates. It has an eel-like body, 1.1 cm in length, and covered with a thick integument. It has no visible myomeres. Its ventral fin is low and runs much of the body's length. It has reduced fins that indicates that it was mainly bottom-dwelling and did not swim much.

=== Zhongxiniscus intermedius ===
Zhongxiniscus intermedius had a small, broad and short, fish-like body that was roughly 10 mm in length. It has S-shaped myomeres, dorsal and ventral fins. It is tentatively interpreted as an intermediate form between Cathaymyrus and two vertebrates Haikouichthys and Myllokunmingia.

=== Haikouichthys ercaicunensis ===
Haikouichthys ercaicunensis looks like Myllokunmingia with which it was discovered from the same beds. The body about 2.5 cm (1 in) long and is narrower than Myllokunmingia. The head and tail are distinct at the opposite ends. There are at least six to nine probable gills. The myomeres are with rear directed chevrons in the tail. It has a long notochord along its body length. It has a prominent dorsal fin with fin radials but not as well developed in those of hagfish and lampreys.

== Marjum Formation ==
=== Nuucichthys ===
Nuucichthys found in the Marjum Formation of the House Range in Utah, and is closely related Laurentian stem-vertebrates. Nuucichthys is 32.4 millimeters (1.28 inches) long and is 7.9 millimeters (0.31 inches) tall. The eyes have camera-type lenses. Nuucichthys have a large branchial chamber with organs.

== Phylogeny ==
Relationships of stem and early crown chordates after Mussini et al., 2024:

- Chordata (total group)
  - Banffia†
  - Heteromorphus†
  - - Skeemella†
    - - Nesonektris†
      - - Vetulicolidae†
        - - Didazoon†
          - Pomatrum†
          - Yuyuanozoon†
          - - Yunnanozoon†
            - - Cathaymyrus†
              - Pikaia†
              - Chordata (crown group)
                - Cephalochordata
                - - Tunicata
                  - - Metaspriggina†
                    - - Myllokunmingia†
                      - Vertebrata
