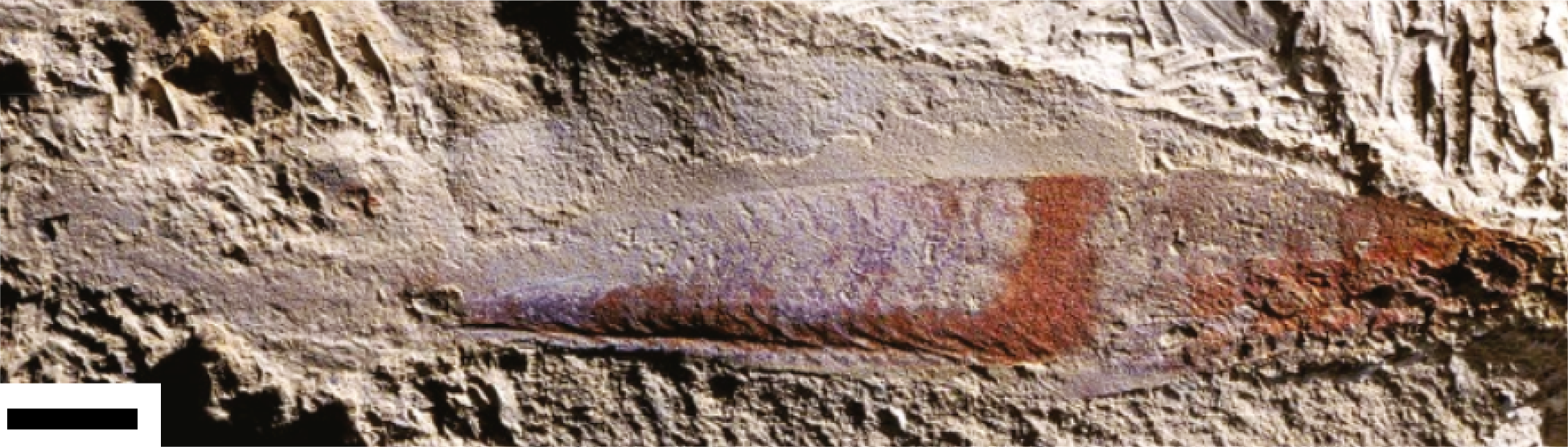
- Specimen RCCBYU-10200a, which has been interpreted as either Haikouichthys or Myllokunmingia
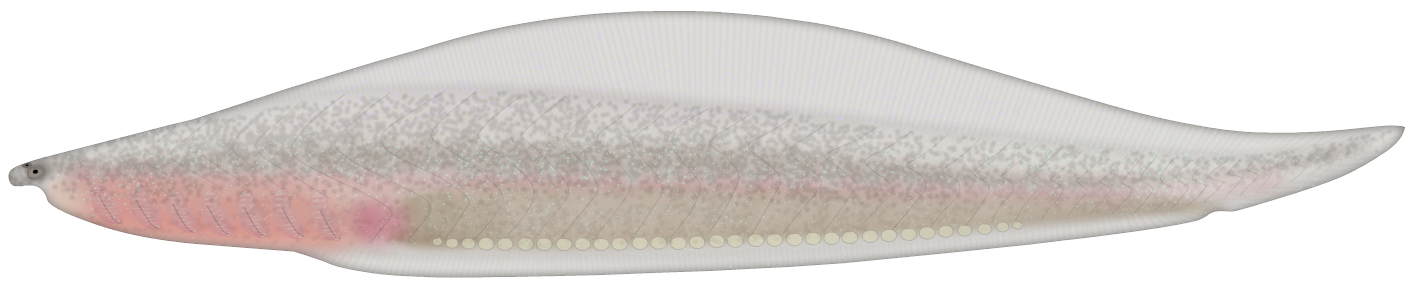
- Reconstruction of Haikouichthys

Scientific classification
- Kingdom: Animalia
- Phylum: Chordata
- Infraphylum: Agnatha
- Order: †Myllokunmingiida; Shu, 2003
- Family: †Myllokunmingiidae; Shu, 2003

Genera
- †Haikouichthys; †Myllokunmingia; †Zhongjianichthys

= Myllokunmingiidae =

Myllokunmingiidae Temporal range: Cambrian Stage 3, 518 Ma

Extinct family of jawless fishes

Myllokunmingiidae is a family of fish-like, stem-vertebrate chordate animals which lived during the Cambrian period. The myllokunmingiids are considered to be the earliest known members of the vertebrate lineage. The group contains only three known genera, Haikouichthys, Myllokunmingia, and Zhongjianichthys, whose fossils have all been found in the Maotianshan Shales lagerstätte.

== Description ==
Size of Myllokunmingia (light green) and Haikouichthys (orange) compared to other Cambrian chordates, and an anatomical diagram of a myllokunmingiid

Myllokunmingiids were relatively small, with Myllokunmingia having a body length of about 2.8 centimetres (1.1 in) and a body height of around 6 millimetres (1/4 in) excluding the fins. Their anatomy features a notochord with vertebral elements, cranial elements, gill arches and filaments, fins with radials, zigzag-shaped muscle segments (myomeres) and paired sense organs on the head. These sense organs include a pair of otic capsules and two pairs of camera-type eyes: one large lateral set and another smaller medial (closer to the midline of the head) set, which were formerly interpreted as nasal sacs. This was indicated after a study of six specimens of Haikouichthys and four specimens of indeterminate myllokunmingiids in 2026 by Lei and colleagues, who link the two smaller medial eyes to the pineal/parapineal system in crown-group vertebrates.

== Taxonomy ==
The validity of the three known taxa is generally accepted. Even so, there has been some debate on whether they are truly distinct.

Hou and colleages have argued in 2002 that Haikouicthys is synonymous with Myllokunmingia. Subsequent studies led by the British paleontologist Simon Conway Morris in 2006 and 2012 identified the genera to be distinct on the basis of their gill arrangements, the absence of branchial rays in Myllokunmingia and the myomeres having a more acute shape in Haikouichthys. However, in 2012, Conway Morris and Caron raise the possibility of Zhongjianichthys being synonymous with Haikouichthys on the basis of their lack of visible myomeres being a taphonomic artifact (i.e., related to decay prior to fossilization). Similarly, in 2017, Hou et al. suggest in their book, The Cambrian Fossils of Chengjiang, China, that myllokunmingiid specimens referred to all three taxa are taphonomic variants and on the basis of the lack of certainty in the reliability of the distinguishing characters between the three taxa, they prefer to use the name Myllokunmingia for all of them in concurrence with Hou et al., 2002.

- Order †Myllokunmingiida Shu, 2003
  - Family †Myllokunmingiidae Shu, 2003
    - Genus †Haikouichthys Luo, Hu & Shu 1999 sensu Shu et al., 2003
      - Species †Haikouichthys ercaicunensis Luo, Hu & Shu 1999 sensu Shu et al., 2003
    - Genus †Myllokunmingia Shu, Zhang & Han, 1999
      - Species †Myllokunmingia fengjiaoa Shu, Zhang & Han, 1999
    - Genus †Zhongjianichthys Shu, 2003
      - Species †Zhongjianichthys rostratus Shu, 2003

== Paleoecology ==
Myllokunmingiids were likely active swimmers and probably occupied a niche in the pelagic (open water) foodchain as suspension feeders, filtering small food particles and prey out of the water column. They would have been ideal prey for contemporary predators due to being soft-bodied, muscular and high-calorie targets, driving the evolution of enhanced visual systems (i.e., the four camera-type eyes identified by Lei et al.) that enable detection and evasion of threats. The dense fossil aggregations in which myllokunmingiid specimens often occur may reflect schooling behavior, noted by Lei et al. to be a common anti-predator response in modern teleost fishes.

An active swimming lifestyle may explain the rarity of their preservation, which enabled escape from sediment flows that would bury them.

In contrast to other myllokunmingiids, Zhongjianichthys likely had a benthic lifestyle with intermittent burrowing due to its inferred limited swimming ability.

== Phylogeny ==
Relationships of stem and early crown chordates after Mussini et al., 2024:

- Chordata (total group)
  - †Banffia
  - †Heteromorphus
  - - †Skeemella
    - - †Nesonektris
      - - †Vetulicolidae
        - - †Didazoon
          - †Pomatrum
          - †Yuyuanozoon
          - - †Yunnanozoon
            - - †Cathaymyrus
              - †Pikaia
              - Chordata (crown group)
                - Cephalochordata
                - - Tunicata
                  - - †Metaspriggina
                    - - †Myllokunmingiidae
                      - Vertebrata

Alternative cladogram following Lerosey-Aubril and Ortega-Hernández 2024 (note that genetic evidence supports a closer relationship to vertebrates for tunicates than to cephalochordates/lancelets)

- Chordata
  - - †Vetulicolia
    - - Cephalochordata
      - Tunicata
  - Vertebrata total group
    - †Pikaia
    - - †Yunnanozoon
      - - †Myllokunmingiidae
        - - †Nuucichthys
          - †Metaspriggina
          - †Emmonsaspis
          - - †Conodonta
            - Crown group Vertebrata

Cladogram of Vertebrata focusing on jawless fish after Reeves and colleagues (2023):

- Vertebrata total group
  - †Haikouella (==†Yunnanozoon)
  - - †Metaspriggina
    - †Myllokunmingiida
    - Vertebrata crown group
      - Cyclostomi total group
        - †Anaspida
          - †Birkeniida
          - - †Lasanius
            - - †Jamoytius
              - †Euphanerops
        - - †Euconodonta
          - Cyclostomi crown group
            - Myxinoidea
            - Petromyzontida
      - Gnathostomata total group
        - †Pteraspidomorphi
          - †Astraspis
          - - †Arandaspida
            - †Heterostraci
        - - †Thelodonti
            - †Furcacaudiformes
            - †Thelodontiformes
          - - †Pituriaspida
            - - †Galeaspida
              - - †Osteostraci
                - Gnathostomata (traditional usage)
                  - †Antiarchi
                  - - †Arthrodira
                    - Gnathostomata crown group
                      - Osteichthyes
                      - Chondrichthyes

== See also ==
Other early vertebrates or transitional between olfactores and vertebrates are:

- Nuucichthys (Drumian)
- Emmonsaspis (Cambrian Stage 4)
- Zhongxiniscus (Cambrian Stage 3)
- Metaspriggina (Middle Cambrian)
