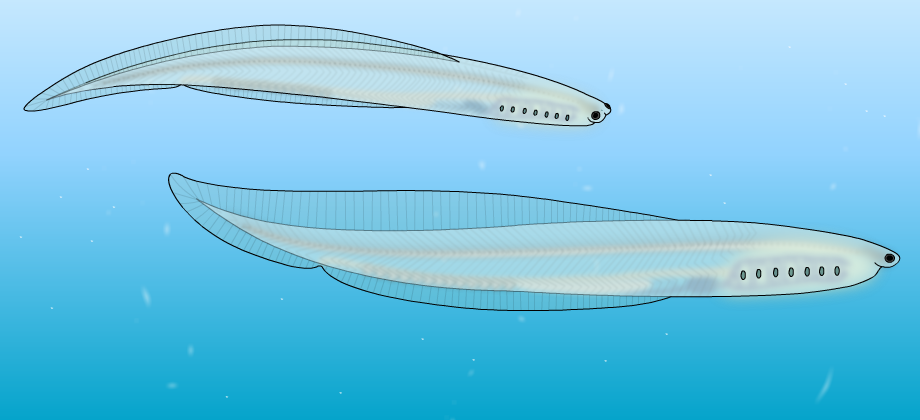

Scientific classification
- Kingdom: Animalia
- Phylum: Chordata
- Infraphylum: Agnatha?
- Genus: †Zhongxiniscus; Luo and Hu, 2001
- Species: †Z. intermedius

Binomial name
- †Zhongxiniscus intermedius Luo and Hu, 2001

= Zhongxiniscus =

Zhongxiniscus Temporal range: Cambrian Stage 3, 518 Ma

Extinct genus of chordates

Zhongxiniscus is a genus of primitive chordate from eastern Yunnan that lived during the Early Cambrian. Known from a single specimen, it had a small, broad and short, fish-like body that was roughly ten millimeters in length. It possessed S-shaped myomeres, numbering roughly seven per one millimeter of length. Two triangular fins are evident on the dorsal margin.

== Evolutionary relationships ==
When compared to other Cambrian chordates like the possible cephalochordate Cathaymyrus and the two known vertebrates Haikouichthys and Myllokunmingia, Zhongxiniscus resembles Cathaymyrus in having S-shaped myomeres, but is different in having a dorsal fin and a shorter body. Zhongxiniscus approaches in form to Haikouichthys and Myllokunmingia in its myomeres and its dorsal fin, but differs from the latter two having zigzag myomeres and fin rays, which Zhongxiniscus evidently lacks.

For these reasons, Zhongxiniscus is tentatively considered to be an intermediate form between Cathaymyrus and the two vertebrates Haikouichthys and Myllokunmingia.
