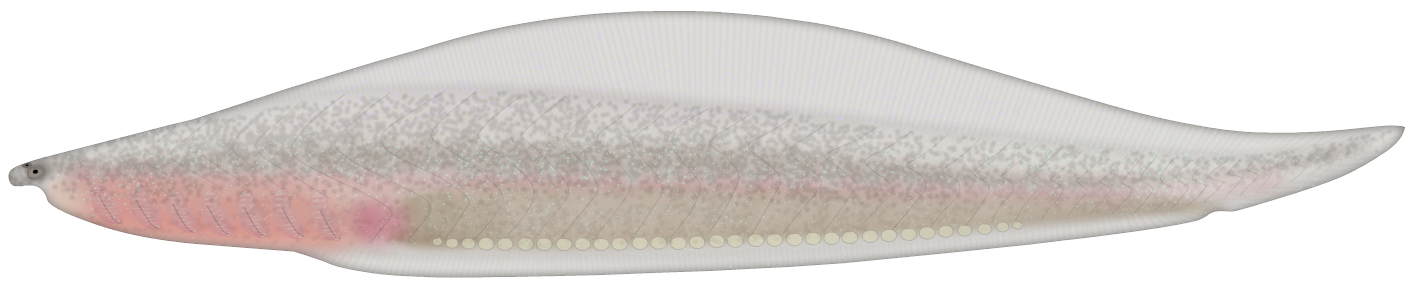
- Restoration

Scientific classification
- Kingdom: Animalia
- Phylum: Chordata
- Infraphylum: Agnatha
- Order: †Myllokunmingiida
- Family: †Myllokunmingiidae
- Genus: †Haikouichthys; Luo et al., 1999
- Species: †H. ercaicunensis

Binomial name
- †Haikouichthys ercaicunensis Luo et al., 1999

= Haikouichthys =

Haikouichthys Temporal range: Cambrian Stage 3, 518 Ma

Extinct genus of jawless fishes

Haikouichthys is an extinct genus of fish-like, stem-vertebrate chordate animal that lived during the Cambrian period, 518 million years ago, in what is now the Yunnan Province of China. Alongside Myllokunmingia and Zhongjianichthys (which like Haikouichthys are part of the family Myllokunmingiidae) it is considered to be among the earliest known members of the vertebrate lineage in the fossil record.

The type species, Haikouichthys ercaicunensis, was first described in 1999 in addition to its confamilial, Myllokunmingia, and more than 500 specimens were referred to this taxon as of 2003. The holotype was found in the Yuanshan member of the Qiongzhusi Formation in the 'Eoredlichia' Zone near Ercai Village in the Haikou Subdistrict (not to be confused with the city of Haikou in Hainan) of Xishan, Kunming, hence its specific name, which means "Haikou fish from Ercaicun". The fossil (along with Myllokunmingia's holotype) was recovered among the Chengjiang fauna, in one of a series of Lagerstätten sites where thousands of exquisitely preserved soft-bodied fossils have already been found.

Haikouichthys had a defined skull, vertebral elements and other characteristics that have led paleontologists to label it a vertebrate or at least a craniate, with the most recent phylogenetic analyses placing it, Myllokunmingia or the family Myllokunmingiidae on the vertebrate stem. Hou and colleagues have considered Haikouichthys to be synonymous with Myllokunmingia, but subsequent studies led by the British paleontologist Simon Conway Morris identified the genera to be distinct taxa on the basis of their gill arrangements, the absence of branchial rays in Myllokunmingia and the muscle segments (myomeres) having a more acute shape in Haikouichthys. Conversely, specimens of Haikouichthys, Myllokunmingia and Zhongjianichthys were suggested by Hou et al. in their book, The Cambrian Fossils of Chengjiang, China, to be taphonomic variants (i.e., of the same animal but in different states of decay), preferring to use the name Myllokunmingia to refer to myllokunmingiid specimens in their work in concurrence with Hou et al., 2002 due to what they argue to be the lack of certainty in the reliability of the distinguishing characters between the three taxa, a position supported by some other researchers.

In a 2026 study, Haikouichthys and related animals were interpreted to have four camera-type eyes, which would make this the ancestral condition of the vertebrate total group, the smaller pair of eyes closer to the midline was suggested to be homologous to the pineal eye of modern vertebrates.

== Description ==
Size of Haikouichthys (orange) and Myllokunmingia (light green) compared to other Cambrian chordates

Haikouichthys is about 2.5 cm (1 in) long and has a slenderer body than Myllokunmingia.

=== Head ===
In the head, researchers have identified four camera-type eyes, an "upper lip", cranial cartilages, at least six (up to possibly nine) gills with fine filaments, and otic capsules. The "upper lip" was compared to a similar organ in lamprey ammocoete larvae by Malatt, who believed it may have functioned as a multipurpose "hand" in Haikouichthys and relatives, serving either in draping over clusters of food particles on the ocean floor or stirring them up into the water column for filter-feeding. It is thought that the brain of Haikouichthys was reasonably well-developed; Northcutt considered it likely that it had the same major brain divisions found in extant vertebrates.

==== Eyes ====
In addition to an already-identified pair of lateral eyes, what were previously interpreted as nasal sacs were reinterpeted as a pair of smaller, medial camera-type eyes in 2026 by Lei and colleagues based on a study of six specimens of Haikouichthys and four specimens of indeterminate myllokunmingids. In this new paradigm, Haikouichthys and relatives had four camera-type eyes capable of image formation, with the two smaller medial eyes thought to be homologous with the pineal/parapineal system of crown-group vertebrates. The four eyes, probably adapted to different visual field perception, orientation and even function, likely served a role in navigation and predator evasion.

=== Body ===
Anatomical diagram of a myllokunmingiid

A notochord with vertebral elements has been identified along with zigzag myomeres, a sail-like dorsal continuous with a caudal fin and a slender ventral fin separated from the latter by an anal opening. The fin radials of Haikouichthys show similarity to those of hagfish and lampreys, and they seem to have radial orientation; they angle anteriorly towards the head, vertically in the center, and posteriorly towards the tail. Additionally, an intestine has been identified as well as a pericardic cavity and around 13 serially arranged gonads — which is considered a basal trait shared with the lancelets.

== Paleoecology ==
Haikouichthys was likely an active swimmer which lived in bright, shallow seas. Its active swimming lifestyle may also explain the rarity of its preservation, which enabled escape from sediment flows that would bury it. It likely engaged in suspension feeding, filtering small food particles out of the water column. It would have been an ideal prey for contemporary predators due to being a soft-bodied, muscular and high-calorie target, driving the evolution of enhanced visual systems (i.e., its four camera-type eyes).

== See also ==
- Yunnanozoon
- Pikaia
- Metaspriggina
- Nuucichthys
- Emmonsaspis
