= Pikaia =

Pikaia Temporal range: Middle Cambrian 505 Ma
- Anatomical reconstruction of Pikaia gracilens after Mussini et al. (2024)

Scientific classification
- Kingdom: Animalia
- Phylum: Chordata
- Family: †Pikaiidae; Walcott, 1911
- Genus: †Pikaia; Walcott, 1911
- Species: †P. gracilens

Binomial name
- †Pikaia gracilens Walcott, 1911

Extinct genus of primitive chordates

Pikaia gracilens is an extinct, primitive chordate marine animal known from the Middle Cambrian Burgess Shale of British Columbia. Described in 1911 by Charles Doolittle Walcott as an annelid, and in 1979 by Harry B. Whittington and Simon Conway Morris as a chordate, it became "the most famous early chordate fossil", or "famously known as the earliest described Cambrian chordate". It is estimated to have lived during the latter period of the Cambrian explosion. Since its initial discovery, more than a hundred specimens have been recovered.

The body structure resembles that of the lancelet and it swam perhaps much like an eel. A notochord and myomeres (segmented blocks of skeletal muscles) span the entire length of the body, and are considered the defining signatures of chordate characters. Its primitive nature is indicated by the body covering, a cuticle, which is characteristic of invertebrates and some protochordates. A reinterpretation in 2024 found evidence of the gut canal, dorsal nerve cord and myomeres, and suggested that the taxon was previously interpreted upside down.

The exact phylogenetic position is unclear, though recent studies suggest that it is likely a stem-chordate with crown group traits. Previously proposed affinities include those of cephalochordata, craniata, or a stem-chordate not closely related to any extant lineage. Popularly but incorrectly attributed as an ancestor of all vertebrates, or the oldest fish, or the oldest ancestor of humans, it is generally viewed as a basal chordate; it is a close relative of vertebrate ancestors but it is not an ancestor itself. It was contemporaneous with Metaspriggina, which is considerably more closely related to vertebrates than Pikaia is.

== Discovery ==
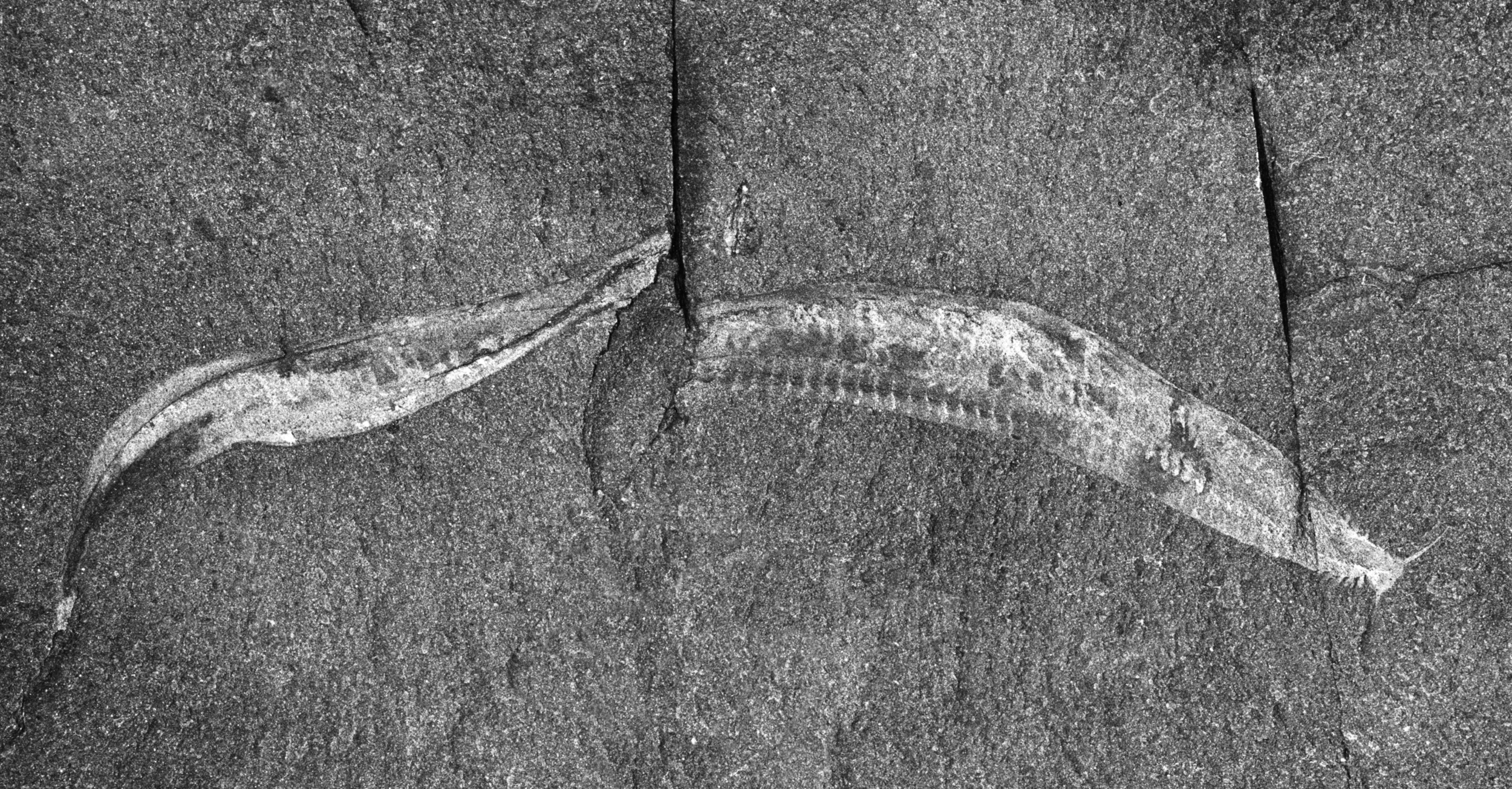
Fossil of Pikaia gracilens (Syntype USNM PAL 57628)

The fossils of Pikaia gracilens was discovered by Charles Walcott from the Burgess Shale member of the Stephen Formation in British Columbia, and described it in 1911. He named it after Pika Peak, a mountain in Alberta, Canada. Based on the obvious and regular segmentation of the body, as is the feature of annelids, Walcott classified it as a polychaete worm and created a new family Pikaidae for it. (Princeton palaeontologist Benjamin Franklin Howell changed the name of the family to Pikaiidae in 1962.) Walcott was aware of the limitation of his classification, as he noted: "I am unable to place it within any of the families of the Polychaeta, owing to the absence of parapodia [paired protrusions on the sides of polychaete worms] on the body segments back of the fifth."

University of Cambridge palaeontologist Harry B. Whittington and his student Simon Conway Morris re-examined the Burgess Shale fauna and noted the anatomical details of Pikaia for the first time. The fossil specimens bears features of notochord and muscle blocks that are fundamental structures of chordates, and not of annelids. In 1977, Conway Morris presented a paper that indicated the possible chordate position, without further explanation. He and Whittington were convinced that the animal was obviously a chordate, as they wrote in Scientific American in 1979:

Finally, we find among the Burgess Shale fauna one of the earliest-known invertebrate representatives of our own conspicuous corner of the animal kingdom: the chordate phylum... The chordates are represented in the Burgess Shale by the genus Pikaia and the single species P. gracilens.

Conway Morris formally placed P. gracilens among the chordates in a paper in the Annual Review of Ecology and Systematics that same year. However, he provided no structural analyses such as using microscopes to confirm the chordate features. The comparative description only earned a "putative" chordate status. The fossil's chordate nature was received sceptically for several decades. Only in 2012, when detailed analysis was reported by Conway Morris and Jean-Bernard Caron, that the chordate position became generally accepted.

The fossils are found only in a restricted series of horizons in the strata exposed on Fossil Ridge, close to the Yoho National Park. From the same location, other fish-like animal fossils named Metaspriggina were discovered in 1993. Conway Morris identified the animals as another Cambrian chordate. The fossil specimens are preserved in the Smithsonian Institution and the Royal Ontario Museum.

== Description ==
Size of Pikaia (dark cyan) compared to a human hand and other Cambrian chordates

Pikaia has a lancelet-like body, tapering at both ends, laterally flat and lacked a well-defined head. It measures an average of about 1 1/2 inches (3.8 cm) in length. Walcott recorded the longest individuals as 5 cm (2.0 in) in length. Pikaia has a pair of large, antenna-like tentacles on its head that resembles those of invertebrates such as snails. The attachment of the tentacles makes a two-lobed structure of the head. The tentacles may be comparable to those in the present-day hagfish, a jawless chordate. It has a small circular mouth that could be used to eat small food particles in a single bite. There is a series of short appendages on either side of the underside of the head just after the mouth, and their exact nature or function is unknown. The pharynx is associated with six pairs of slits with tiny filaments that could be used for respiratory apparatus. In these ways, it differs from the modern lancelets, which have distinct pharyngeal gill slits on either sides of the pharynx and are used for filter feeding.

A major primitive structure of Pikaia is a cuticle as its body covering. Cuticle is a hard protein layer predominantly found in invertebrates such as arthropods, molluscs, echinoderms and nematodes. Unlike a typical cuticle, the cuticle of Pikaia does not have hard extracellular (exoskeleton) protection, and the entire body is essentially soft-bodied. Although primitive, Pikaia shows the essential prerequisites for vertebrates. When alive, Pikaia was a compressed, leaf-shaped animal with an expanded tail fin; the flattened body is divided into pairs of segmented muscle blocks, seen as faint vertical lines. The muscles lie on either side of a flexible structure resembling a rod that runs from the tip of the head to the tip of the tail.

Pikaia was an active and free swimmer. It likely swam by throwing its body into a series of S-shaped, zigzag curves, similar to the movement of eels; fish inherited the same swimming movement, but they generally have stiffer backbones. These adaptations may have allowed Pikaia to filter particles from the water as it swam along. Pikaia was probably a slow swimmer, since it lacked the fast-twitch fibers that are associated with rapid swimming in modern chordates.

=== Reinterpretations ===
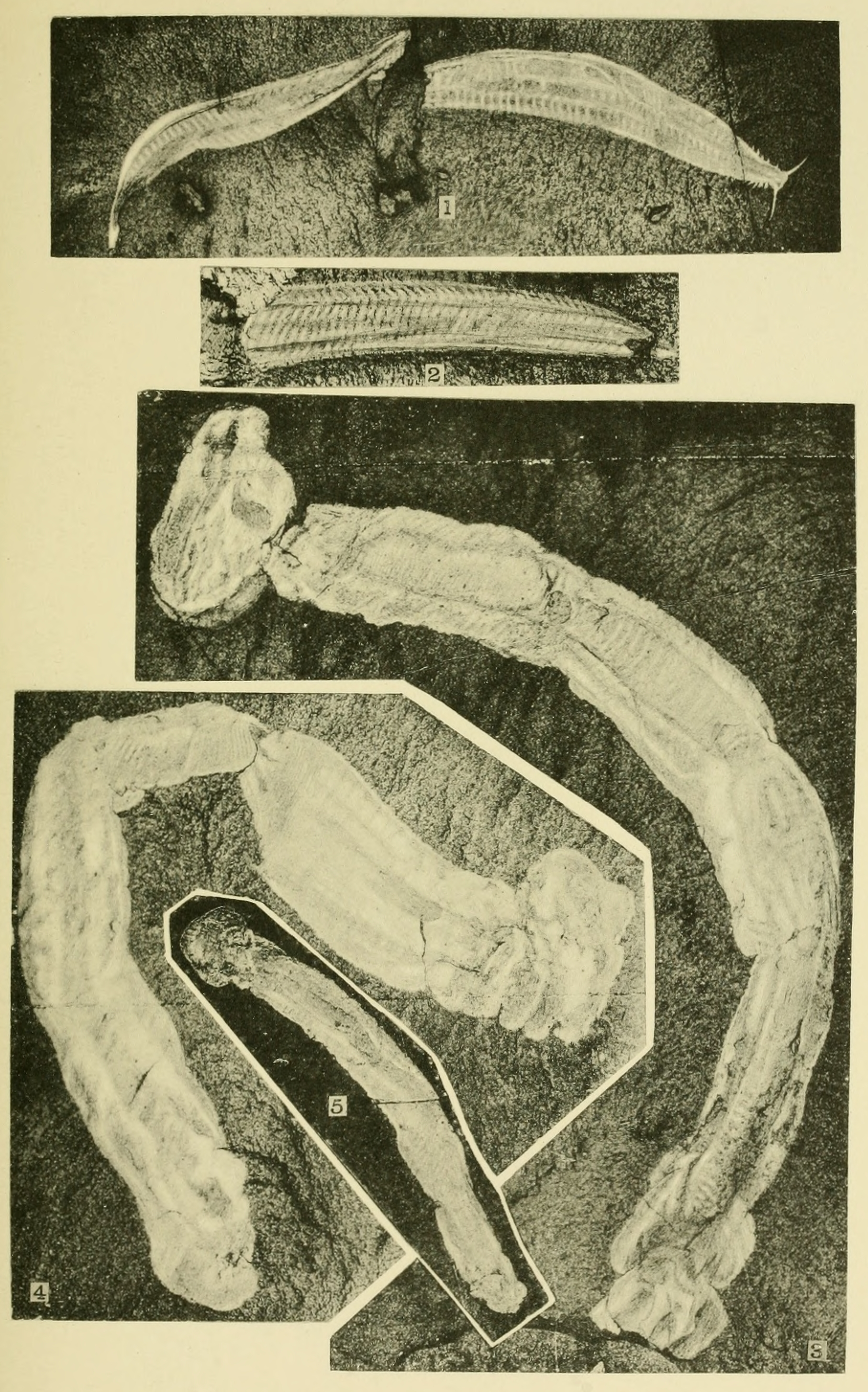
Plate 20 of Walcott Cambrian Geology and Paleontology II (1911), by Charles Doolittle Walcott, showing fossils of Pikaia and Oesia

Walcott's original summary of the description of Pikaia reads:

Body elongate, slender, and tapering at each end. It is formed of many segments that are defined by strong annular shiny lines. Head small with two large eyes and two tentacles... Back of the head the first five segments carry short parapodia that appear to be divided into two parts. The enteric canal extends from end to end without change in character... This was one of the active, free-swimming annelids that suggest the Nephthydidae of the Polychaeta.

Whittington and Conway Morris were the first to realise that Walcott's description and classification were not reliable and mostly inaccurate. They compared the body segments as described by Walcott with living animals and found that they were similar to the muscle bundles of chordates such as the living Amphioxus (Branchiostoma) as well as fishes, and not to superficial segments of annelids. They pictured that the muscles would be essential for swimming in water in wriggling motions. The enteric canal as observed by Walcott was not an ordinary digestive tract, it runs along with a stiff rod that resembles a notochord. They reported in 1979: "Although Pikaia differs from Amphioxus, in several important respects, the conclusion is that it is not a worm but a chordate appears inescapable."

Conway Morris was convinced that the longitudinal rod was a notochord and the segments were muscle blocks that he concluded that Pikaia "is a primitive chordate rather than a polychaete. The earliest fish scales are Upper Cambrian, and Pikaia may not be far removed from the ancestral fish." In 1982, he added further description in his Atlas of the Burgess Shale that Pikaia had one or more fins, but did not specify where they were present.

Pikaia was not popularly known as a chordate fossil or as an ancient chordate until 1989. That year, Harvard University palaeontologist Stephen Jay Gould wrote in his book Wonderful Life: The Burgess Shale and the Nature of History: "Pikaia is not an annelid worm. It is a chordate, a member of our own phylum—in fact, the first recorded member of our immediate ancestry." From this remark Pikaia became generally recognised as a chordate and ancestor of vertebrates.

In 1993, Conway Morris came up with another possible chordate feature. He identified structures that looked like gill slits but gave a cautious remark: "[They] may have been present, but are hard to identify with certainty in the compressed material available. The tiny pores on the side of the pharynx are normally gill slits in living chordates. He also noticed that Pikaia is similar to Amphioxus in most general aspects, with major difference in its notochord not reaching the anterior end.

Not all palaeontologists were convinced of the chordate designation without better analysis. In 2001, Nicholas D. Holland from the Scripps Institution of Oceanography and Junyuan Chen from the Chinese Academy of Sciences criticised the presentation in Wonderful Life, saying that the "reinterpretation [of Pikaia as a chordate] became almost universally accepted after its unqualified and forceful endorsement by Gould"; concluding that "the cephalochordate affinity of Pikaia is at best only weakly indicated by the characters visible in fossils discovered so far." In 2010, an international team of palaeontologists argued that Pikaia has sufficiently invertebrate characters, and that it mostly look like a much younger extinct animal, the Tully monster (Tullimonstrum gregarium), which is still debated as either an invertebrate or a chordate.

Another component of Pikaia fossils that constrains the animal to be accepted as a chordate is its distinct invertebrate character; its preservational mode suggests that it had cuticle. The cuticle as a body covering is uncharacteristic of the vertebrates, but is a dominant feature of invertebrates. The presence of earlier chordates among the Chengjiang, including Haikouichthys and Myllokunmingia, appears to show that cuticle is not necessary for preservation, overruling the taphonomic argument, but the presence of tentacles remains intriguing, and the organism cannot be assigned conclusively, even to the vertebrate stem group. Its anatomy closely resembles the modern creature Branchiostoma.

A fossil species Myoscolex ateles, discovered in 1979 from Cambrian Emu Bay Shale of Kangaroo Island in South Australia, had been debated as among the oldest annelids, or at least other invertebrate groups. Polish palaeontologist Jerzy Dzik in his formal description in 2003 notes that it "closely resembles the slightly geologically younger Pikaia" in having smooth cuticle as well as muscular segmentation, and projections on its backside (ventral chaetae) that look like Pikaia's tentacles. He concluded:

In fact, there is little evidence for chordate affinities of Pikaia. Its relationship with Myoscolex [as annelid in his proposition] appears a much better solution. Both were initially identified as polychaetes and this line of inference perhaps deserves confrontation with more recent evidence than that available to the authors who proposed these genera.

=== Comprehensive description ===
Previous anatomical reconstruction of Pikaia gracilens based on Conway Morris & Caron (2012)

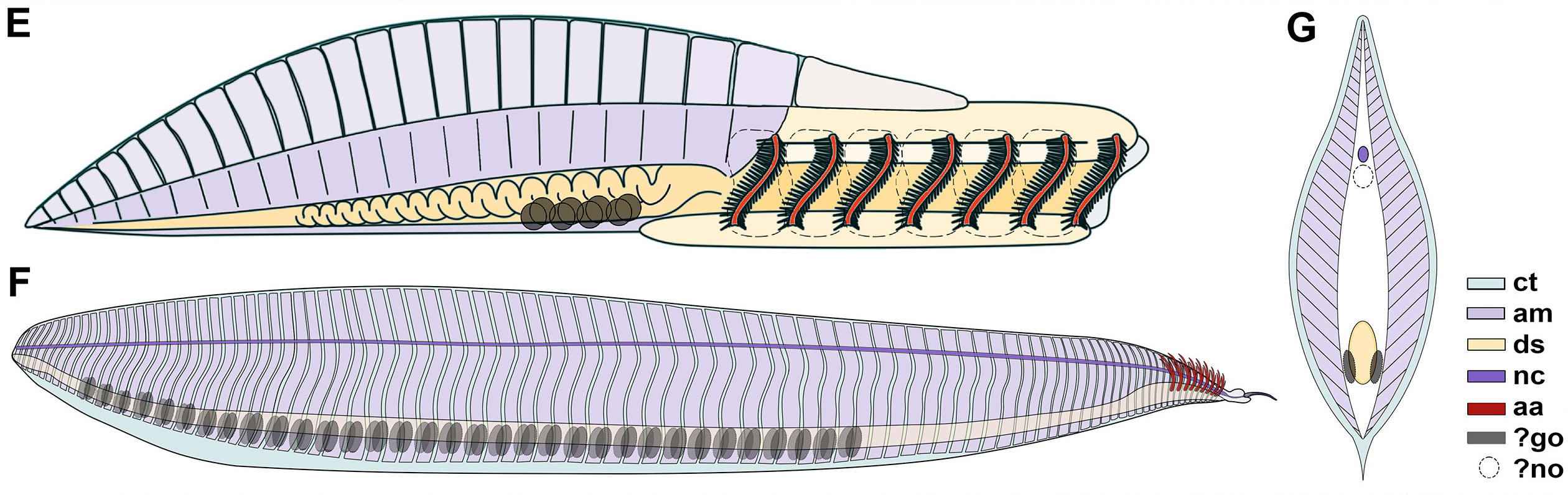
Anatomical reconstruction of Pikaia gracilens in side on (F) and cross-sectional (G) views compared to Yunnanozoon (E) after Mussini et al. (2024) Key: ct, connective tissue, integument; am, axial musculature; ds, digestive system; nc, dorsal nerve cord; aa, anterior appendages; ?go, possible gonads; ?no, hypothetical notochord.

The first comprehensive description of Pikaia was published by Conway Morris and Jean-Bernard Caron in the May 2012 issue of Biological Reviews. The anatomical examination and interpretation based on 114 fossil specimens confirm the classification as a chordate. According to the new assessment, Pikaia fossils indicate important features that define the animal as a primitive chordate. All Pikaia fossils are in the range of 1.5 to 6 centimetres (0.59 to 2.36 in) in length, with an average of 4 centimetres (1.6 in). Having a laterally compressed (taller than wide) and fusiform (tapering at both ends) body, the exact width and height are variable, and normally its height is twice that of its width throughout it body.

Closeup of the head region Key: Aa, anterior appendages My, myomeres Nc, dorsal nerve cord

The head is bilaterally symmetrical with a distinct pair of tentacles. Due to its small size, only about 1 mm in diameter, the structural details are indistinguishable. Some specimens show a darker central line on the tentacles which may represent a nervous fibre; thus making the tentacles as sensory feelers. A mouth is marked by a small opening at the anterior end of the gut towards the underside of the head. There are no jaws and teeth. Walcott had mentioned the presence of two large eyes, but no specimens, including Walcott's original collection, show any evidence of eyes.

One of the most unusual body parts is a series of appendages just posterior to the tentacles. Walcott had called the appendages parapodia, as a kind of body protrusions that aid locomotion in snails, and mentioned five parapodia in each individual. He was even puzzled by the absence on the major part of the body, with other specimens having up to nine such appendages that could not be parapodia. These external appendages were reinterpreted as gills in a 2024 study. Fins are present as an expansion of the body on the dorsal and ventral sides. They are not present in many specimens indicating that they are delicate membranes and were lost during fossilisation. However, the 2024 study suggested that Pikaia was previously interpreted upside down, indicating that the 'dorsal and ventral' sides of Pikiaia were actually inverted.

The backside of Pikaia fossils show a hollow tubular structure that extends throughout most of the body length, but not the anterior region. It is easily noticeable as a highly light-reflective portion and is known as the dorsal organ. Once described as the notochord, its nature is not yet fully resolved and could be a storage organ. The true notochord, along with a nerve cord, is a fine lateral line that runs just beneath the thick dorsal organ. A 2024 study instead found evidence of the gut canal, dorsal nerve cord and myomeres from the specimens, providing more evidence with diagnostic features that Pikaia is a chordate.

The main chordate character is a series of myomeres that extends from the anterior to the posterior region. On average, there are 100 such myomeres in each individual. The muscle segments are not simply "annular shiny lines" as Walcott described, but are in concentric bends in the form of V-shaped chevron. The myomeres at the anterior end as simpler in appearance and show circular arrangement. Conway Morris and Caron concluded:

Whilst the possibility that Pikaia is simply convergent on the chordates cannot be dismissed, we prefer to build a scenario that regards Pikaia as the most stem-ward of the chordates with links to the phylogenetically controversial yunnanozoans. This hypothesis has implications for the evolution of the myomeres, notochord and gills.

== Evolutionary importance ==
Much debate on whether Pikaia is a vertebrate ancestor, its worm-like appearance notwithstanding, exists in scientific circles. It looks like a worm that has been flattened sideways (lateral compression). The fossils compressed within the Burgess Shale show chordate features such as traces of an elongate notochord, dorsal nerve cord, and blocks of muscles (myotomes) down either side of the body – all critical features for the evolution of the vertebrates.

The notochord, a flexible rod-like structure that runs along the back of the animal, lengthens and stiffens the body so that it can be flexed from side to side by the muscle blocks for swimming. In the fish and all subsequent vertebrates, the notochord forms the backbone (or vertebral column). The backbone strengthens the body, supports strut-like limbs, and protects the vital dorsal nerve cord, while at the same time allowing the body to bend.

A Pikaia lookalike, the lancelet Branchiostoma, still exists today. With a notochord and paired muscle blocks, the lancelet and Pikaia belong to the chordate group of animals from which the vertebrates descended. Molecular studies have refuted earlier hypotheses that lancelets might be the closest living relative to the vertebrates, instead favoring tunicates in this position; other extant and fossil groups, such as acorn worms and graptolites, are more primitive. (Note: Acorn worms are classified as hemichordates, which have a notochord-like structure only at the early stage of their lives.)

The presence of cuticle, one of the principal characters of higher invertebrates, in Pikaia can be understood from the evolutionary trends. A Cambrian invertebrate, Myoscolex ateles was described to be structurally similar to Pikaia particularly in having smooth cuticle as well as muscular segmentation, and projections on its backside (ventral chaetae) that look like Pikaia's tentacles. Although chordates normally lack the cuticle, a type of cuticle is present in some cephalochordates, indicating that primitive characters are retained in lower chordates.

Subsequently, Mallatt and Holland reconsidered Conway Morris and Caron's description, and concluded that many of the newly recognized characters are unique, already-divergent specializations that would not be helpful for establishing Pikaia as a basal chordate.

=== Development of the head ===
The first sign of head development, cephalization, is seen in chordates such as Pikaia and Branchiostoma. It is thought that development of a head structure resulted from a long body shape, a swimming habit, and a mouth at the end that came into contact with the environment first, as the animal swam forward. The search for food required ways of continually testing what lay ahead so it is thought that anatomical structures for seeing, feeling, and smelling developed around the mouth. The information these structures gathered was processed by a swelling of the nerve cord (efflorescence) – the precursor of the brain. Altogether, these front-end structures formed the rather indistinct heads of these chordates during the Cambrian period.

=== Evolutionary interpretation ===
Once thought to be closely related to the ancestor of all vertebrates, Pikaia has received particular attention among the multitude of animal fossils found in the famous Burgess Shale and other Cambrian fauna. In 1979, Whittington and Conway Morris first explained the evolutionary importance of Pikaia. Realising the fossil to be that of a chordate in the Cambrian rocks, chordates could have originated much earlier than expected, as they commented: "The superb preservation of this Middle Cambrian organism [Pikaia] makes it a landmark history of the phylum [Chordata] to which all vertebrates, including man, belong." It is for this knowledge Pikaia as an old chordate that it is often misleadingly and falsely attributed to as an ancestor of all vertebrates, or the oldest fish, or the oldest ancestor of humans.

Before Pikaia and other Cambrian chordates were fully appreciated, it was generally believed that the first chordates appeared much later, such as in Ordovician (484–443 mya). The establishment of Cambrian chordates, according to Stephen Jay Gould, prompted "revised views of evolution, ecology and development," and remarked: "So much for chordate uniqueness marked by slightly later evolution." However, Gould did not believe that Pikaia itself was unique as an early chordate or that it was "the actual ancestor of vertebrates;" he presumed that there could be undiscovered fossils that are more closely linked to vertebrate ancestry.

Since the 1990s, other Cambrian chordates have been described that are considerably more closely related to living vertebrates than Pikaia, including Metaspriggina (also known from the Burgess Shale) and the myllokunmingiids.

Cladogram of chordates after Mussini et al, 2024, showing position of Pikaia as a stem-chordate.

- Chordata (total group)
  - †Banffia
  - †Heteromorphus
  - - †Skeemella
    - - †Nesonektris
      - - †Vetulicolidae
        - - †Didazoon
          - †Pomatrum
          - †Yuyuanozoon
          - - †Yunnanozoon
            - - †Cathaymyrus
              - †Pikaia
              - Chordata (crown group)
                - Cephalochordata
                - - Tunicata
                  - - †Metaspriggina
                    - - †Myllokunmingia
                      - Vertebrata

Alternative cladogram following Lerosey-Aubril and Ortega-Hernández 2024 which found Pikaia as a stem-vertebrate (note that genetic evidence supports a closer relationship to vertebrates for tunicates than to cephalochordates/lancelets)

- Chordata
  - - †Vetulicolia
    - - Cephalochordata
      - Tunicata
  - Vertebrata total group
    - †Pikaia
    - - †Yunnanozoon
      - - †Myllokunmingiidae
        - - †Nuucichthys
          - †Metaspriggina
          - †Emmonsaspis
          - - †Conodonta
            - Crown group Vertebrata

=== Gould's interpretation and evolutionary contingency ===
Gould, in his presidential address of the Paleontological Society on 27 October 1988, cited Pikaia to explain the trends of evolutionary changes:

Wind back life's tape to the Burgess (first erasing what actually came after), let it play again, and this time a quite different cast may emerge. If the cast lacked Pikaia, the first chordate, we might not be here—and the world would be no worse... Let us thank our lucky stars for the survival of Pikaia.

He elaborated the same idea in "An epilogue on Pikaia" in his book Wonderful Life "to save the best for the last," in which he made a statement:

Pikaia is the missing and final link in our story of contingency—the direct connection between Burgess decimation and eventual human evolution... Wind the tape of life back to Burgess times, and let it play again. If Pikaia does not survive in the replay, we are wiped out of future history—all of us, from shark to robin to orangutan... And so, if you wish to ask the question of the age—why do humans exist?—a major part of the answer, touching those aspects of the issue that science can treat at all, must be: because Pikaia survived the Burgess decimation.

This interpretation that the chances of evolutionary products are unpredictable is known as evolutionary contingency. Gould, from this statement, is regarded as "the most famous proponent" of the concept. His idea has inspired many research involving evolutionary contingency from palaeontology to molecular biology. He used Pikaia among the Cambrian animals as an epitome of contingent event in the entire evolution of life; if Pikaia had not existed, the rest of chordate animals might not have evolved, thus completely changing the diversity of life as we know. According to him, contingency is a major factor that drives large-scale evolution (macroevolution) and dictates that evolution has no inevitable destiny or outcome. However, as Gould explained, "The bad news is that we can't possibly perform the experiment."

== Ecology ==
Life restoration of Pikaia

Pikaia is suggested to have been an active swimming organism that swam close to the seafloor (nektobenthic) using side to side undulations of its flattened posterior for propulsion. The anterior appendages are unlikely to have been used in feeding, and may have had a respiratory function. Pikaia is believed to have fed on small particles of organic matter.

== See also ==
- Fossils of the Burgess Shale
- Paleobiota of the Burgess Shale
