= Metaspriggina =

Metaspriggina Temporal range: Cambrian, Miaolingian (Wuliuan–Guzhangian) Possible Cambrian Stage 4 records
- Specimen ROMIP 65347

Scientific classification
- Kingdom: Animalia
- Phylum: Chordata
- Stem group: Vertebrata
- Genus: †Metaspriggina; Simonetta & Insom 1993
- Species: †M. walcotti

Binomial name
- †Metaspriggina walcotti Simonetta & Insom 1993

Cambrian fossil genus of chordate

Metaspriggina (from Greek μετά metắ + Spriggina) is an extinct genus of fish-like, stem-vertebrate chordate animal known from the Middle Cambrian of North America, including the Burgess Shale. It is considered to be one of the earliest and most primitive members of the vertebrate lineage, transitional between early chordates and later, more advanced jawless fish.

== Description ==
Size of Metaspriggina (dark brown) compared to other Cambrian chordates, and a diagrammatic reconstruction of the anatomy of Metaspriggina

The body of most Metaspriggina specimens is about 6 centimetres (2.4 in) long and around 0.8–1.3 centimetres (0.31–0.51 in) in height. The body is widest at the centre, tapering towards the head and rear end, towards a tip in the latter case, forming a distinctive "tail". The body was relatively narrow from side to side. Whether or not fins were present is unclear, and it has been suggested that Metaspriggina is likely to have been finless (comparable to the related Nuucichthys and Emmonaspis, but strongly differing from the Chinese myllokunmingiids which have well developed fins). The head was relatively small (being shorter than that present in Nuucichthys) and slightly bilobate, and bore a relatively well developed pair of apparently circular eyes, suggested to have been camera-type, and there may have been another smaller pair of eyes at the midline of the head. The main pair of eyes was originally reconstructed as facing straight vertically upwards (dorsally), but later research suggested that the eyes instead pointed forwards and outwards to the side (anterolaterally). As is ancestral for chordates and vertebrates, the mouth was jawless. The head region may have contained a cartilaginous structure. Running along the body were blocks of myomere muscle tissue, with at least 40 myomere blocks present in adult individuals (differing from the 25 and 50 myomere blocks present in the closely related Nuucichthys and Emmonaspis respectively). Metaspriggina also possessed a notochord running along the length of the body, along with seven pairs of bar structures running along each side of the branchial region at the lower front of the body (making 14 bars on each side and 28 in total), each associated with gill filaments. Running along the interior of the body was the gastrointestinal tract, which terminated in an anus, the opening of which was considerably forward of the tip of the tail. A darkened area posterior of the branchial region near the gut tract may represent the heart, with another darkened area posterior to the suggested heart proposed to be the liver.

== Palaeobiology ==
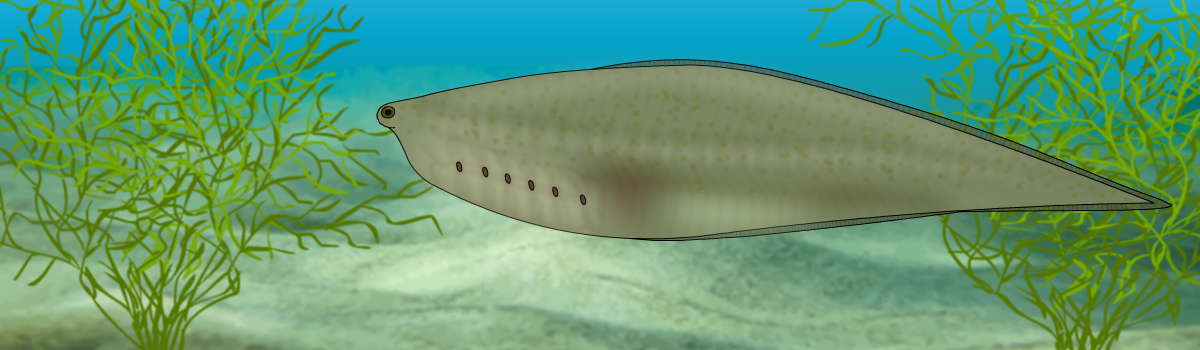
Life restoration

External videos
- Animated 3D model of Metaspriggina swimming

Analysis of its myomeres suggests that Metaspriggina was likely a efficient cruiser, swimming via undulating its body from side to side. Hydrological analysis suggests that it was likely a more efficient swimmer in open water rather than near the sediment surface. It likely had the ability to accelerate quickly from rest, which may have helped it evade predators, though it may have overall had relatively limited swimming abilities. Like other stem-vertebrates, Metaspriggina is suggested to have been a filter feeder, with extensions of the gill bars possibly functioning like gill rakers to filter food particles from the water. It is suggested to have lived in the open water column as a nektonic organism.

== Taxonomy ==
Paleogeographic map of Laurentia during the Cambrian period, showing the paleogeographic position of the Burgess Shale relative to other North American Cambrian stem-vertebrate bearing lagerstätten along with their corresponding timespans, suggested Metaspriggina timespan indicated in red (3 and 5)

Metaspriggina was originally named by Alberto M. Simonetta and Emilio Insom in 1993, based on specimen U.S.N.M. No.198611, found in the Burgess Shale. They suggested affinities to chordates or to vendozoans like Parvancorina and Spriggina, the latter of which after Metaspriggina is named, with the authors cautiously suggesting that Metaspriggina was related to Sprigginidae. A relationship with Sprigginidae has been rejected by later studies. Metaspriggina was redescribed in 2008 by Simon Conway Morris, who considered it a chordate, and then again in 2014 by Morris and Jean-Bernard Caron, by which time over 100 specimens had been collected from Burgess Shale localities including from the Walcott Quarry, Marble Canyon and several locations within Kootenay National Park. The 2014 study argued that Metaspriggina was also known from the Cambrian Stage 4-aged Kinzers Formation of Pennsylvania and the equivalently aged Parker Slate Formation in Vermont (the latter originally assigned to Emmonsaspis), though this assumption was questioned by a later 2024 study, which regarded Emmonsaspis as a valid distinct genus including the Parker Shale as well as possibly also the Kinzers material, and regarding Metaspriggina to be restricted to Canada, including the Burgess Shale (Wuliuan) and the somewhat younger Duchesnay Unit (Drumian-Guzhangian). The 2014 redescription regarded Metaspriggina as representing a true stem-vertebrate, more closely related to vertebrates than to tunicates or lancelets, an opinion which has been followed by most later authors. Metaspriggina shares a number of anatomical features with vertebrates not shared with the more primitive though contemporaneous chordate Pikaia, also known from the Burgess Shale, such as having eyes, a clear tail region posterior of the anus, and a more complex myomere structure.

=== Phylogeny ===
Relationships of stem and early crown chordates after Mussini et al., 2024:

- Chordata (total group)
  - †Banffia
  - †Heteromorphus
  - - †Skeemella
    - - †Nesonektris
      - - †Vetulicolidae
        - - †Didazoon
          - †Pomatrum
          - †Yuyuanozoon
          - - †Yunnanozoon
            - - †Cathaymyrus
              - †Pikaia
              - Chordata (crown group)
                - Cephalochordata
                - - Tunicata
                  - - †Metaspriggina
                    - - †Myllokunmingia
                      - Vertebrata

Alternative cladogram following Lerosey-Aubril and Ortega-Hernández 2024 (note that genetic evidence supports a closer relationship to vertebrates for tunicates than to cephalochordates/lancelets)

- Chordata
  - - †Vetulicolia
    - - Cephalochordata
      - Tunicata
  - Vertebrata total group
    - †Pikaia
    - - †Yunnanozoon
      - - †Myllokunmingiidae
        - - †Nuucichthys
          - †Metaspriggina
          - †Emmonsaspis
          - - †Conodonta
            - Crown group Vertebrata

Cladogram of Vertebrata focusing on jawless fish after Reeves and colleagues (2023):

- Vertebrata total group
  - †Haikouella
  - - †Metaspriggina
    - †Myllokunmingiida
    - Vertebrata crown group
      - Cyclostomi total group
        - †Anaspida
          - †Birkeniida
          - - †Lasanius
            - - †Jamoytius
              - †Euphanerops
        - - †Euconodonta
          - Cyclostomi crown group
            - Myxinoidea
            - Petromyzontida
      - Gnathostomata total group
        - †Pteraspidomorphi
          - †Astraspis
          - - †Arandaspida
            - †Heterostraci
        - - †Thelodonti
            - †Furcacaudiformes
            - †Thelodontiformes
          - - †Pituriaspida
            - - †Galeaspida
              - - †Osteostraci
                - Gnathostomata (traditional usage)
                  - †Antiarchi
                  - - †Arthrodira
                    - Gnathostomata crown group
                      - Osteichthyes
                      - Chondrichthyes

== See also ==
- Paleobiota of the Burgess Shale
