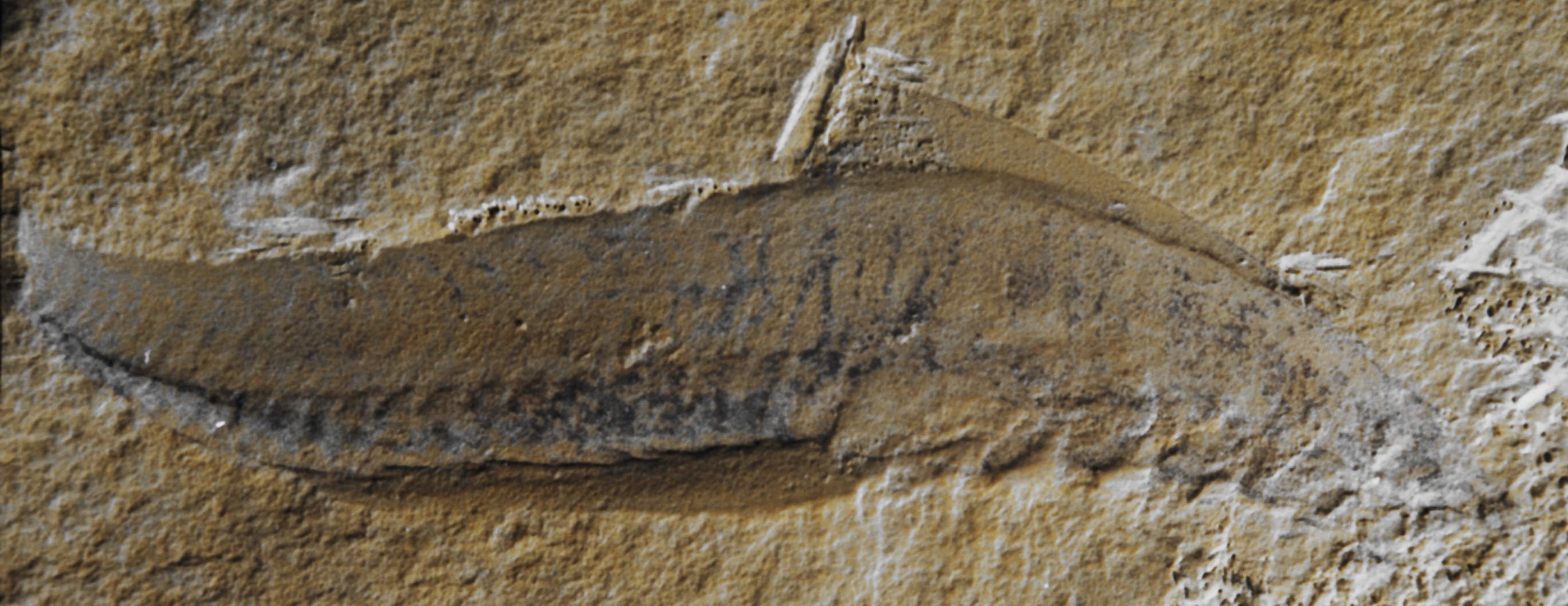
- Holotype fossil
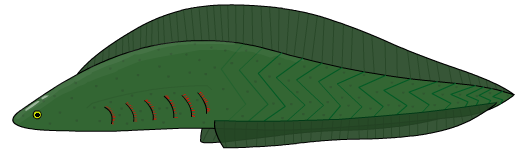
- Restoration

Scientific classification
- Kingdom: Animalia
- Phylum: Chordata
- Infraphylum: Agnatha
- Order: †Myllokunmingiida
- Family: †Myllokunmingiidae
- Genus: †Myllokunmingia; Shu, Zhang & Han, 1999
- Species: †M. fengjiaoa

Binomial name
- †Myllokunmingia fengjiaoa Shu, Zhang & Han, 1999

= Myllokunmingia =

Myllokunmingia Temporal range: 518 Ma Atdabanian

Extinct genus of jawless fishes

Myllokunmingia is an extinct genus of fish-like, stem-vertebrate chordate animal that lived during the Cambrian period, approximately 518 million years ago, in what is now the Yunnan Province of China. It was discovered alongside Haikouichthys, another genus of stem-vertebrate, in 1999 and is considered to be among the earliest known members of the vertebrate lineage in the fossil record. The holotype of the type species, Myllokunmingia fengjiaoa — and the only uncontroversial specimen thereof — was found in the Yuanshan member of the Qiongzhusi Formation in the Eoredlichia Zone near Haikou at Ercaicun, Kunming City, Yunnan, China.

== Description ==
Size of Myllokunmingia (light green) and Haikouichthys (orange) compared to other Cambrian chordates, and a anatomical diagram of a myllokunmingiid

The holotype is 28 mm long and 6 mm high. The animal has a distinct head and body with a forward, sail-like (1.5 mm) dorsal fin and a ventral fin fold further back (probably paired). The head has five or six gill pouches with hemibranchs. In the body, there are 25 muscle segments (myomeres) with rearward-facing, double-V-shaped chevrons. There is a notochord, a pharynx and a digestive tract that may run all the way to the rear tip of the animal. A mouth cannot be clearly identified. There may be a pericardial cavity. There are no fin radials. The tip of the tail in the holotype is buried in sediment.

== Taxonomy ==
Although typically treated as a distinct taxon, there has been considerable uncertainty on the assignment of this name with respect to other myllokunmingiid specimens.

Hou and colleagues in 2002 argued that Haikouichthys is a subjective junior synonym of this taxon (using the principle of the first reviser due to the two taxa being described on the same date) on the basis of the apparent presence of fin rays in Haikouichthys specimens being lithological artifacts, the gill structures missing from specimens referred to both genera being present in the specimen they studied, and the argued triviality of the difference in shapes between them. However, subsequent studies led by the British paleontologist Simon Conway Morris identified both genera to be distinct on the basis of different gill arrangement, the absence of branchial rays in Myllokunmingia and the myomeres having a more acute shape in Haikouichthys.

Nevertheless, Hou et al. in 2017 in their book, The Cambrian Fossils of Chengjiang, China, suggested that specimens referred to Myllokunmingia, Haikouichthys and Zhongjianichthys may be taphonomic variants (i.e., of the same animal but in different states of decay) and due to what they argue to be the lack of certainty in the reliability of the distinguishing characters between the three taxa, they follow the opinion of Hou et al., 2002, and use Myllokunmingia for all of them. Lerosey-Aubril and Ortega-Hernández 2024 also regarded Haikouichthys as a junior synonym of Myllokunmingia.

== See also ==
- Zhongjianichthys
- Yunnanozoon
- Pikaia
- Metaspriggina
- Nuucichthys
- Emmonsaspis
