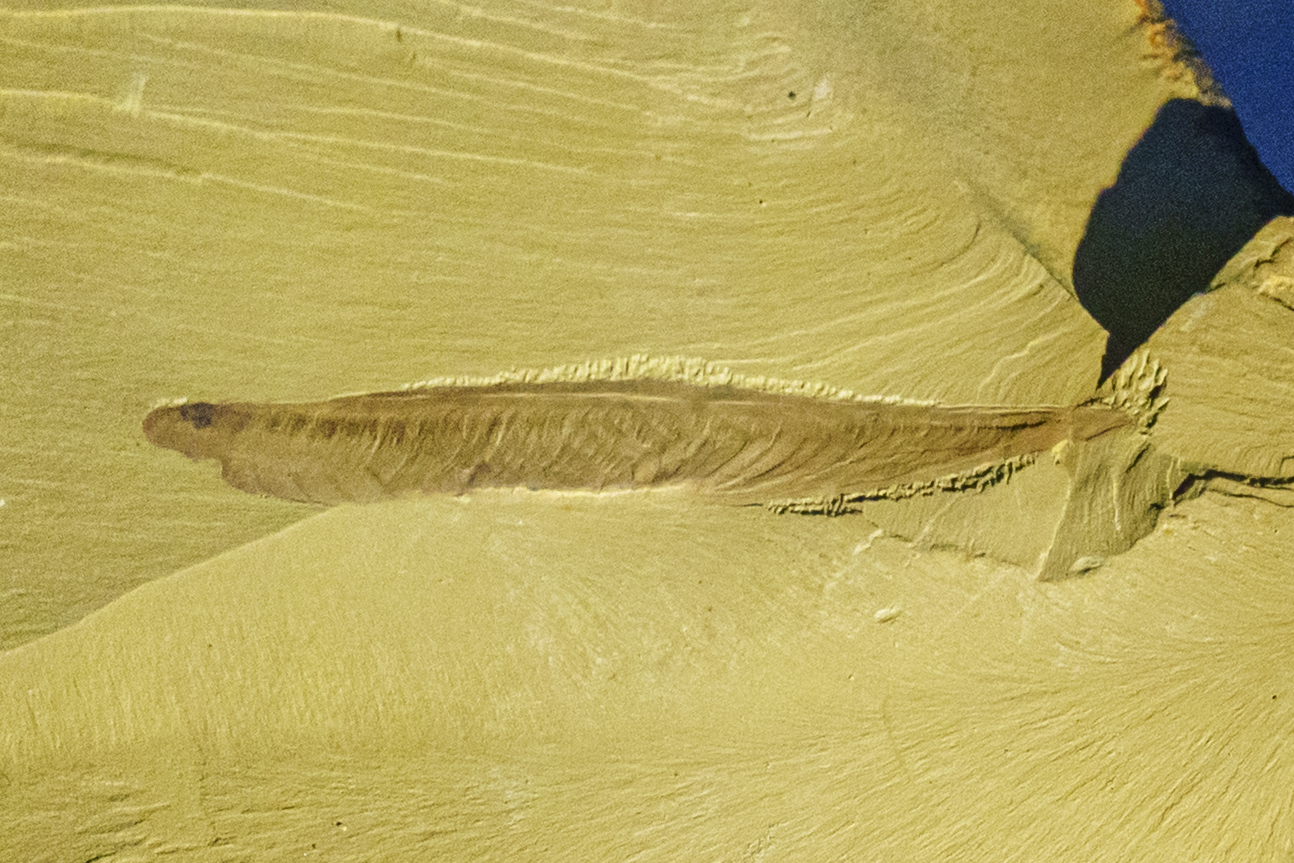
- Fossil

Scientific classification
- Kingdom: Animalia
- Phylum: Chordata
- Infraphylum: Agnatha
- Order: †Myllokunmingiida
- Family: †Myllokunmingiidae
- Genus: †Zhongjianichthys; Shu, 2003
- Species: †Z. rostratus

Binomial name
- †Zhongjianichthys rostratus Shu, 2003

= Zhongjianichthys =

Zhongjianichthys Temporal range: Cambrian Stage 3, 518 Ma

Extinct genus of jawless fishes

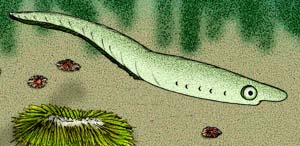
Restoration

Zhongjianichthys is an extinct genus of fish-like, stem-vertebrate chordate animal that lived in the Cambrian Period, approximately 518 million years ago, in what is now Southwest China. As a myllokunmingiid, it is considered one of the earliest known members of the vertebrate lineage in the fossil record alongside the other two identified genera, Haikouichthys and Myllokunmingia. Like its confamilials, its fossils were found in the Maotianshan Shales in Yunnan province.

The type species, Zhongjianichthys rostratus, is named after paleontologist Yang Zhongjian (1897-1979), who was widely honored as the "Father of Chinese Vertebrate Paleontology"; although the specific epithet rostratus means "beak-like" in Latin, Shu states in the describing paper that it is in reference to the rarity of the fossils.

== Description ==
Zhongjianichthys had a small, elongated, eel-like body. Notably, its head extends into a blunt, beak-like projection termed the antero-dorsal lobe, a feature also carried by Haikouichthys but it is smaller. Moreover, the eyes are located posteriorly to the antero-dorsal lobe relative to Haikouichthys. It also had thicker skin than Haikouichthys or Myllokunmingia, which is evidenced by the lack of visible myomeres.

The posterior positioning of its eyes and the thickness of its skin are considered to be advanced characters by Shu, contrasting the former with the anterior position of the eyes in Haikouichthys and the later Jamoytius being the primitive condition and comparing the latter with the condition of modern lampreys and hagfish, which have an epidermis consisting of multiple layers of cells versus the probable singular layer thereof in the other myllokunmingiids.

In comparison to Haikouichthys, it is similar in having large eyes, a pair of smaller structures near the eyes interpreted as nasal sacs — or, less likely, a pineal/parapineal complex (an identity that would later be confirmed in 2026 by Lei and colleagues in their study of specimens of Haikouichthys and indeterminate myllokunmingiids, who interpret them as an additional set of camera-type eyes), a singular nostril, a pair of rostral plates anterior to its antero-dorsal lobe, and a set of simple gill arches.

Possible vertebral elements have also been interpeted in the fossils.

== Taxonomy ==
Although generally accepted to be valid alongside the other two myllokunmingiid taxa, whether Zhongjianichthys is a distinct taxon is not entirely certain. Conway Morris and Caron in 2012 suggest that the lack of evident preservation of myomeres may actually be a taphonomic artifact and raise the possibility of Zhongjianichthys being synonymous with Haikouichthys. Similarly, Hou and colleages in 2017 suggest in their book, The Cambrian Fossils of Chengjiang, China, that all myllokunmingiid specimens referred to the three known taxa — including Zhongjianichthys — may be taphonomic variants of the same animal and use the name Myllokunmingia for all of them due to what they argue to be a lack of certainty in the reliability of the distinguishing characters between the three taxa.

== Paleoecology ==
Zhongjianichthys' elongated body and reduced fins suggest limited swimming ability, indicating a likely benthic lifestyle with intermittent burrowing.
