= Aschelminth =

Obsolete taxonomic group

The Aschelminthes (Aeschelminthes or Nemathelminthes), closely associated with the Platyhelminthes, are an obsolete phylum of pseudocoelomate and other similar animals that are no longer considered closely related and have been promoted to phyla in their own right. The term Aschelminth is now generally only used as an informal name for any member of the approximately ten different invertebrate phyla formerly included within Aschelminthes.

It is a polyphyletic group.

== Subdivisions ==
Although invertebrate experts do not necessarily agree on these categorizations, groups that are generally incorporated into Aschelminthes include:

- Gastrotricha

Gnathifera

- Acanthocephala
- Gnathostomulida
- Rotifera

Nematoidea

- Nematoda
- Nematomorpha

Scalidophora

- Kinorhyncha
- Loricifera
- Priapulida

In addition, Cycliophora, Entoprocta and Tardigrada are sometimes included.
