= Ubiquitin C-terminal hydrolase =

Ubiquitin C-terminal hydrolase may refer to the following enzymes:

- Ubiquitin carboxy-terminal hydrolase L1
- Ubiquitinyl hydrolase 1
