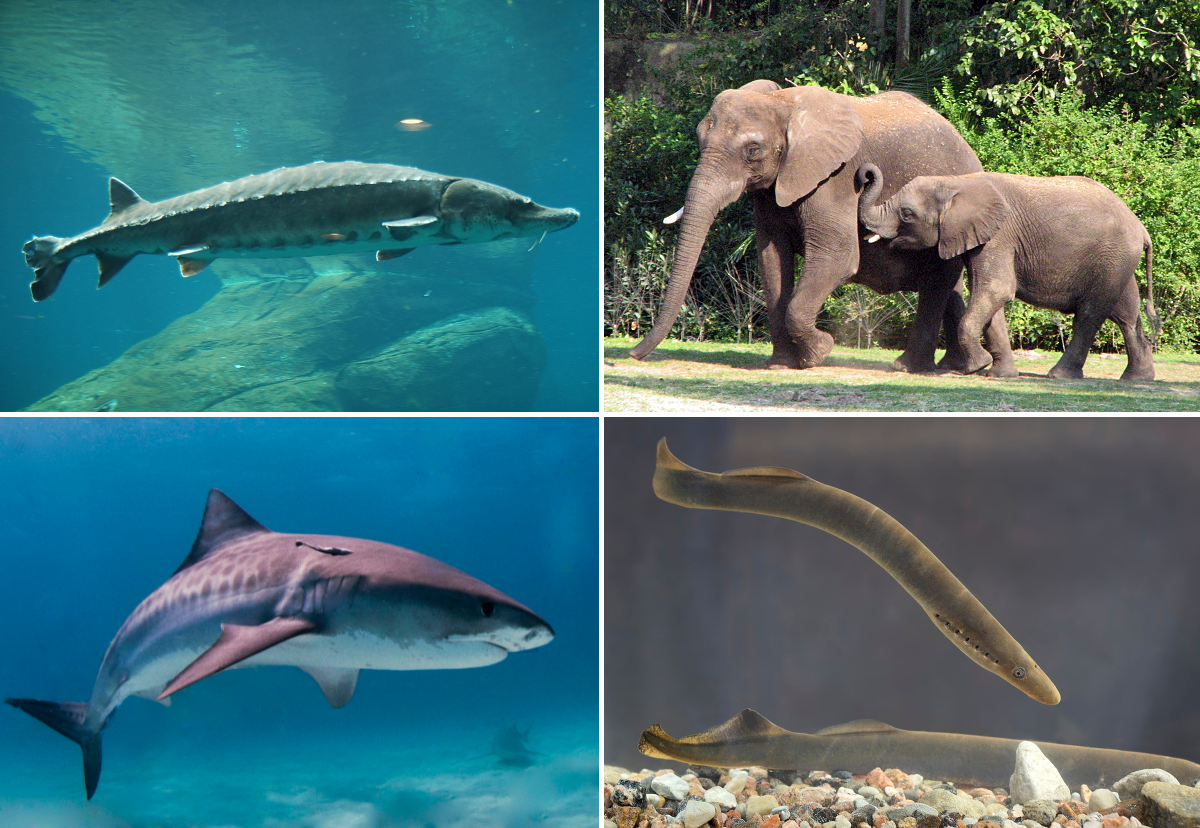
- Diversity: a sturgeon (Actinopterygii), an elephant (Tetrapoda), a shark (Chondrichthyes) and a lamprey (Cyclostomata).

Scientific classification
- Kingdom: Animalia
- Phylum: Chordata
- Clade: Olfactores
- Subphylum: Vertebrata; J-B. Lamarck, 1801

Major subgroups
- †Anaspidomorphi; †Conodonta?; †Galeaspida; †Osteostraci; †Pituriaspida; †Pteraspidomorphi; †Thelodonti; Cyclostomi; Gnathostomata (jawed vertebrates)

Synonyms
- Craniata Haeckel, 1866; Ossea Batsch, 1788

= Vertebrate =

Vertebrate Temporal range: Cambrian Stage 3–Present, 518–0 Ma

Subphylum of chordates

Vertebrates (/ˈvɜːrtəbrɪt, -ˌbreɪt/), also called craniates, are animals with a vertebral column and a cranium. The vertebral column surrounds and protects the spinal cord, while the cranium protects the brain.

The vertebrates make up the subphylum Vertebrata (/ˌvɜːrtəˈbreɪtə/ VUR-tə-BRAY-tə) with some 65,000 species, by far the largest ranked grouping in the phylum Chordata. The vertebrates include mammals, birds, amphibians, and various classes of fishes and reptiles. The two major living vertebrate subgroups are the jawless Cyclostomi (including hagfish and lampreys), and the jawed Gnathostomata. The jawed fish include both the cartilaginous fish and the bony fish. Bony fish include the lobe-finned fish, which gave rise to the tetrapods, the animals with four limbs. Despite their success, vertebrates still only make up less than five percent of all described animal species.

The first vertebrates appeared in the Cambrian explosion some 518 million years ago. The earliest fish were jawless, with the jawless fish collectively being grouped into "Agnatha". Jawed vertebrates evolved in the Ordovician or Silurian; bony fishes appeared in the Silurian and diversified widely in the Devonian. The first tetrapods appeared towards the end of the Devonian, and the first amphibians appeared on land in the Carboniferous. During the Triassic, mammals and dinosaurs appeared, the latter giving rise to birds in the Jurassic. Extant species are roughly equally divided between fishes of all kinds, and tetrapods. Populations of many species have been in steep decline since 1970 because of land-use change, overexploitation of natural resources, climate change, pollution and the impact of invasive species.

== Characteristics ==
=== Unique features ===
Vertebrates belong to Chordata, a phylum characterised by five synapomorphies (unique characteristics): namely a notochord, a hollow nerve cord along the back, a post-anal tail, an endostyle (present in vertebrates as the thyroid gland), and pharyngeal gills arranged in pairs. Vertebrates share these characteristics with other chordates.

Vertebrates are distinguished from all other animals, including other chordates, by multiple synapomorphies, namely: a vertebral column and a skull made of cartilage or bone; a brain divided into 3 or more sections; a muscular heart with 2 or more chambers; an inner ear with semicircular canals; camera-type eyes; a nose; kidneys with glomeruli; a thyroid; and a liver.

=== Physical ===
Idealised vertebrate body plan, showing key characteristics

Vertebrates (and other chordates) belong to the Bilateria, a group of animals with mirror symmetrical bodies. They move, typically by swimming, using muscles along the back, supported by a strong but flexible skeletal structure, the spine or vertebral column. The name 'vertebrate' derives from the Latin vertebratus, 'jointed', from vertebra, 'joint', in turn from Latin vertere, 'to turn'.

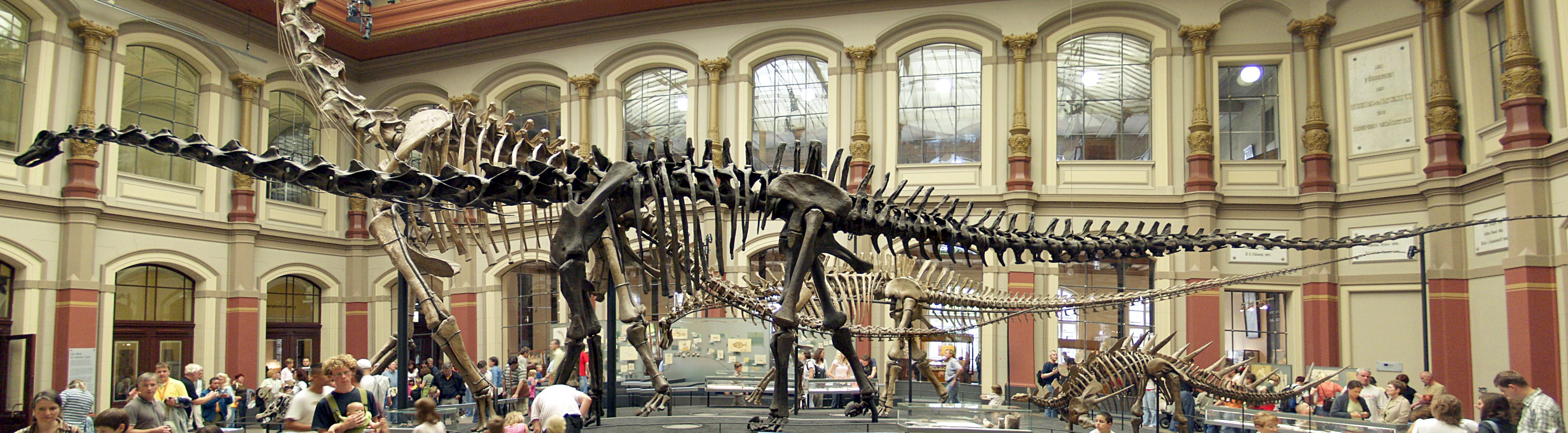
Fossilized skeleton (cast) of Diplodocus carnegii, showing an extreme example of the vertebral column that gives the vertebrates their name. The species is a tetrapod, its four legs adapting the fish-like body plan for walking on land. The specimen is 26 m (85 ft) long.

As embryos, vertebrates still have a notochord. In all but the jawless fishes, it is replaced with a vertebral column (made of bone or cartilage) during development. Vertebrate embryos have pharyngeal arches; in adult fish, these support the gills, while in adult tetrapods they develop into other structures.

In the embryo, a layer of cells along the back folds and fuses into a hollow neural tube. This develops into the spinal cord, and at its front end, the brain. The brain receives information about the world through nerves which carry signals from sense organs in the skin and body. Because the ancestors of vertebrates usually moved forwards, the front of the body encountered stimuli before the rest of the body, favouring cephalisation, the evolution of a head containing sense organs and a brain to process the sensory information.

Vertebrates have a tubular gut that extends from the mouth to the anus. The vertebral column typically continues beyond the anus to form an elongated tail.

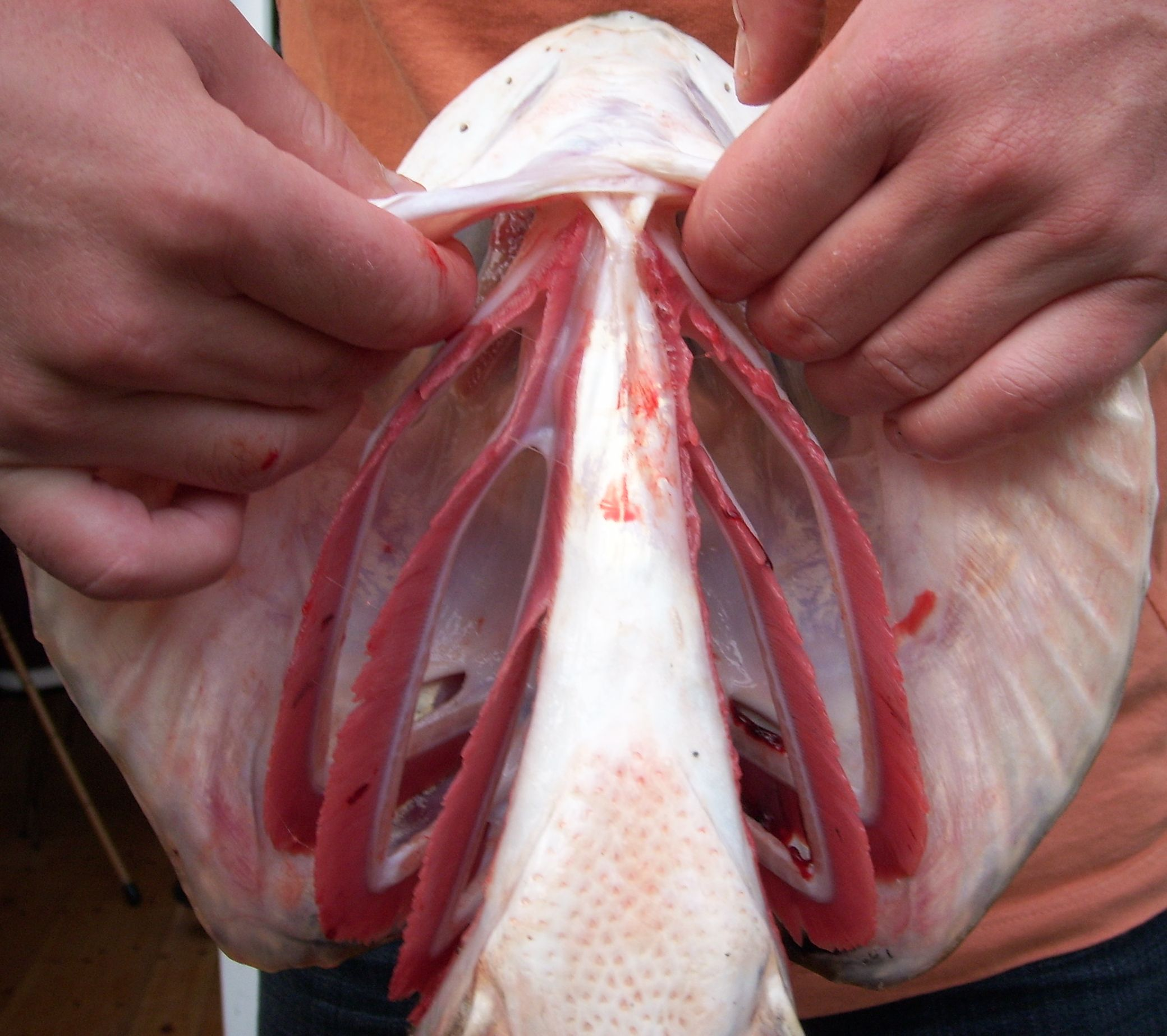
Branchial arches bearing gills in a pike

The ancestral vertebrates, and most extant species, are aquatic and carry out gas exchange in their gills. The gills are finely-branched structures which bring the blood close to the water. They are positioned just behind the head, supported by cartilaginous or bony branchial arches. In jawed vertebrates, the first gill arch pair evolved into the jaws. In amphibians and some primitive bony fishes, the larvae have external gills, branching off from the gill arches. Oxygen is carried from the gills to the body in the blood, and carbon dioxide is returned to the gills, in a closed circulatory system driven by a chambered heart. The kidneys filter the bloodstream, producing urine. The tetrapods have lost the gills of their fish ancestors; they have adapted the swim bladder (that fish use for buoyancy) into lungs to breathe air, and the circulatory system is adapted accordingly. At the same time, they adapted the bony fins of the lobe-finned fishes into two pairs of walking legs, carrying the weight of the body via the shoulder and pelvic girdles.

Vertebrates vary in size from the smallest frog species such as Brachycephalus pulex, with a minimum adult snout–vent length of 6.45 millimetres (0.254 in) to the blue whale, at up to 33 m (108 ft) and weighing some 150 tonnes.

=== Molecular ===
Molecular markers known as conserved signature indels in protein sequences have been identified and provide distinguishing criteria for the vertebrate subphylum. Five molecular markers are exclusively shared by all vertebrates and reliably distinguish them from all other animals; these include protein synthesis elongation factor-2, eukaryotic translation initiation factor 3, adenosine kinase and a protein related to ubiquitin carboxyl-terminal hydrolase). A specific relationship between vertebrates and tunicates is supported by two molecular markers, the proteins Rrp44 (associated with the exosome complex) and serine C-palmitoyltransferase. These are exclusively shared by species from these two subphyla, but not by cephalochordates.

== Evolutionary history ==
=== Cambrian explosion ===
The Cambrian Metaspriggina, c. 505 mya

Vertebrates originated during the Cambrian explosion at the start of the Paleozoic, which saw a rise in animal diversity. The earliest known vertebrates belong to the Chengjiang biota and lived about 518 million years ago. These include Haikouichthys, Myllokunmingia, and Zhongjianichthys (with these three genera possibly all actually representing a single species). Metaspriggina is another early vertebrate, known from the somewhat younger Burgess Shale of Canada, dating to around 505 million years ago. Unlike other Cambrian animals, these groups had the basic vertebrate body plan: a notochord, rudimentary vertebrae, and a well-defined head and tail, but lacked jaws. As such, one perspective is that Haikouichthys and other Myllokunmingiidae probably represent basal stem group craniates rather than actual vertebrates.

A vertebrate group of uncertain phylogeny, small eel-like conodonts, are known from microfossils of their paired tooth segments from the late Cambrian to the end of the Triassic. Zoologists have debated whether teeth mineralized first, given the hard teeth of the soft-bodied conodonts, and then bones, or vice versa, but it seems that the mineralized skeleton came first.

=== Paleozoic ===
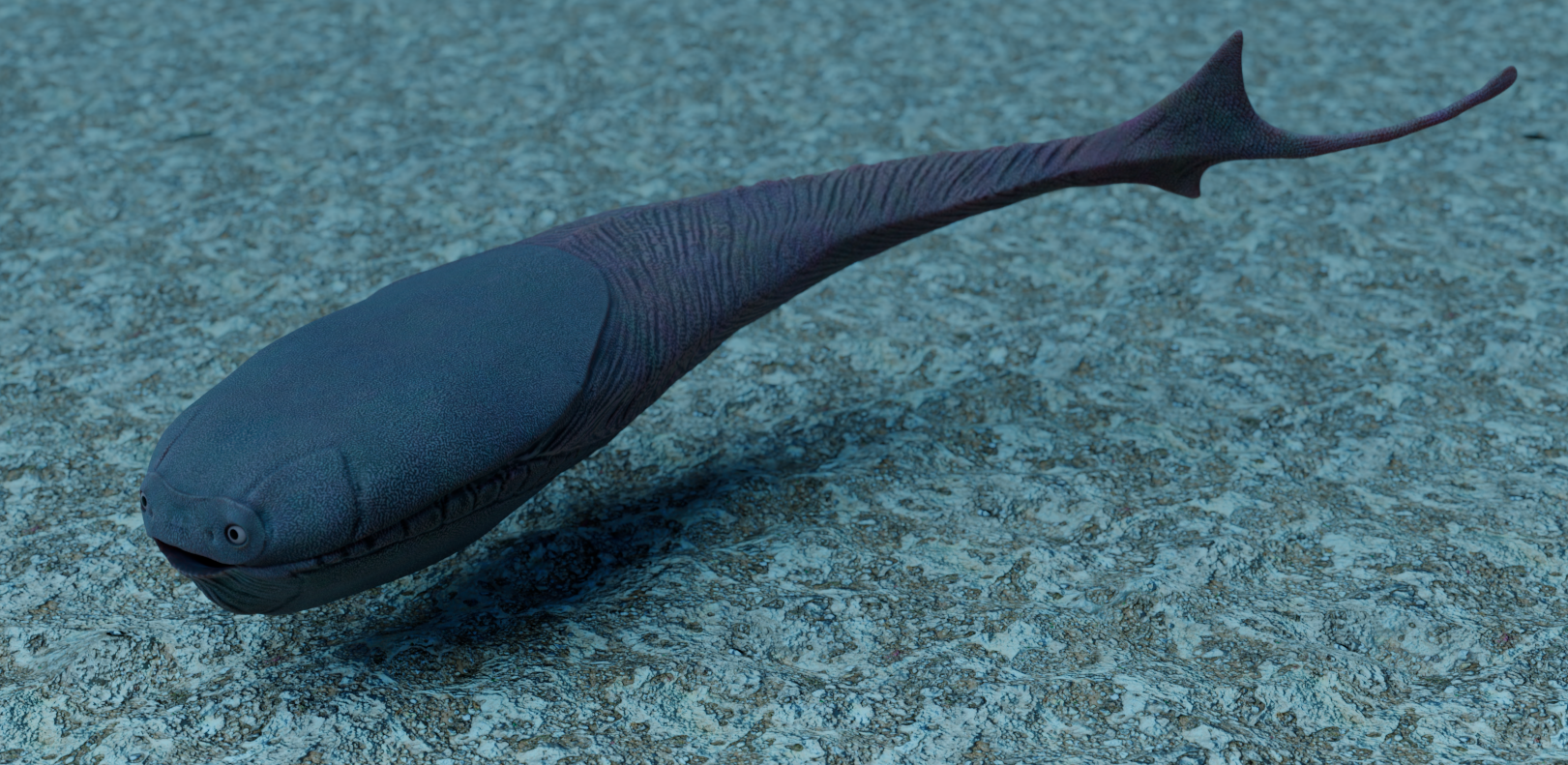
Life restoration of Sacabambaspis, a jawless Ordovician "ostracoderm" c. 460 mya

Acanthostega, a Devonian stem-tetrapod c. 365 mya

During the Ordovician, the armoured jawless "ostracoderms" rose to prominence, and remained the predominant groups of vertebrates until the Devonian. The first jawed vertebrates (which emerged within the "ostracoderms") may have appeared in the late Ordovician (~445 mya) or Silurian, and became common in the Devonian period, often known as the "Age of Fishes". The bony fishes appeared in the Silurian; they became common in the Devonian. Reaching a high point of diversity during the Early Devonian, "ostracoderms" subsequently declined, becoming extinct by the end of the period. By the middle of the Devonian, a lineage of bony fishes, the sarcopterygii, with both gills and air-breathing lungs adapted to life in swampy pools, used their muscular paired fins to propel themselves on land. The fins, already possessing bones and joints, evolved into the two pairs of walking legs of the first tetrapods in the Famennian stage of the Devonian. These tetrapods established themselves on land as amphibians in the next geological period, the Carboniferous. A group of vertebrates, the amniotes, with membranes around the embryo allowing it to survive on dry land, branched from amphibious tetrapods in the Carboniferous.

=== Mesozoic: Age of Dinosaurs ===
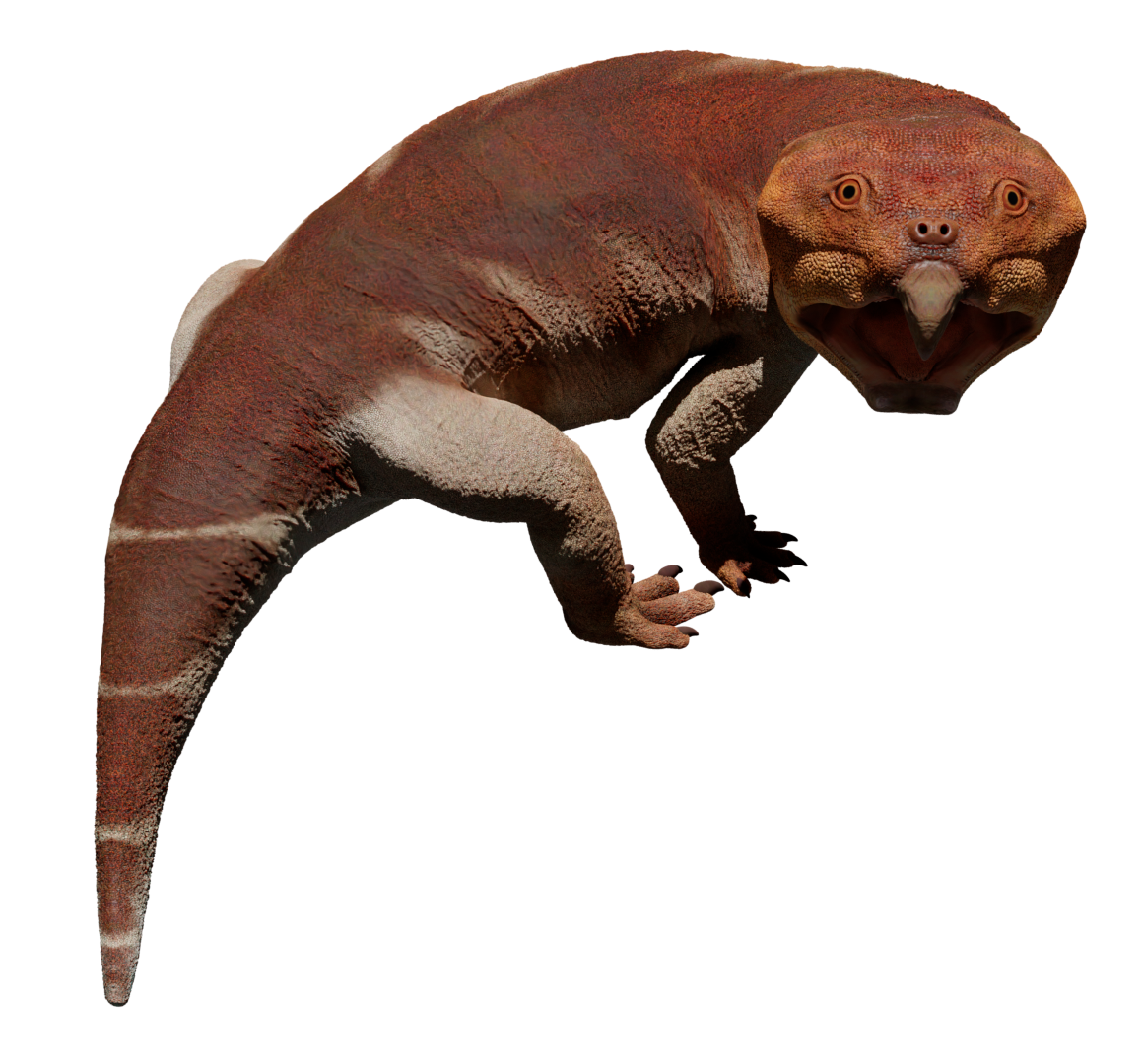
Hyperodapedon, a diapsid reptile of the Triassic, c. 230 mya

At the onset of the Mesozoic, all larger vertebrate groups were devastated after the largest mass extinction in earth history. The following recovery phase saw the emergence of many new vertebrate groups that are still around today, and this time has been described as the origin of modern ecosystems. On the continents, the ancestors of modern lissamphibians, turtles, crocodilians, lizards, and mammals appeared, as well as dinosaurs, which gave rise to birds later in the Mesozoic. In the seas, various groups of marine reptiles evolved, as did new groups of fish. At the end of the Mesozoic, another extinction event extirpated dinosaurs (other than birds) and many other vertebrate groups.

=== Cenozoic: Age of Mammals ===
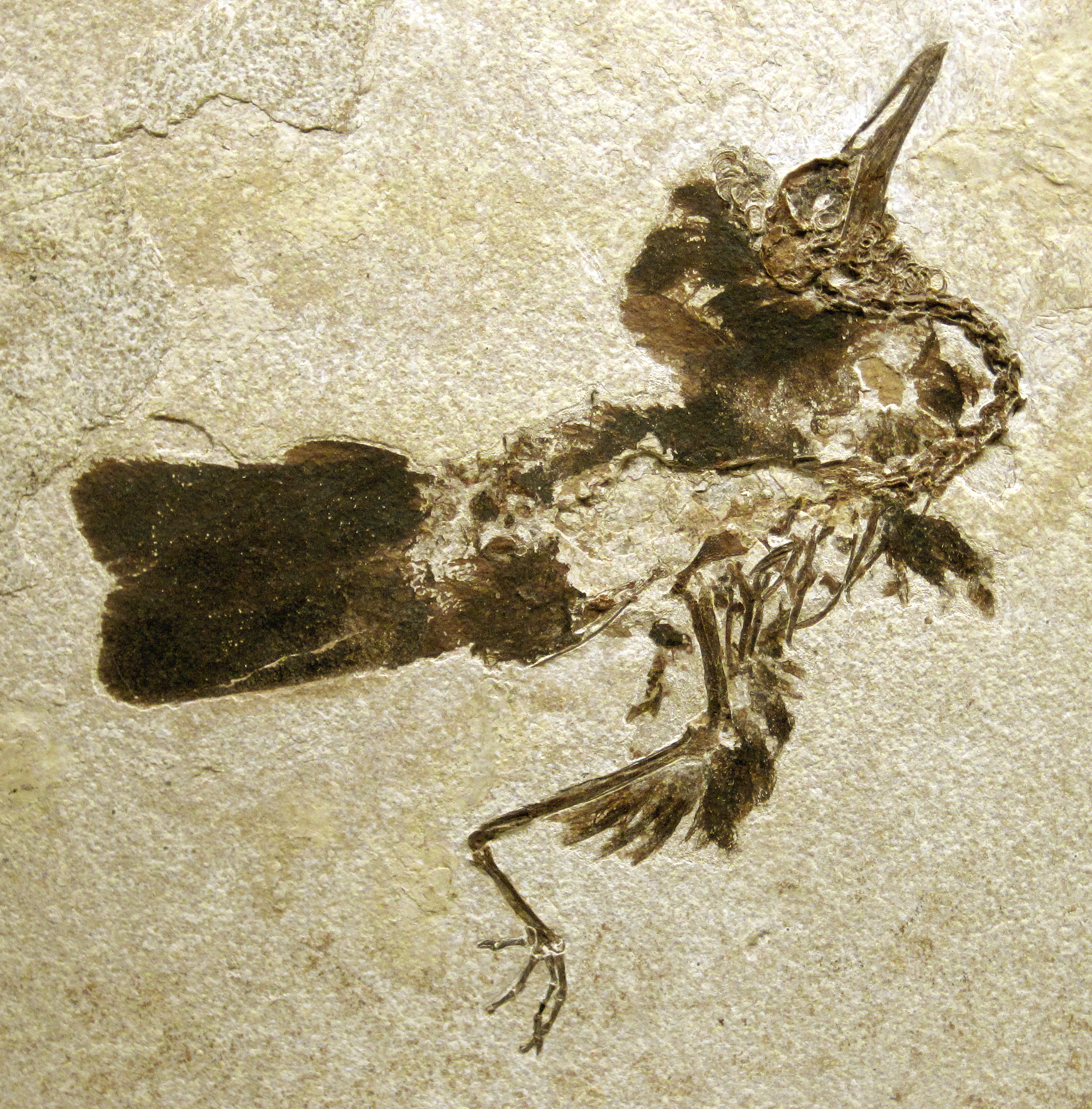
Nahmavis, an Eocene bird, c. 50 mya

The Cenozoic, the current era, is sometimes called the "Age of Mammals", because of the dominance of the terrestrial environment by that group. Placental mammals have predominantly occupied the Northern Hemisphere, with marsupial mammals in the Southern Hemisphere.

== Approaches to classification ==
=== Taxonomic history ===
==== Vertebrata ====
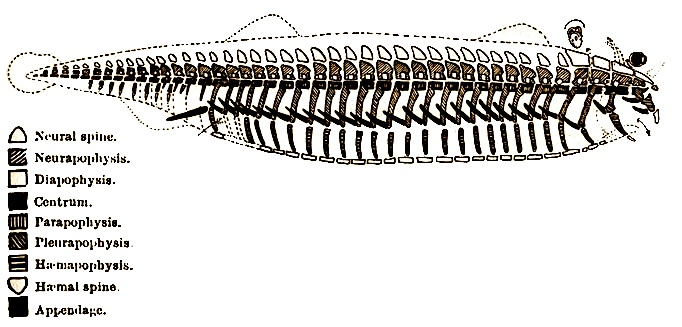
Sir Richard Owen's 1847 illustration of the archetypal vertebrate skeleton

In 1801, Jean-Baptiste Lamarck defined the vertebrates as a taxonomic group, a phylum distinct from the invertebrates he was studying. He described them as consisting of four classes, namely fish, reptiles, birds, and mammals, but treated the cephalochordates and tunicates as molluscs. In 1866, Ernst Haeckel called both his Craniata (vertebrates) and his Acrania (cephalochordates) Vertebrata. In 1877, Ray Lankester grouped the craniates, cephalochordates, and urochordates (tunicates) as Vertebrata. In 1880–1881, Francis Maitland Balfour placed the Vertebrata as a subphylum within the chordates. In 2018, Naoki Irie and colleagues proposed making Vertebrata a full phylum.

==== Cyclostomes and craniates ====
In 1758, Linnaeus classified hagfishes as Vermes, not vertebrates. In 1806, André Marie Constant Duméril grouped hagfishes and lampreys in the taxon Cyclostomi, characterized by horny teeth borne on a tongue-like apparatus, a large notochord as adults, and pouch-shaped gills (Marsupibranchii). The cyclostomes were seen as either degenerate cartilaginous fishes or primitive vertebrates. In 1889, Edward Drinker Cope coined the name Agnatha ("jawless") for a group that included the cyclostomes and fossil groups in which jaws could not be observed. Vertebrates were subsequently divided into two major sister-groups: the Agnatha and the Gnathostomata (jawed vertebrates). In 1927, Erik Stensiö suggested that the two groups of living agnathans (i.e. the cyclostomes) arose independently from fossil agnathans. In 1977, Søren Løvtrup argued that lampreys are more closely related to gnathostomes, based on characters such as radial muscles in the fins, true lymphocytes, neuromasts in the inner ear, and a cerebellum. This implied that Vertebrata and Craniata were distinct taxa. The validity of the taxon "Craniata" was examined in 2002 by Delarbre et al. using mtDNA sequencing, concluding that Myxini is more closely related to Hyperoartia than to Gnathostomata - i.e., that modern jawless fishes form a clade called Cyclostomata. This implies that Vertebrata should return to its old content (Gnathostomata + Cyclostomata) and the name Craniata is a junior synonym of Vertebrata. In 2010, the debate concluded when the French paleontologist Philippe Janvier stated that he accepted that both vertebrates and cyclostomes were monophyletic, and that "the intuitions of 19th century zoologists were correct in assuming that [cyclostomes] (notably, hagfishes) are strongly degenerate and have lost many characters over time."

=== Traditional taxonomy ===
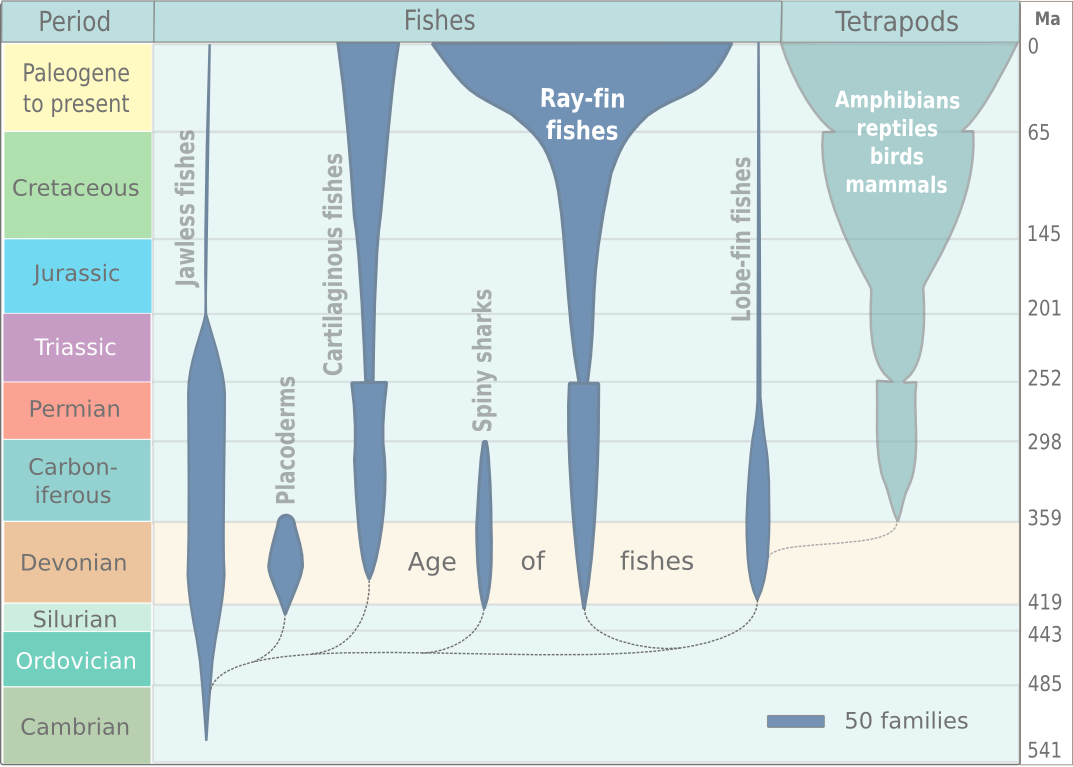
Diversity of various groups of vertebrates through the geologic ages. The width of the bubbles signifies the number of families.

Conventional evolutionary taxonomy groups extant vertebrates into seven classes based on traditional interpretations of gross anatomical and physiological traits. The commonly held classification lists three classes of fishes and four of tetrapods. This ignores some of the natural relationships between the groupings. For example, the birds derive from a group of reptiles, so "Reptilia" excluding Aves is not a natural grouping; it is described as paraphyletic and shown in quotation marks.

- Subphylum Vertebrata
  - Class "Agnatha" (jawless fishes)
  - Class Chondrichthyes (cartilaginous fishes)
  - Class Osteichthyes (bony fishes)
  - Class "Amphibia" (traditional amphibians)
  - Class "Reptilia" (reptiles)
  - Class Aves (birds)
  - Class Mammalia (mammals)

In addition to these, there are two classes of extinct armoured fishes, Placodermi and Acanthodii.

Other ways of classifying the vertebrates have been devised, particularly with emphasis on the phylogeny of early amphibians and reptiles. An example based on work by M.J. Benton in 2004 is given here († = extinct, "" = paraphyletic):

- Subphylum Vertebrata
  - Infraphylum "Agnatha" (lampreys and other jawless fishes)
    - Superclass †Anaspidomorphi (anaspids and relatives)
      - Class †Anaspida (anaspids)
    - Superclass Cyclostomata (cyclostomes)
      - Class Myxini (hagfish)
      - Class Petromyzontida (lampreys)
    - Class †Cephalaspidomorphi (cephalaspidomorphs)
    - Class †Conodonta (conodonts)
    - Class †Pteraspidomorpha (pteraspidomorphs)
    - Class †Thelodonti (thelodonts)
  - Infraphylum Gnathostomata (vertebrates with jaws)
    - Class †"Placodermi" (armoured fishes)
    - Class Chondrichthyes (cartilaginous fishes)
    - Class †"Acanthodii" (spiny 'sharks')
    - Osteichthyes (bony fishes)
      - Class Actinopterygii (ray-finned bony fishes)
      - "Sarcopterygii" (lobe-finned fishes, cladistically including the tetrapods)
        - Superclass Tetrapoda (four-limbed vertebrates)
          - Class "Amphibia" (amphibians, Lissamphibia)
          - Class Synapsida (mammals and their extinct relatives)
          - Class Sauropsida (modern reptiles and birds)
  - Incertae sedis
    - Genus †Nuucichthys
    - Genus †Palaeospondylus

While this traditional taxonomy is orderly, most of the groups are paraphyletic, meaning that the structure does not accurately reflect the natural evolved grouping. For instance, descendants of the first reptiles include modern reptiles, mammals and birds; the agnathans have given rise to the jawed vertebrates; the bony fishes have given rise to the land vertebrates; a group of amphibians, the labyrinthodonts, have given rise to the reptiles (traditionally including the mammal-like synapsids), which in turn have given rise to the mammals and birds. Most scientists working with vertebrates use a classification based purely on phylogeny, organized by their known evolutionary history.

=== External phylogeny ===
The closest relatives of vertebrates have been debated over the years. It was once thought that the Cephalochordata was the sister taxon to Vertebrata. This group, Notochordata, was taken to be sister to the Tunicata. Since 2006, analysis has shown that the tunicates + vertebrates form a clade, the Olfactores, with Cephalochordata as its sister (the Olfactores hypothesis), as shown in the following phylogenetic tree.

- Chordata
  - Cephalochordata
    Leptocardii (lancelets)
  - Olfactores
    - Tunicata (sea squirts, etc)
    - Vertebrata

=== Internal phylogeny ===
The internal phylogeny of extant vertebrates is shown in the tree.

- Vertebrata (backbone)
  - Agnatha (Note: Agnatha as traditionally defined is paraphyletic, that is, a taxon including all jawless fishes, but if one only includes living species then the group becomes monophyletic and equivalent to Cyclostomi.) (jawless)
  - Gnathostomata (jawed)
    - Chondrichthyes (cartilaginous)
    - Osteichthyes (bony fishes)
      - - Actinopterygii (ray‑fins)
        - Sarcopterygii (lobe‑fins)
          - Coelacanths
          - Rhipidistia (lungs)
            - Lungfishes
            - Tetrapoda (4 limbs)
              - Amphibians
              - Amniota (amnion)
                - Mammals
                - Sauropsida (scaly skin)
                  - Lepidosaurs
                  - - Turtles
                    - - Crocodilians
                      - Dinosaurs

The placement of hagfishes within the vertebrates has been controversial. Their lack of proper vertebrae (among other characteristics of jawless lampreys and jawed vertebrates) led authors of phylogenetic analyses based on morphology to place them outside Vertebrata. Molecular data however indicates that they are vertebrates, being most closely related to lampreys. An older view is that they are a sister group of vertebrates in the common taxon of Craniata. In 2019, Tetsuto Miyashita and colleagues reconciled the two types of analysis, supporting the Cyclostomata hypothesis using only morphological data.

A wider issue is the position of fossil agnathans, such as the Myllokunmingiida. Tetsuto Miyashita and colleagues in 2019 place them tentatively as part of the Vertebrata total group, outside the Vertebrata crown group that led to all extant vertebrates. These fossils have a cranium (a skull of bone or cartilage) but at most a rudimentary vertebral column, so they can be viewed as part of a craniate clade that also includes the crown group vertebrates which possess a full vertebral column.

Cladogram of Vertebrata focusing on jawless fish after Reeves and colleagues (2023):

- Vertebrata total group
  - †Haikouella
  - - †Metaspriggina
    - †Myllokunmingiida
    - Vertebrata crown group
      - Cyclostomi total group
        - †Anaspida
          - †Birkeniida
          - - †Lasanius
            - - †Jamoytius
              - †Euphanerops
        - - †Euconodonta
          - Cyclostomi crown group
            - Myxinoidea
            - Petromyzontida
      - Gnathostomata total group
        - †Pteraspidomorphi
          - †Astraspis
          - - †Arandaspida
            - †Heterostraci
        - - †Thelodonti
            - †Furcacaudiformes
            - †Thelodontiformes
          - - †Pituriaspida
            - - †Galeaspida
              - - †Osteostraci
                - Gnathostomata (traditional usage)
                  - †Antiarchi
                  - - †Arthrodira
                    - Gnathostomata crown group
                      - Osteichthyes
                      - Chondrichthyes

== Diversity ==
=== Species by group ===
Described and extant vertebrate species are split roughly evenly but non-phylogenetically between non-tetrapod "fish" and tetrapods. The following table lists the number of described extant species for each vertebrate class as estimated in the IUCN Red List of Threatened Species, 2014.3. Paraphyletic groups are shown in quotation marks.

Vertebrate groups			Image	Class	Estimated number of described species	Group totals
Anamniote lack amniotic membrane so need to reproduce in water	Jawless	"Fish"		Myxini (hagfish)	78	>32,900
Anamniote lack amniotic membrane so need to reproduce in water	Jawless	"Fish"		Hyperoartia (lampreys)	40	>32,900
Anamniote lack amniotic membrane so need to reproduce in water	Jawed	"Fish"		Chondrichthyes	>1,100	>32,900
Anamniote lack amniotic membrane so need to reproduce in water	Jawed	"Fish"		Actinopterygii	>32,000	>32,900
Anamniote lack amniotic membrane so need to reproduce in water	Jawed	"Fish"		"Sarcopterygii"	8	>32,900
Anamniote lack amniotic membrane so need to reproduce in water	Jawed	Tetrapods		Amphibia	7,302	33,278
Amniote have amniotic membrane adapted to reproducing on land	Jawed	Tetrapods		"Reptilia"	10,711	33,278
Amniote have amniotic membrane adapted to reproducing on land	Jawed	Tetrapods		Mammalia	5,513	33,278
Amniote have amniotic membrane adapted to reproducing on land	Jawed	Tetrapods		Aves (birds)	10,425	33,278
Total described species						66,178

The IUCN estimates that 1,305,075 extant invertebrate species have been described, which means that less than 5% of the described animal species in the world are vertebrates.

=== Recent population trends ===
The Living Planet Index, following 16,704 populations of 4,005 species of vertebrates, shows a decline of 60% between 1970 and 2014. Since 1970, freshwater species declined 83%, and tropical populations in South and Central America declined 89%. The authors note that "An average trend in population change is not an average of total numbers of animals lost." According to WWF, this could lead to a sixth major extinction event. The five main causes of biodiversity loss are land-use change, overexploitation of natural resources, climate change, pollution and invasive species. A few species of vertebrates (mainly humans and livestock used by humans) have seen explosive growth in the recent centuries while wild species shrink in total population and biomass.

== See also ==
- Marine vertebrate – Marine animals with a vertebrate column
- Taxonomy of the vertebrates (Young, 1962) – 1962 classification system

== Bibliography ==
- Kardong, Kenneth V. (1998). Vertebrates: Comparative Anatomy, Function, Evolution (second ed.). USA: McGraw-Hill. pp. 747 pp. ISBN 978-0-697-28654-3.
- "Vertebrata". Integrated Taxonomic Information System.
