= Myomere =

Blocks of skeletal muscle tissue in aquatic chordates

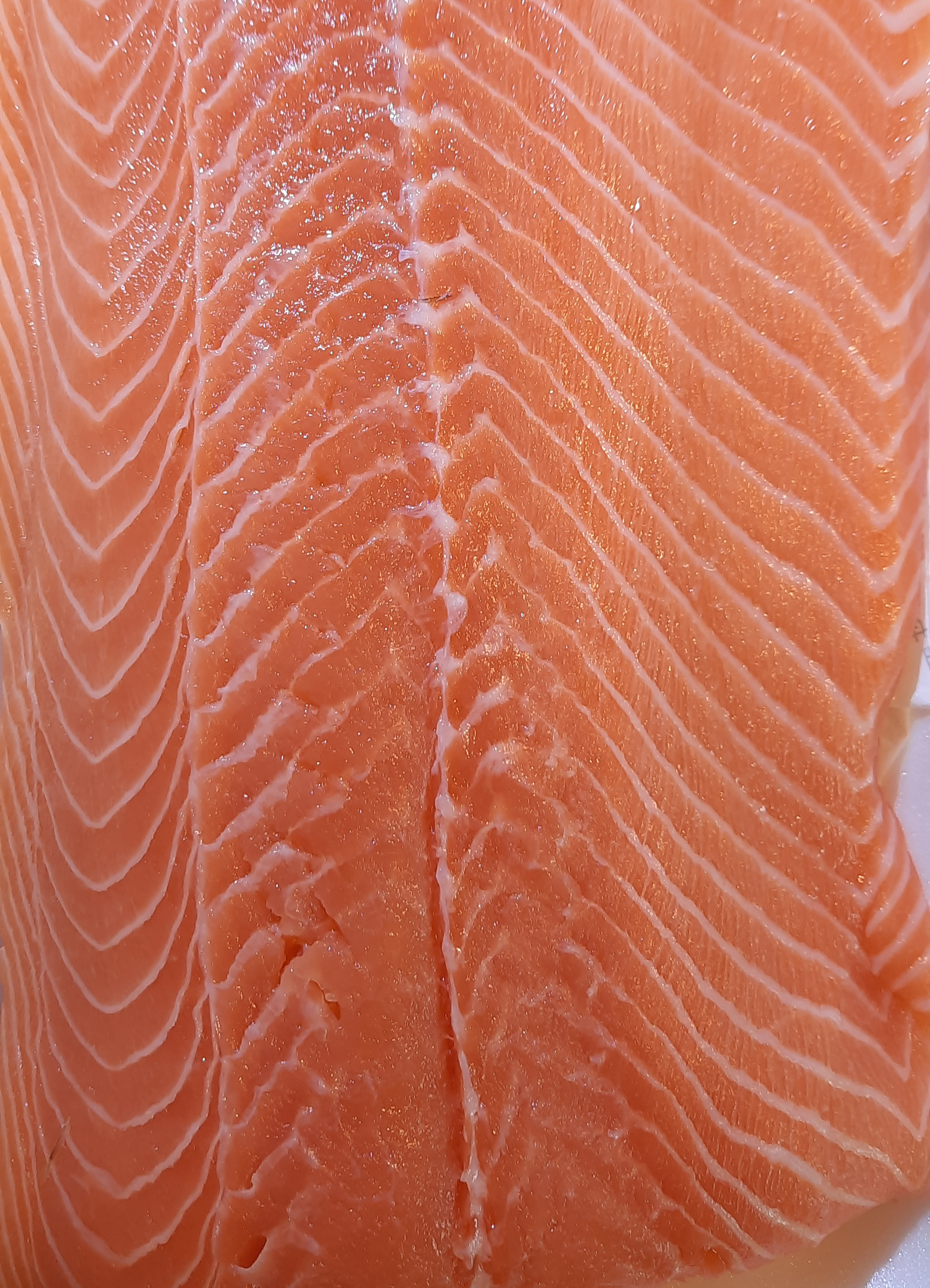
Filet of salmon showing the zig-zagging pattern of its myomeres. The white fascia divides each myomere from its neighbors

Myomeres are blocks of skeletal muscle tissue arranged in sequence, commonly found in aquatic chordates. Myomeres are separated from adjacent myomeres by fascia consisting of connective tissue, known as myosepta. Myomere counts are sometimes used for identifying specimens using meristics, since their number corresponds to the number of vertebrae in the adults. Myomere location varies, with some species containing these only near the tails, while some have them located near the scapular or pelvic girdles. Depending on the species, myomeres could be arranged in an epaxial or hypaxial manner; hypaxial refers to ventral muscles (those of the "stomach" region) and related structures, while epaxial refers to more dorsal muscles (those of the "back"). The horizontal septum divides these two regions in vertebrates from cyclostomes (jawless lamprey and hagfish) to gnathostomes (jawed fish). In terrestrial chordates, which are gnathostomes themselves, the myomeres become fused as well as indistinct, due to the disappearance of myosepta.

== Anatomy ==
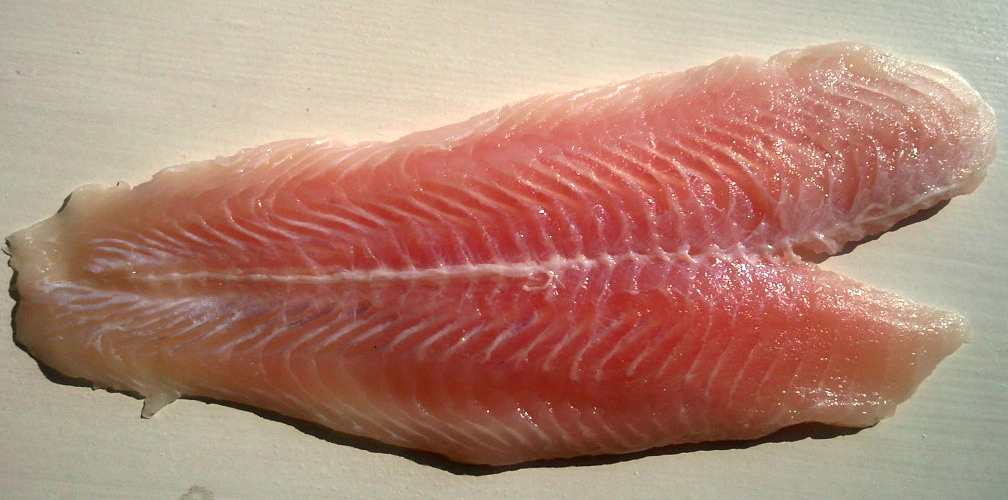
Fillet of iridescent shark showing the zig-zag of myomeres

Myomeres are overlapping "cones" of muscle fibers bound by connective tissue. The shape of myomeres varies by species. Myomeres are commonly zig-zaged, being stacks or lines of muscle fibers shaped like "V" (lancelets), "W" (fishes), or straight (tetrapods). Generally, cyclostome myomeres are arranged in vertical strips while those of jawed fishes are folded in a complex manner due to their derived nature and evolution of advanced swimming capability. Specifically, myomeres of elasmobranchs and eels are W-shaped, while the myomeres of tetrapods, such as mudpuppies, run vertically and do not display complex folding. Myomeres overlap each other in succession, meaning myomere activation also allows neighboring myomeres to activate. They are innervated by spinal nerves, which pass into each myomere.

Myomeres are made up of myoglobin-rich dark muscle as well as white muscle. Dark muscles generally function as slow-twitch muscle fibers while white muscle is composed of fast-twitch fibers.

In gnathostomes, the myomeres are separated by myoseptal tendons. Specifically, these are the myorhabdoid tendons, the lateral tendons, the epineural tendon, and the epipleural tendon.

== Function ==
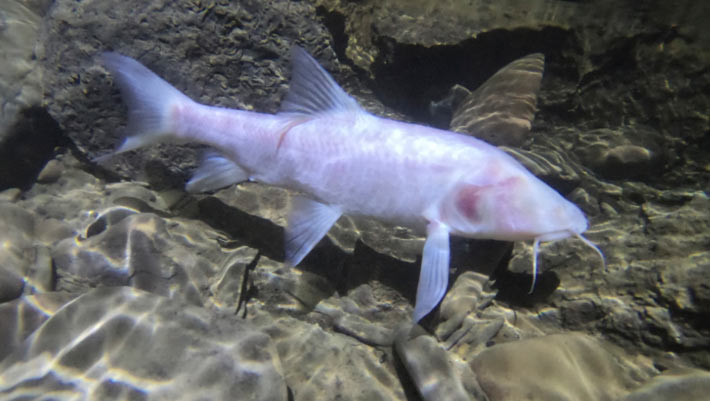
Gnathostome cavefish, like this mahseer (Neolissochilus pnar) have myomeres visible through their translucent skin

There are three types of myomeres observed in fish-like chordates: amphioxine (lancelet), cyclostomine (jawless fish), and gnathostomine (jawed fish). All myomeres flex the body laterally into concavity to provide force for locomotion. Since myomeres are composed of multinucleated myofibers (contractile cells), force can be generated via muscle contraction that gets transmitted by the intricate connective tissue (myosepta) network.

Myomeres compose most of the lateral musculature and provide propulsive force to travel along the line of travel. In this sense, they cause flexion to either side in order to produce locomotor force (the forward swimming motion). Myomeres attach to centra of vertebrae, and neural and haemal spines. The folded shape of each myomere as V- or W-shaped extends over various axial segments, allowing fibers control over a large amount of the body.

There are different variations of myomere activation depending on the type of swimming or movement. For example, high loading situations such as fast-starts and turning require almost maximal myomere activation in teleost fish. Further, if swim speeds are lower and movement is in one plane, there is less activation of myomeres. Research has discovered that fish are able to spatially restrict axial myomeres during different swimming behaviors.

Some research theorizes that myomeres play additional roles for fish beyond force generation in swimming; microdissection and polarized light microscopy research suggests that anterior myomeres have elongated and reinforced dorsal posterior cones that allow epaxial muscle force to be transmitted to the neurocranium for its elevation, which is a crucial part of suction feeding.

== Evolution ==
=== Basal chordates ===
Published information on Pikaia gracilens (a well-known Cambrian fossil) explains evolution of swimming ability in chordates related to myomere shape and function. Specifically, myomeres in this species possessed minimal overlap between successive ones and myosepta dividing them were gently curved. In a biomechanical evaluation, it is presumed that Pikaia were not capable of rapid swimming like in living chordates. Several theories for this idea include lacking fast-twitch muscle fibers, ancestral muscle fiber types more like modern slow-twitch fibers, and less tension on myosepta due to less overlap between successive myomeres.

In amphioxus, myomeres run longitudinally along the length of the body in a "V"-shape. As sequential contraction for swimming occurs, force from the myomeres is transmitted via connective tissues to the notochord.

=== Cyclostomata ===
In cyclostomes, the myosepta are W-shaped. In the lampreys, but not the hagfishes, myorhabdoid tendons are present. Other myoseptal tendons are absent in cyclostomes.

=== Teleosts ===
==== Zebrafish ====
Being model organisms, zebrafish myomeres have been extensively studied. The tail-bending maneuver generated by myomeres in zebrafish requires innervation from motor neurons for both the hypaxial and epaxial muscle regions. It has been found that timing/intensity of neurons firing in these two regions varies, respectively. This process is mediated by a circuit that controls motor neuron activation during swimming behaviors, which, in turn, affects force generation. Similar to this idea, one study found that hypaxial and epaxial myomere activation did not always correlate with myomeric fibers closer to the horizontal septum itself.

==== Eels ====
Eel myomeres are W-shaped and cover the entire body. Within these is a mucosal-like matrix that is acellular. Superficial to these myomeres is an epithelial layer. Leptocephalus myomeres are also W-shaped and extend from head all the way to the tail. Distinguishing eels can be done through evaluation of the number of myomeres (European has 112-119 while American has 103–11).

=== Chondrichthyes ===
The myomeres of some Chondrichthyes, specifically sharks, are W-shaped. Thus, function in Chondrichthyes is similar to that of bony fish, where myomeres contribute to propulsive force for locomotion.

=== Tetrapods ===
The myomeres of tetrapods run vertically and do not undergo folding like in bony fishes. Further, in higher order vertebrates, myomeres are fused and run longitudinally. Myosepta are not present in amniotes as amniote muscles are arranged differently.

In salamanders, hypaxial muscles, myomeres, and myosepta run in a straight line mid-laterally to mid-ventrally. Specifically, the orientation of collagen fibers within these myomeres runs mediolateral. It is also theorized that, in salamanders, myosepta increase the amplification of strain of angled muscle fibers. This controls how myomeres bulge during contraction in what is called the 'bulge control hypothesis'. Salamanders in the genus Necturus (mudpuppies) are a salamander species with simply-lain myomeres, unlike the complex nature of bony fishes.

Myomeres also play a role in swimming in adult newts. Specifically, epaxial myomeres located opposite to each other at the same longitudinal site alternate rhythmic contraction. During stepping on the ground, the myomeres of the mid-trunk undergo bursts of contraction that are synchronized in contrast to double bursting patterns (in opposite directions) expressed in the anterior and posterior trunks.

== Ossified myosepta ==
In some taxa, the myoseptal tendons undergo ossification. This occurs in many teleosts, as well as pachycephalosaurid dinosaurs.
