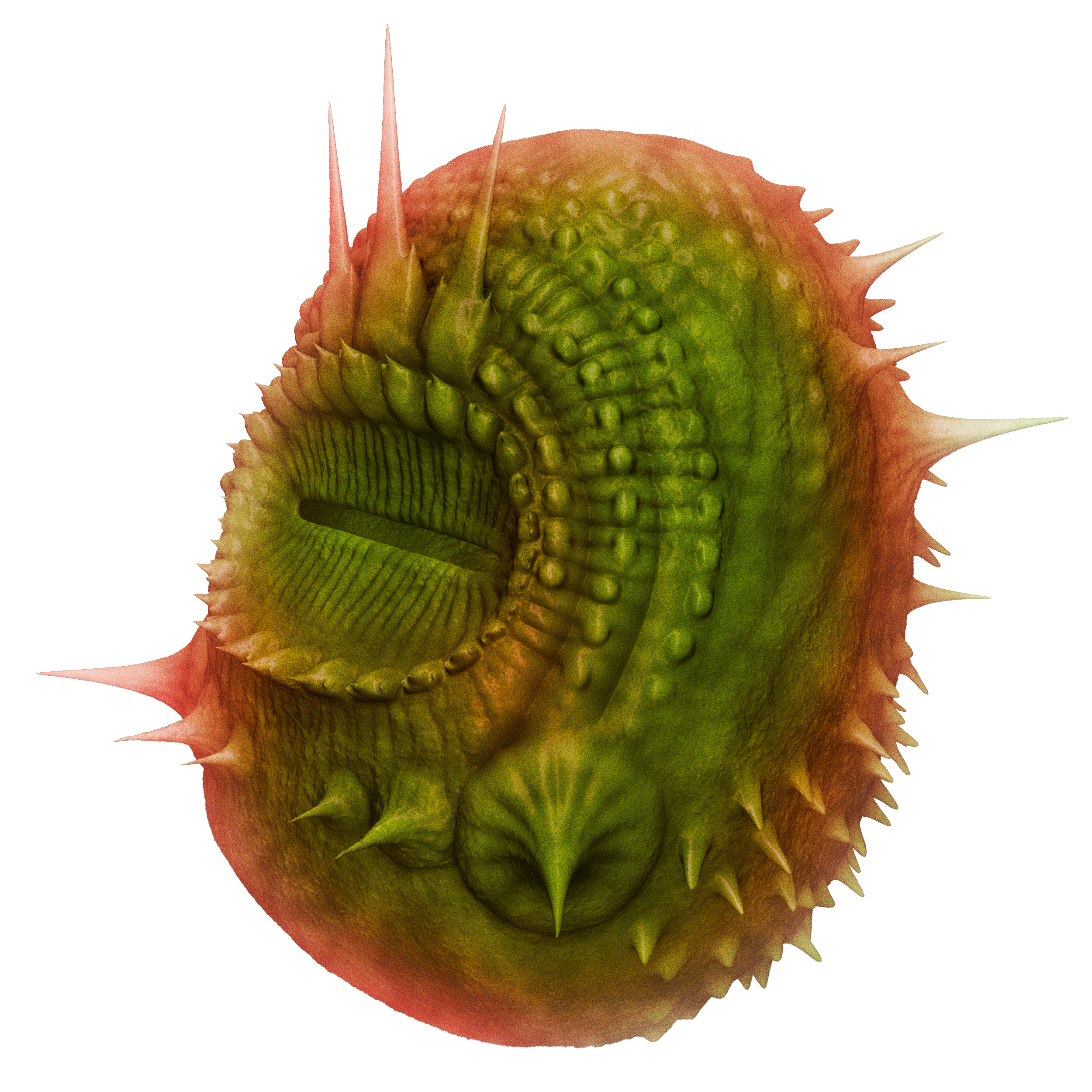
- Reconstruction of Saccorhytus coronarius

Scientific classification
- Kingdom: Animalia
- Superphylum: Ecdysozoa
- Phylum: †Saccorhytida
- Family: †Saccorhytidae; Han et al., 2017
- Genus: †Saccorhytus; Han et al., 2017
- Species: †S. coronarius

Binomial name
- †Saccorhytus coronarius Han et al., 2017

= Saccorhytus =

Saccorhytus Temporal range: Fortunian

Extinct genus of Cambrian ecdysozoan

Saccorhytus (from Latin saccus "bag" and Ancient Greek ῥύτις rhytis "wrinkle") is an extinct genus of animal possibly belonging to the superphylum Ecdysozoa, and it is represented by a single species, Saccorhytus coronarius (from Latin attributive coronarius "[of a] crown"). The organism lived approximately 540 million years ago in the beginning of the Cambrian period. Initially proposed as a deuterostome, which would have made it the oldest known species of this superphylum, it has since been determined to belong to a protostome group called the ecdysozoans.

Fossils of the species were first discovered in the Kuanchuanpu Formation of Shaanxi province of China by a team of scientists from the United Kingdom, China and Germany, and the findings were first published in January 2017.

A 2024 paper suggested it may instead be the non-feeding larva of a scalidophoran, tentatively linking it to Eokinorhynchus due to their shared bilateral sclerites. However, a 2025 paper refutes this, again proposing that Saccorhytida is a distinct group of stem-ecdysozoans and also suggesting Eolarva may be intermediate between saccorhytids and crown-group ecdysozoans.

== Description ==
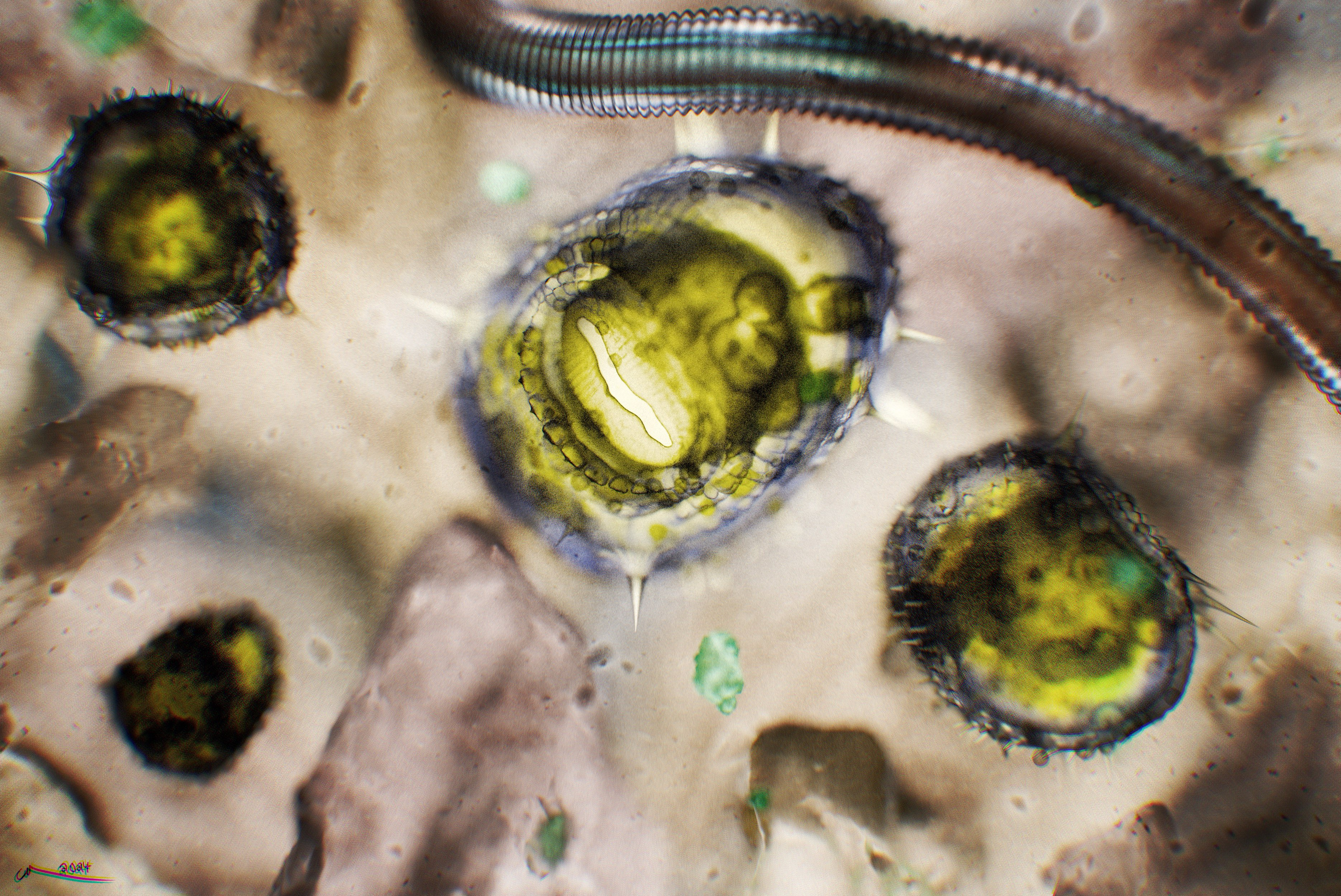
Life restoration of Saccorhytus as it may have been seen through the lens of a microscope, living among grains of sand.

Saccorhytus was only about a millimetre (1.3 mm) in size and is characterised by its globular or hemispherical body with a prominent mouth. Its body was covered by a thick but flexible cuticle. Surrounding its mouth, itself lined with integumental folds, is a ring of tridentate protuberances. Above this ring is another set of tridentate spines, which vary in number between one and five, possibly reflecting ontogenetic or intraspecific differences. It had three nodulate ridges above its mouth. Below its mouth were three pairs of sclerotized spines, termed "body cones", with the distal pair being the largest. A further five pairs of these spines are found elsewhere on the body, with a cluster of three on each lateral side, and two more pairs on the back - these final two pairs are not present in all specimens, suggesting some ontogenetic or intraspecific variation. These body cone spines may have served a defensive or sensory function. On the back of the animal were many smaller spines, distinct from the body cones, with apparently random organization.

There is no evident anus, which means that the animal must have consumed its food and excreted it from the same orifice. However, the strong folding found in the fossils makes this conclusion tentative, with Simon Conway Morris, one of the British scientists involved in its discovery, admitting the possibility that the team simply has not spotted it.

== Phylogeny ==
- - Protostomes
  - Deuterostomes
    - Ambulacrarians
    - Chordates
    - - Saccorhytus coronarius
      - - Vetulocystids
        - Vetulicolians

An outdated phylogenetic tree simplified from Han et al. showing the now-disproven deuterostome hypothesis.

Saccorhytus was initially classified as a deuterostome due to its possession of what appeared to be pharyngeal openings in the form of its body cones. These cones were originally thought to be open, making them appear similar to apparently equivalent structures in vetulicolians and vetulocystids. It has since been determined that the apparent pharyngeal openings were taphonomic artifacts where sclerites and posterial spines had been broken off.

Instead, Sacchorhytus is believed to be an ecdysozoan, possibly a stem group scalidophoran, due to the lack of cillia and to its sclerites and posterial spines being similar to that of other scalidophorans. This theory has since been supported by later phylogenetic analysis.

Below is a simplified phylogenetic tree based on this classification, with dashed lines showing uncertain placements:

- - Deuterostomia
  - Protostomia
    - Spiralia
    - Ecdysozoa
      - Saccorhytus coronarius?
      - - Cycloneuralia
          - - Saccorhytus coronarius?
            - Scalidophora
          - Nematoida
        - Panarthropoda

== Palaeoecology ==
Saccorhytus most likely lived a meiofaunal lifestyle, with its body plan suited for an interstitial habitat, such as its thick but flexible cuticle providing protection and allowing it to wriggle through grains of sand. Additionally, it is possible that muscles could have attached to the body cone spines, allowing them to be used for locomotion.
