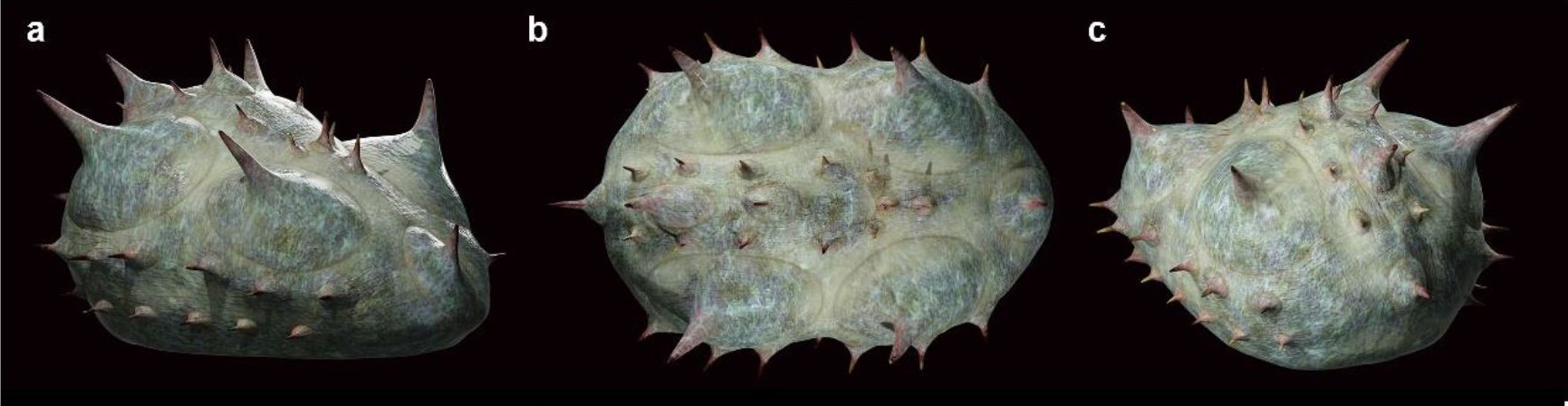
- Reconstruction

Scientific classification
- Kingdom: Animalia
- Clade: Protostomia
- Superphylum: Ecdysozoa
- Phylum: †Saccorhytida
- Genus: †Beretella
- Species: †B. spinosa

Binomial name
- †Beretella spinosa Wang et al. 2024

= Beretella =

Beretella Temporal range: 529 Ma

Extinct genus of ecdysozoan

Beretella is a genus of extinct ecdysozoan in the phylum Saccorhytida. It is the second genus of its phylum to be described, after the early Cambrian Saccorhytus. It is from the early Cambrian Yanjiahe Formation, 529 million years ago.
