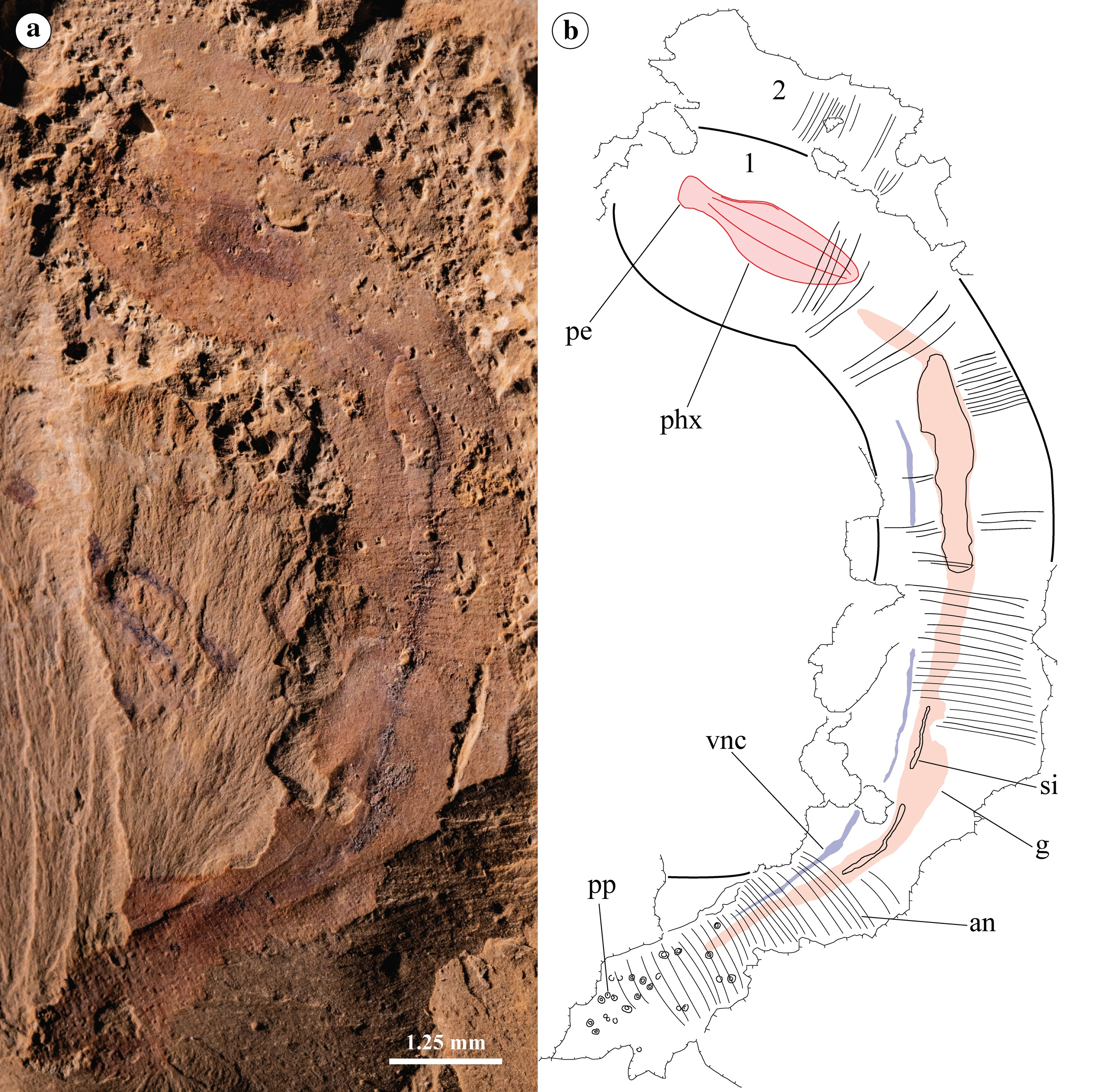
- Fossil specimen

Scientific classification
- Kingdom: Animalia
- Superphylum: Ecdysozoa
- Genus: †Acosmia; Chen & Zhoi 1997
- Species: †A. maotiania

Binomial name
- †Acosmia maotiania Chen & Zhoi 1997

= Acosmia =

Acosmia Temporal range: Cambrian Stage 3

Genus of ecdysozoans

Acosmia is an extinct genus of marine worm from the Cambrian aged Chengjiang biota of Yunnan, China. It is represented by a single rare species, Acosmia maotiania, that reached 4.5 cm in length and 9 mm in width. It was likely a burrowing animal that fed by deposit feeding. While originally suggested it to be a priapulid (penis worm), a 2020 study proposed to be a stem-group ecdysozoan, due to lacking the radial pharygneal armature that characterises modern ecdysozoans, including priapulids. Later studies suggested that Acosmia was more likely a crown-group ecdysozoan possibly alied with nematoids.
