= Mark McMenamin =

American paleontologist

- Born: 7 February 1958 (age 68); Oregon, United States
- Education: Stanford University (BA); University of California, Santa Barbara (PhD)
- Known for: Ediacaran fossils; Hypersea theory; Proterozoic supercontinent Rodinia
- Spouse: Dianna L. Schulte McMenamin
- Awards: Presidential Young Investigator Award; Sigma Xi National Lecturer; 2011 Irish Education 100 Award
- Scientific career
- Fields: Paleontology, Geology
- Institutions: Mount Holyoke College

Mark Allan S. McMenamin (born 4 February 1958) is an American paleontologist and professor of geology at Mount Holyoke College. He has contributed to the study of the Cambrian explosion and the Ediacaran biota.

He is the author of several books, most recently Deep Time Analysis (2018) and Dynamic Paleontology (2016). His earlier works include The Garden of Ediacara: Discovering the Earliest Complex Life (1998), one of the only popular accounts of research on the Ediacaran biota, and Science 101: Geology (2007). He is credited with co-naming several geological formations in Mexico, describing several new fossil genera and species, and naming the Precambrian supercontinent Rodinia and the superocean Mirovia. The Cambrian archeocyathid species Markocyathus clementensis was named in his honor in 1989.

== Early life and career ==
McMenamin was born in Oregon. He earned a B.S. at Stanford University in 1979 and his Ph.D. from the University of California, Santa Barbara, in 1984. In 1980, while at Santa Barbara he met his future wife, Dianna Schulte McMenamin, also a paleontology graduate student, with whom he would co-author several publications. He joined the staff at Mount Holyoke College in 1984.

== Research and theories ==
McMenamin's work on the paleoecology of the Cambrian explosion controversially argued that the tiny planktonic trilobites belonging to the Agnostida may have had a predatory lifestyle.

McMenamin's research on the Phoenician world map helped to inspire Clive Cussler and Paul Kemprecos's 2007 novel The Navigator, and his Garden of Ediacara theory helped to inspire Greg Bear's novel Vitals.

== Origins of complex life ==
In 1995, McMenamin led a field expedition to Sonora, Mexico, that discovered fossils (550-560 million years old) which McMenamin argued belonged to a diverse community of early animals and Ediacaran biota. The paper was published in the Proceedings of the National Academy of Sciences of the United States of America where it was reviewed by Ediacaran expert James G. Gehling. In 2011, McMenamin reported the discovery of the oldest known adult animal fossils, Proterozoic chitons from the Clemente Formation, northwestern Sonora, Mexico. However, during earlier report by him, other researchers questioned about its affinity as biogenic fossils, which also predate the majority of Ediacaran biota by at least 50 million years. Further up in this same stratigraphic sequence, McMenamin also discovered and named the early shelly fossil Sinotubulites cienegensis, a fossil that allowed the first confident Proterozoic biostratigraphic correlation between Asia and the Americas. In Lower Cambrian strata higher in the stratigraphic sequence, McMenamin also discovered important stem group brachiopods belonging to the genus Mickwitzia. During a Mount Holyoke College field trip to Death Valley, California, McMenamin and his co-authors found evidence indicating that the Proterozoic shelly fossil Qinella survived the Proterozoic-Cambrian boundary.

In 2012 McMenamin proposed that the enigmatic Cambrian trace fossil Paleodictyon was the nest of an unknown animal, a hypothesis which, if supported, may be the earliest fossil evidence of parental behavior, surpassing previous findings by 200 million years. In his 2019 article 'Cambrian Chordates and Vetulicolians', McMenamin described Shenzianyuloma yunnanense, a new genus and species of Vetulicolia interpreted as bearing myotome cones, a notochord, and gut diverticula in its posterior section.

== Hypersea ==
In an attempt to explain the unprecedented and rapid spread of vegetation over dry land surfaces during the middle Paleozoic, Mark and Dianna McMenamin proposed the Hypersea Theory. Their Hypersea is a geophysiological entity consisting of eukaryotic organisms on land and their symbionts. By means of a process known as hypermarine upwelling, the expansion of Hypersea led to a dramatic increase in global species diversity and a one hundred-fold increase in global biomass. Mark McMenamin's Hypertopia Option has been called one of only two "means by which planetary temperature can be stabilized."

== Critique of Neodarwinism ==
Mark McMenamin has repeatedly criticized conventional Neodarwinian theory as inadequate to the task of explaining the evolutionary process. Joining with Lynn Margulis and the Russian symbiogeneticists, McMenamin has argued that symbiogenesis theory is important as one means of addressing the gap in our understanding of macroevolutionary change in conventional Neodarwinian terms.

== Phoenician coins ==
In 1996, McMenamin proposed that Phoenician sailors discovered the New World c. 350 BC. The Phoenician state of Carthage minted gold staters in 350 BC bearing a pattern in the reverse exergue of the coins, which McMenamin interpreted as a map of the Mediterranean with the Americas shown to the west across the Atlantic. McMenamin later demonstrated that other (base metal) coins found in America were modern forgeries.

== Triassic kraken ==
Mark McMenamin and Dianna Schulte McMenamin argued that a formation of multiple ichthyosaur fossils (belonging to the genus Shonisaurus) placed together at Berlin–Ichthyosaur State Park may represent evidence of a gigantic cephalopod or Triassic kraken that killed the ichthyosaurs and intentionally arranged their bones in the unusual pattern seen at the site.

Opponents have challenged the theory as too far-fetched to be credible. PZ Myers believes that a much simpler explanation is that the rows of vertebral discs may be a result of the ichthyosaurs having fallen to one side or the other after death and rotting in that position, while Ryosuke Motani, a paleontologist at the University of California, Davis, has alternately proposed that the bones may have been moved together by ocean currents because of their circular shape. McMenamin has dismissed both of these concerns as not being in accord with either the sequence of bone placement or the hydrodynamics of the site.

Mark and Dianna McMenamin presented new evidence favoring the existence of the hypothesized Triassic kraken on October 31, 2013 at the Geological Society of America annual meeting in Denver, Colorado. Paleontologist David Fastovsky critiqued McMenamin's argument, saying that the fossil fragment used as evidence was too small to determine its origin and that the argument about currents didn't take into account the lack of knowledge about currents at the time and what would be needed to move the vertebrae. Fastovsky stated that the most likely scenario was one in which, once the tendons and ligaments holding the vertebrae together are gone, the vertebral column "sort of starts to fall over almost like a row of dominoes" with the most likely configuration for that to be the assemblage found. Adolf Seilacher has noted that this ichthyosaur bone arrangement "has never been observed at other localities".

In 2023, McMenamin described a fossil that he interpreted as upper beak rostrum of a large cephalopod and estimated total length of this animal at 28.6 metres (94 ft). Based on the morphology of the fossil, McMenamin rejected previous interpretation of the fossil as part of the hinge of a ramonalinid clam.

== Filmography ==
Film and television
Year	Title	Role	Notes
2006	Naked Science--Colliding Continents	Miscellaneous Crew, Himself	National Geographic
2007	How the Earth Was Made	Himself	History Channel
2013	America Unearthed	Himself	Committee Films TV Documentary

== Books ==
- McMenamin, Mark A. S.; McMenamin, Dianna Schulte. (Jan 1990). The Emergence of Animals: The Cambrian Breakthrough. Columbia University Press. ISBN 0-231-06646-5.
- McMenamin, Mark A. S.; McMenamin, Dianna Schulte (1994). Hypersea: Life on the Land. Columbia University Press. ISBN 0-231-07530-8.
- McMenamin, Mark A. S. (1996). Carthaginian Cartography: A Stylized Exergue Map. Meanma Press. ISBN 0-9651136-1-2.
- McMenamin, Mark A. S. (1998). The Garden of Ediacara: Discovering the Earliest Complex Life. Columbia University Press.
- McMenamin, Mark A. S. (Jun 2007). Science 101: Geology. Collins. ISBN 978-0-06-089136-7.
- McMenamin, Mark A. S. (2009). Paleotorus: The Laws of Morphogenetic Evolution. Meanma Press. ISBN 978-1-893882-18-8.
- McMenamin, Mark A. S. (2016). Dynamic Paleontology: Using Quantification and Other Tools to Decipher the History of Life. Springer. ISBN 978-3-319-22776-4.
- McMenamin, Mark A. S. (2018). Deep Time Analysis: A Coherent View of the History of Life. Springer. ISBN 978-3-319-74255-7.
