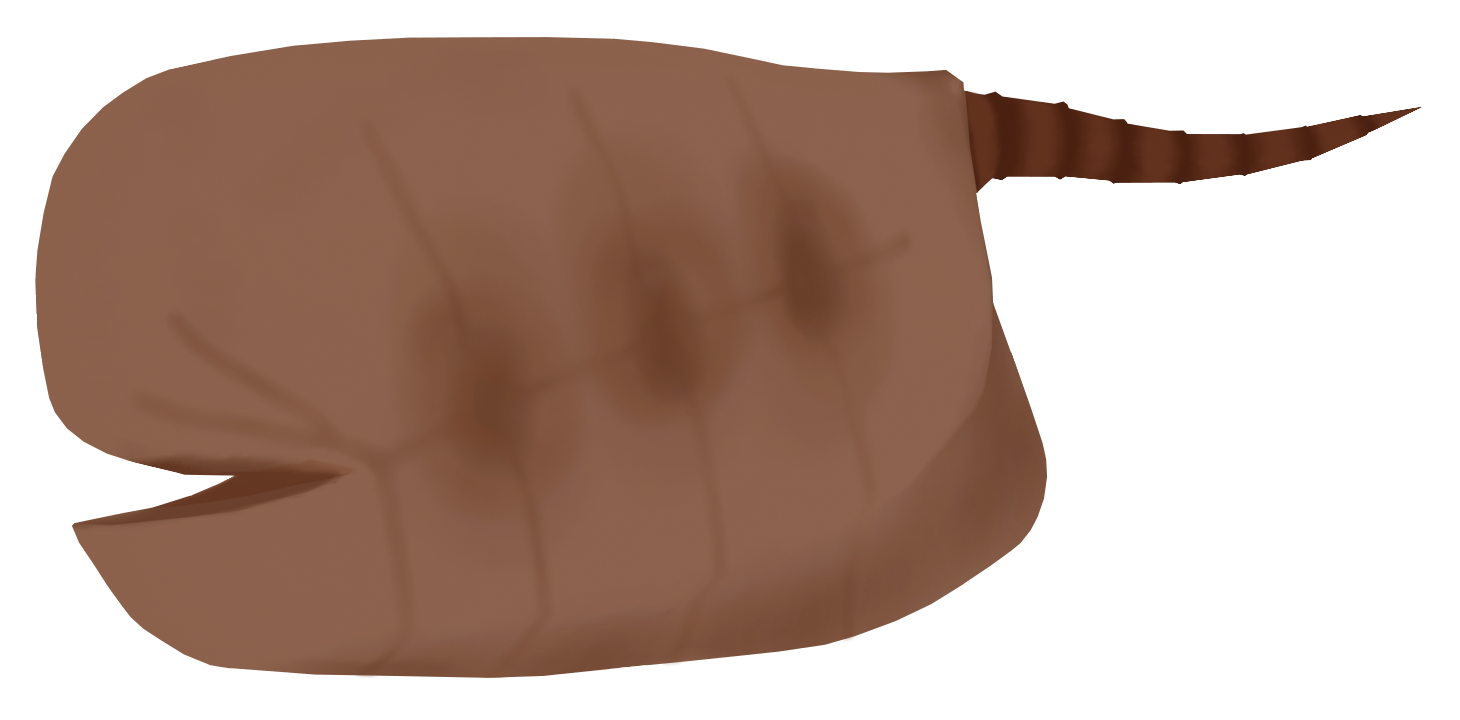
- Reconstruction of Alienum velamenus

Scientific classification
- Kingdom: Animalia
- Phylum: Chordata
- Clade?: †Vetulicolia (?)
- Genus: †Alienum; Liu et al., 2024
- Species: †A. velamenus

Binomial name
- †Alienum velamenus Liu et al., 2024

= Alienum =

Alienum Temporal range: late Ediacaran ~541 Ma

Species of possible Ediacaran Vetulicolian

Alienum is an extinct genus of animal of uncertain affinity from the late Ediacaran. Estimated to be about 541 million years old, the type species, Alienum velamenus demonstrates some anatomical characters reminiscent of vetulicolians, while predating the first undisputed member of this clade by 20 million years. It was described in 2024 based on a specimen from the Dengying Formation of South China.

== Discovery ==
The holotype fossil of Alienum was found in the Dengying Formation of South China in 2021 during an expedition finding fossils of the ribbon-like Rugosusivitta from younger Cambrian strata, and was officially described in 2024.

== Etymology ==
The generic name Alienum is derived from the English word alien, which further derives from the Latin word aliēnus, meaning "exotic/foreign". The specific name velamenus is derived from the Latin word velamen, meaning "veil/sail-like", relating to the sail-like shape of the anterior of the body.

== Description ==
Alienum velamenus seems to share certain features seen in Vetulicolia, but not to the extent to allow for a proper assignment to the clade, as several defining vetulicolian features are absent.

It has a rounded body 17.4 mm (0.7 in) in length, with the dorsal and ventral sides of the body being much thicker, suggesting it may have been soft-bodied with a cavity in the middle. The anterior part features two notches, a small arched notch further up with an unknown use, and a much deeper notch further down, suspected to be the mouth, with a little 'cashew' shaped flap nearby. Along the length of the body there is a 9 mm (0.4 in) long stripe/groove, which can be compared to the pharyngeal groove structure of vetulicolians, although in the case of Alienum, this extends diagonally backwards, whilst in vetulicolians, this is an axial groove. Along this groove are three gill-like structures with large gill slits extending dorsally and ventrally through them, similar again to vetulicolians, although they have five gill-like holes and gill slits. The posterior body features a stalk-like structure, around 5 mm (0.2 in) in length, similar to a tail.

Although it has many similarities to vetulicolians, it lacks a few important features, including dorsal fin-like structures, a hard chitinous body, and a lack of lobes before the body, as well as being different in geological age. As such, it would be very primitive if its affinities lie within Vetulicolia, and would support current molecular clock studies on deuterostomes if they are correct.

== See also ==
- List of Ediacaran genera
