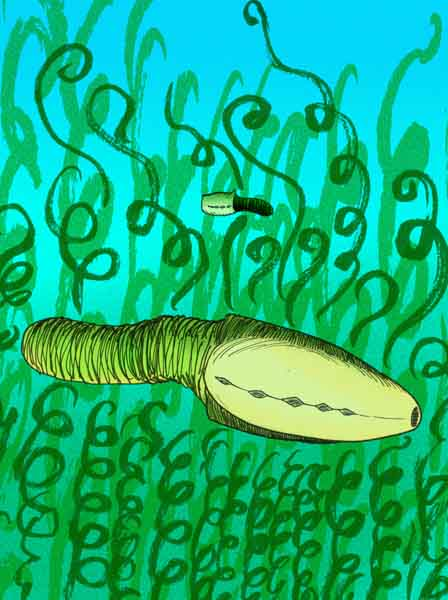
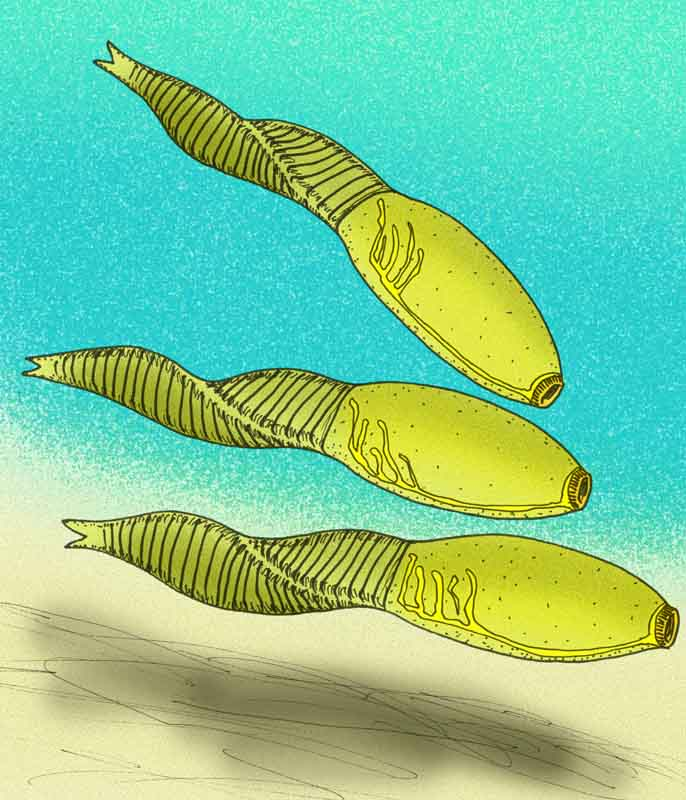
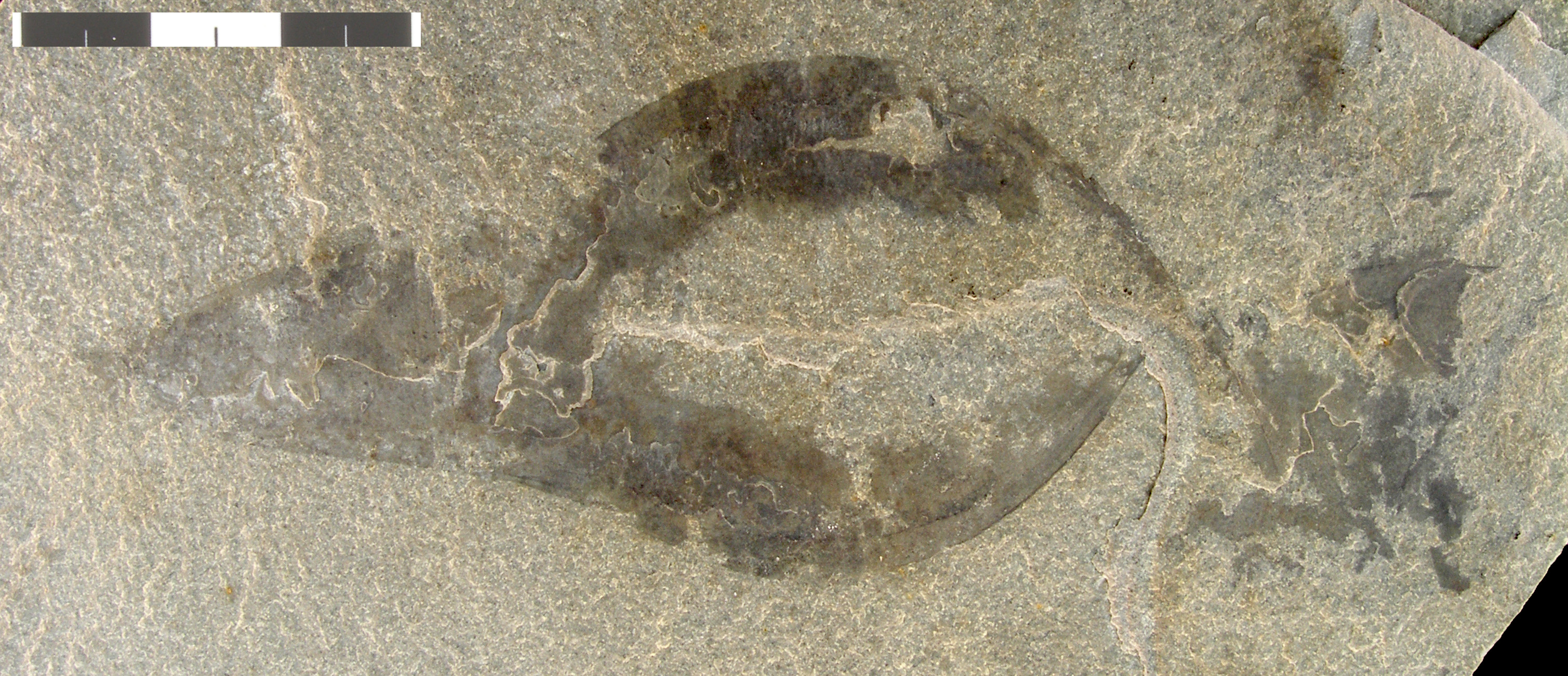
- H. confusus B. constricta B. episoma Fossils and reconstructions of banffiids (with much smaller non-banffiid "Form A" above H. confusus)

Scientific classification
- Kingdom: Animalia
- Phylum: Chordata
- Clade?: †Vetulicolia
- Class: †Banffozoa
- Order: †Banffiata
- Family: †Banffiidae; Caron, 2006

Type genus
- †Banffia Walcott 1911

Genera
- †Banffia Walcott 1911; †Heteromorphus Luo and Hu, in Luo et al. 1999; ? †Skeemella Briggs et al. 2005

= Banffiidae =

Banffiidae Temporal range: about 518–501 Ma Cambrian Stage 3—Drumian

Extinct Cambrian family of animals

Banfiidae is a family of extinct banffozoan animals from North America and China. The family name is sometimes spelt Banffidae. It includes Banffia, Heteromorphus, and possibly Skeemella. The family may be paraphyletic. A Heteromorphus-like dwarf "Form A" is allied with this group at the class level, but has not been formally described or assigned to this family.

== Description ==
Banffiids have a bipartite body with a smooth anterior part that may or may not have a lateral groove, and a posterior part with many segments. Lateral pouches have not been seen, although some questions remain regarding their possible presence in Skeemella. The entire body is twisted dextrally (from an anterior view). Gut diverticula may be present, but the structures interpreted as such could alternatively be a circulatory system. The anus is terminal, despite initial reports to the contrary in Heteromorphus.

== Distribution ==
Banffiids have been found across multiple paleocontinents, with Heteromorphus found in the Chengjiang lagerstatte of South China while Banffia has been found in the Burgess Shale and Spence Shale of western Laurentia. Skeemella has been found in the Pierson Cove and Marjum Formations, both above the Wheeler Shale and also in western Laurentia.

== Taxonomy ==
The family Banffiidae and the class Banffozoa were proposed in a paper published in 2006, in order to contain Banffia constricta in a redescription of that species, with Heteromorphus only mentioned as a possible home outside of Banffiidae for Banffia confusa. A comprehensive phylogenetic revision in 2007 expanded Banffozoa to encompass the proposed class Heteromorphida (which had excluded Banffia), and placed Heteromorphus in the Banffiidae. It tentatively placed Skeemella outside of Banffiidae and the newly-erected order Banffiata, but under Banffozoa. "Form A", which had been included in the Heteromorphida, was not mentioned or reassigned. Two later sources have placed Skemella in Banffiidae while continuing to note doubts as to whether it is actually a vetulicolian.

Banffozoans have been recognized as "rather different from vetulicolians proper," and proposed to be more closely related to protostomes. However, multiple sources treat Banffozoa as part of Vetulicolia.

=== Cladograms ===
A 2024 study has found the Banffiidae to form the earliest part of the paraphyletic stem-chordate evolutionary grade, as shown in this simplified cladogram:

- Chordata (total group)
  - Banffia†
  - Heteromorphus†
  - - Skeemella†
    - - Nesonektris†
      - - Vetulicolidae†
        - - Didazoon†
          - Pomatrum†
          - Yuyuanozoon†
          - - Yunnanozoon†
            - - Cathaymyrus†
              - Pikaia†
              - Chordata
                (crown group)

An earlier study in 2014 placed vetulicolians as the sister-group of tunicates, but was unable to resolve any relationships among vetulicolians as a group:

- Vetulicolia†
  - Vetulicola†
  - Beidazoon†
  - Ooedigera†
  - Pomatrum† / Xidazoon†
  - Didazoon†
  - Yuyuanozoon†
  - Banffia†
  - Heteromorphus†
  - Nesonektris†
- Tunicata
