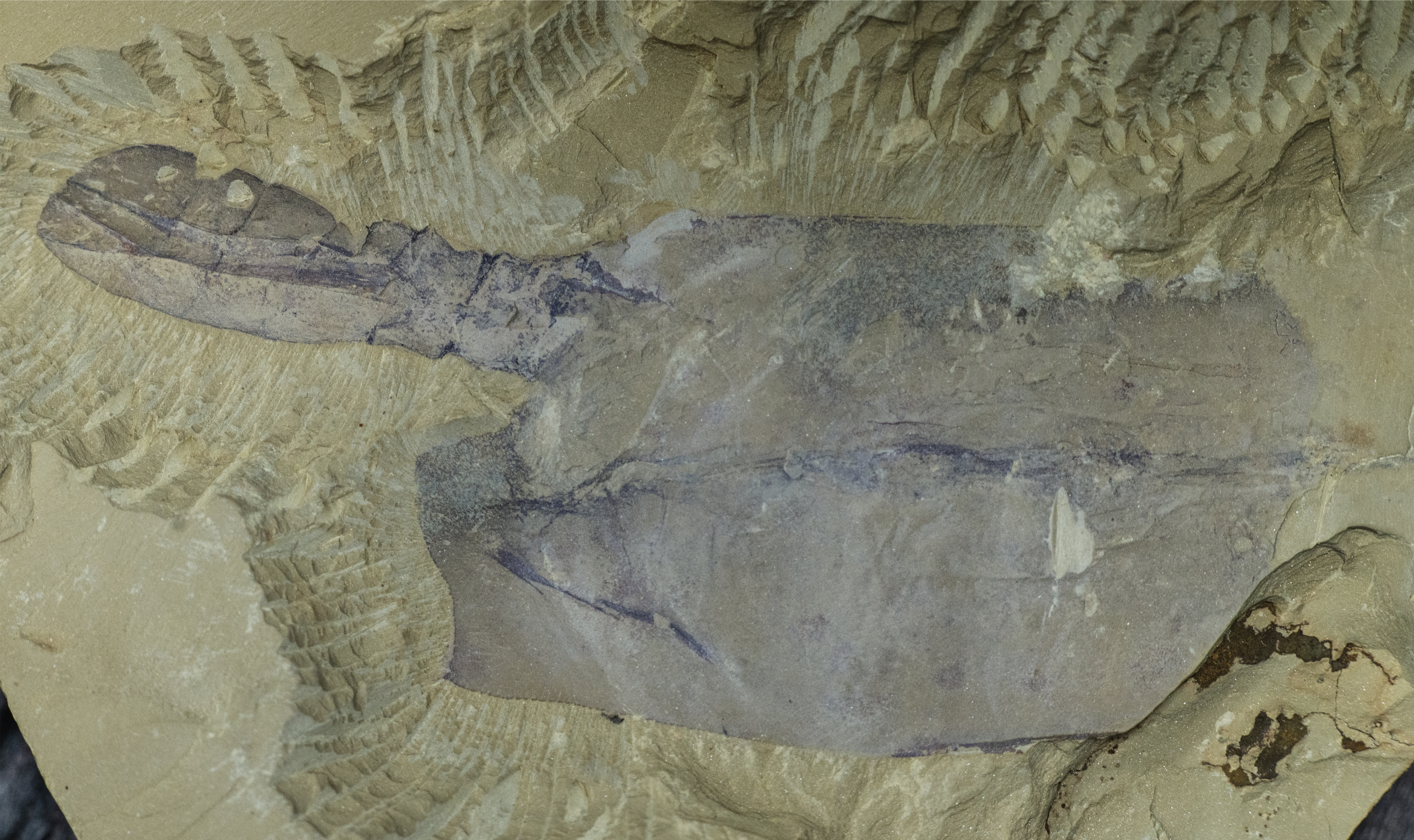
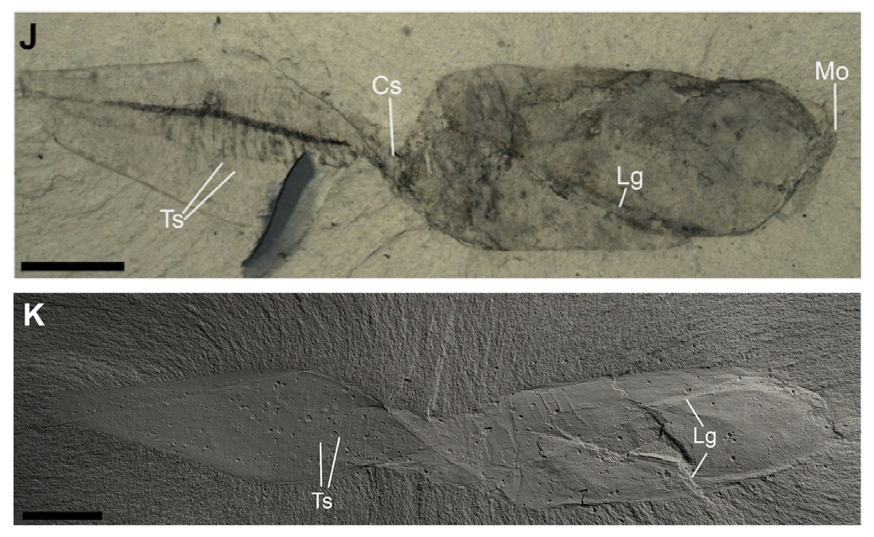
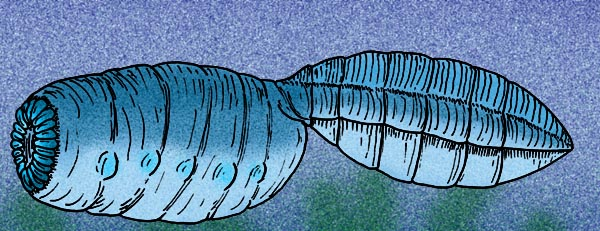
- Fossil of Vetulicola cuneata Fossil of Banffia constricta Didazoon haoae Restorations and fossils of vetulicolians

Scientific classification
- Kingdom: Animalia
- Phylum: Chordata
- Clade?: †Vetulicolia; Shu et al. 2001

Type species
- †Vetulicola cuneata Hou, 1987

Classes
- †Banffozoa; †Vetulicolida; incertae sedis; ? †Alienum; †Shenzianyuloma

= Vetulicolia =

Vetulicolia Temporal range: about 520–501 Ma Cambrian Stage 3—Drumian (Possible Ediacaran record)

Extinct Cambrian group of animals

Vetulicolia is a group of bilaterian marine animals encompassing several extinct species from the early Cambrian and even possibly Ediacaran, periods. As of 2023, the majority of scientists favor placing Vetulicolians in the stem group of the Chordata, but some continue to favor a more crownward placement as a sister group to the Tunicata. It was initially erected as a monophyletic clade with the rank of phylum in 2001, with subsequent work supporting its monophyly. However, more recent research suggests that vetulicolians may be paraphyletic and form a basal evolutionary grade of stem chordates.

== Etymology ==
The taxon name, Vetulicolia, is derived from the type genus, Vetulicola, which is a compound Latin word composed of vetulus "old" and -cola "inhabitant". It was named after Vetulicola cuneata, the first species of the group described in 1987.

== Description ==
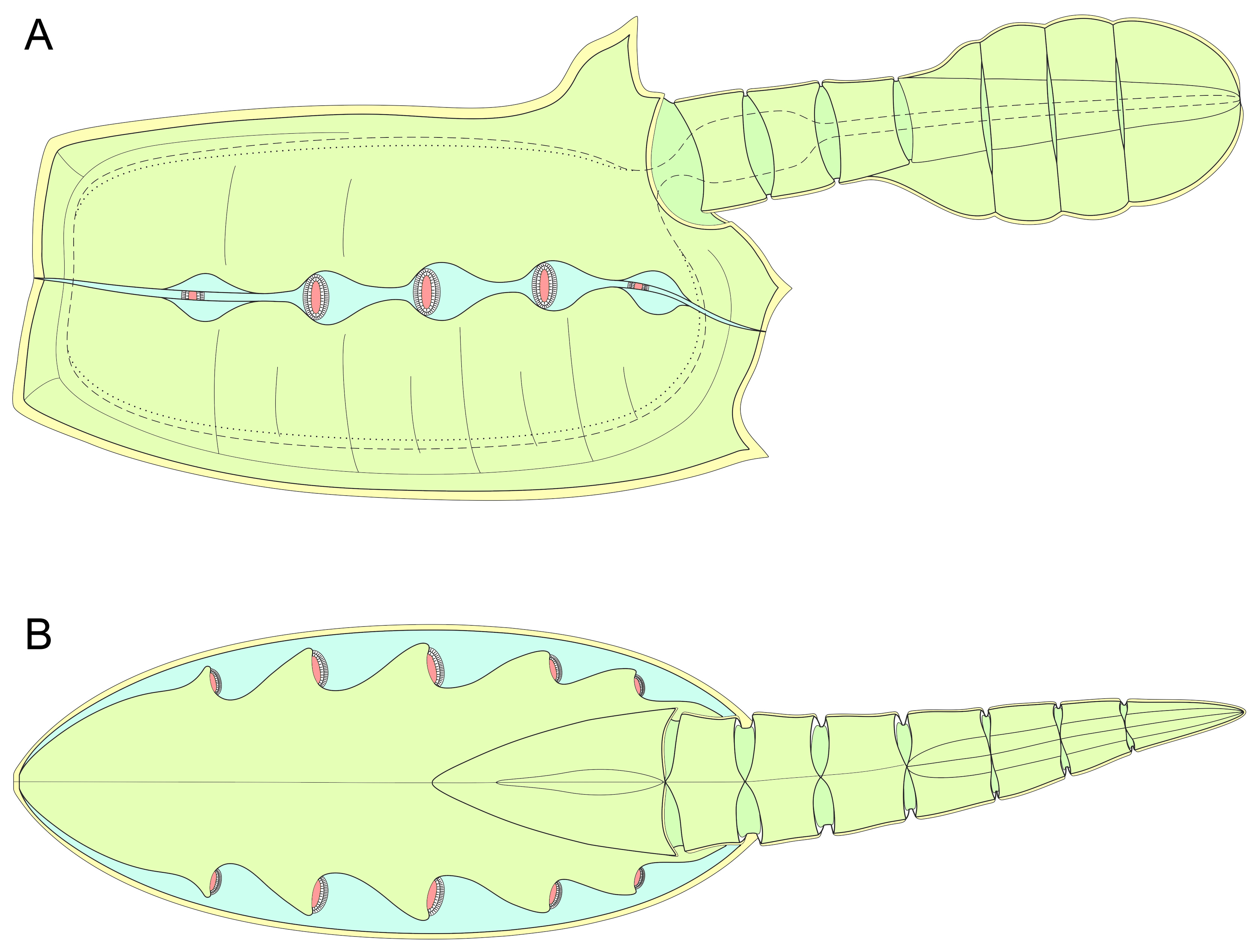
Schematic of V. rectangulata pharynx and alimentary canal: dashed line; ventral food grooves: dotted line; gill slits: pink

The vetulicolian body plan comprises two parts: a voluminous rostral (anterior) forebody, tipped with an anteriorly positioned mouth and lined with a lateral row of five round to oval-shaped openings on each side, which have been interpreted as gills (or at least orifices in the vicinity of the pharynx); and a caudal (posterior) section that primitively comprises seven body segments and functions as a tail. All vetulicolians lack preserved appendages of any kind, having no legs, feelers or even eye spots. The area where the anterior and posterior parts join is constricted in most genera. Notochord-like structures have been found in some vetulicolian fossils.

== Ecology and lifestyle ==
From their superficially tadpole-like forms, leaf or paddle-shaped tails, and various degrees of streamlining, it is assumed that all vetulicolians discovered to date were swimming animals that spent much, if not all, of their time living in water. Some groups, like the genus Vetulicola, were more streamlined (complete with ventral keels) than other groups, such as the tadpole-like Didazoonidae.

Because all vetulicolians had mouths which had no features for chewing or grasping, it is assumed that they were not predators. Since vetulicolians possessed gill slits, many researchers regard these organisms as planktivores. The sediment infills in the guts of their fossils have caused some to suggest that they were deposit feeders. This idea has been contested, as deposit feeders tend to have straight guts, whereas the hindguts of vetulicolians were spiral-shaped. Some researchers propose that the vetulicolians were "selective deposit-feeders" which actively swam from one region of the seafloor to another, while supplementing their nutrition with filter-feeding.

The earliest vetulicolians appear to have lived in shallow water, with the first deeper water specimens appearing in the Balang biota and possibly in the Qingjiang biota.

== Taxonomy and evolution ==
Banffozoans

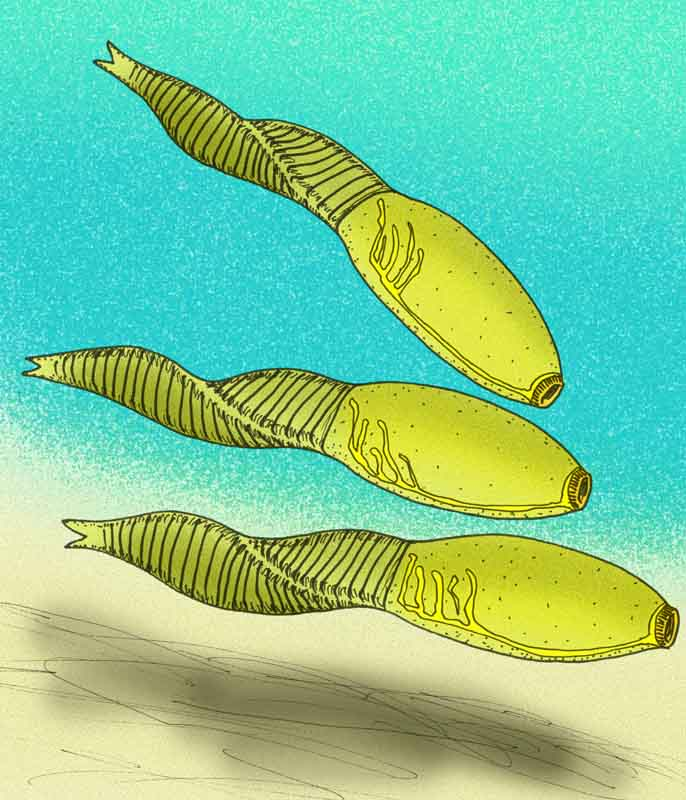
Life restoration of Banffia constricta

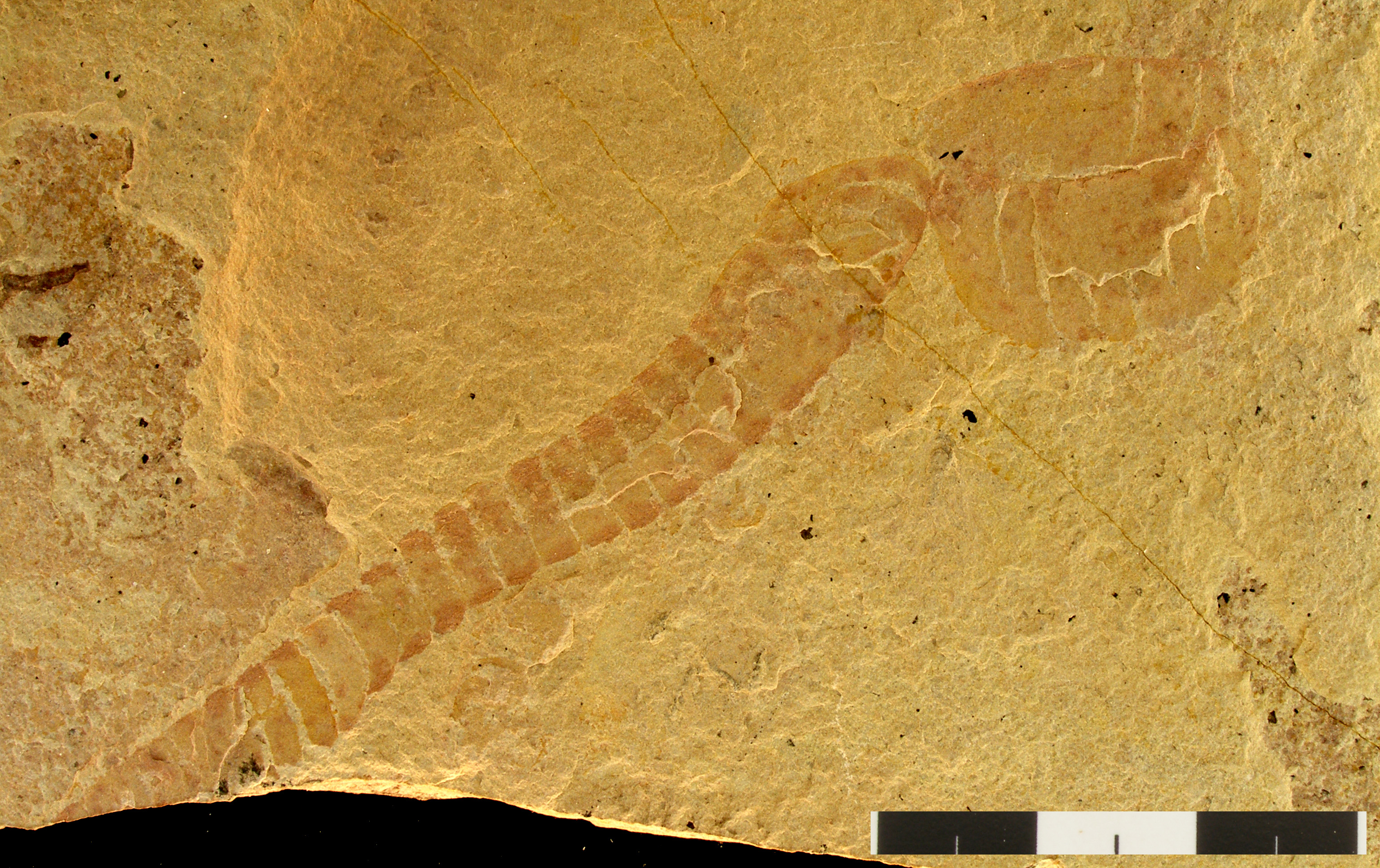
Fossil of Skeemella clavula

The phylum Vetulicolia was erected in 2001 to group the genera Vetulicola, Didazoon, and Xidazoon (later deemed a junior synonym of Pomatrum). Prior to this the class Vetulicolida had been defined in 1997 to group Vetulicola with the previously enigmatic genus Banffia due to its similar two-part construction, as well as apparent gill slits in a newly discovered specimen. Further work split Banffia into a separate class called Banffozoa, which was soon expanded to encompass similar species such as Heteromorphus. While subsequent studies supported the monophyly of Vetulicolia, it has also been noted that this would preclude vetulicolians representing a stepwise development of deuterostome characteristics, as the genus with the most such characteristics, Vetulicola, is one of the most derived in the group.

A 2024 phylogenetic analysis by Mussini and colleagues found vetulicolians to be a paraphyletic group of stem-chordates, lying outside a clade formed by Yunnanozoon, Cathaymyrus, Pikaia and crown-chordates. This is in part due to the Cambroernida, which are basal stem-ambulacrarians, being discovered to share with vetulicolians a lack of crown-group chordate characters such as a post-anal tail, despite such characteristics previously being believed to be present in the last common ancestor of deuterostomes. However, ascidian larvae have been noted to have endoderm extending to the terminal end, which could suggest that the ancestral tunicate also had a terminal anus.

Other possible placements are suggested by the Centroneuralia hypothesis, which features a paraphyletic Deuterostomia with chordates as the sister-group to protostomes. If proven true, pharyngeal slits would no longer require a deuterostome placement and vetulicolians could prove to be stem protostomes that lost the post-anal tail. In such a scenario, Banffozoa could be a more derived stem protostome group than Vetulicolida.

=== Cladograms ===
The following cladograms show two possible placements of the Vetulicolia.

First, following García-Bellido et al. 2014, a monophyletic Vetulicolia is shown as the sister group to Tunicata, but with all internal relationships unresolved.

The second, following Mussini et al, 2024, shows Vetulicolia as a paraphyletic group comprising various stem-group lineages branching off the lineage leading towards the common ancestor of living chordates, with the "banffozoans" like Banffia and Heteromorphus placed as the most primitive stem-chordates. Within the Vetulicolia, the family Vetulicolidae as defined by Li et al. (2018) is recovered as monophyletic, while the three widely accepted members of the Didazoonidae are in a polytomy with the clade of crownward chordates.

The possible presence of a notochord in Nesonektris and the lack of clear evidence for one in Pikaia is relevant to the validity of the following cladograms. Proponents of a monophyletic Vetulicolia as the sister group of Tunicata note that scoring the notochord as "unknown" in Nesonektris produces the same topology, albeit with less support for certain nodes. Proponents of a paraphyletic Vetulicolia, who assume that both Pikaia and Nesonektris lacked a notochord, similarly note that scoring Nesonektris as having a notochord did not significantly change their topology. They also noted that fossils of unambiguous crown-group chordates also frequently lack a visible notochord, but the paper cited regarding this lack lists the notochord as one of the last anatomical structures to decay, with other structures preserved in Pikaia more likely to decay more quickly. Alternatively, a separate paper examining hypotheses regarding a notochord in Pikaia notes that it may have been lost as other structures evolved to take over its function.

Simplified from García-Bellido et al. (2014), showing Vetulicolia as a monophyletic group sister to the tunicates.

- Chordata
  - Cephalochordata
  - Olfactores
    - Vertebrata (total group)
      - Yunnanozoa†
      - - Pikaia†
        - - Conodonta†
          - Vertebrata
            (crown group)
    - Tunicata (total group)
      - Vetulicolia†
        - Vetulicola†
        - Pomatrum† / Xidazoon†
        - Didazoon†
        - Beidazoon†
        - Yuyuanozoon†
        - Banffia†
        - Heteromorphus†
        - Ooedigera†
        - Nesonektris†
      - Tunicata
        (crown group)
- Ambulacraria
  - Enteropneusta
  - Echinodermata

Cladogram after Mussini et al. 2024, showing Vetulicolia as a paraphyletic stem group to crown Chordata.

- Chordata (total group)
  - †Banffia
  - †Heteromorphus
  - - †Skeemella
    - - †Nesonektris
      - - †Vetulicolidae
          - †Ooedigera
          - - †Vetulicola cuneata
            - †Vetulicola gantoucunensis
            - †Vetulicola longbaoshanensis
            - †Vetulicola rectangulata
            - - †Vetulicola monile
              - †Beidazoon
        - - †Didazoon
          - †Pomatrum
          - †Yuyuanozoon
          - - †Yunnanozoon
            - - †Cathaymyrus
              - †Pikaia
              - Chordata (crown group)
                - Cephalochordata
                - - Tunicata
                  - - †Metaspriggina
                    - - †Myllokunmingia
                      - Vertebrata

=== Classification ===
External videos
- Cambrian Not-Fishes (3D Paleoart) - YouTube

The following classification is taken from Li et al. (2018) except where noted.

- Phylum Vetulicolia Shu et al. 2001
  - ? Genus Alienum Liu et al. 2024
    - A. velamenus Liu et al. 2024
  - Genus Shenzianyuloma McMenamin 2019
    - S. yunnanense McMenamin 2019
  - Class Heteromorphida Shu 2005 (= Banffozoa Caron 2006)
    - "Form A" Shu 2005
    - Order Banffiata Aldridge et al. 2007
      - Family Banffiidae Caron 2006
        - Genus Banffia Walcott 1911
          - B. constricta Walcott 1911
          - B. episoma Conway Morris and Selden 2015
        - Genus Heteromorphus Luo and Hu in Luo et al. 1999
          - H. confusus Chen and Zhou 1997 (= Banffia confusa) Chen and Zhou 1997; = H. longicaudatus Luo and Hu in Luo et al. 1999)
        - Genus Skeemella Briggs et al. 2005
          - S. clavula Briggs et al. 2005
  - Class Vetulicolida Chen and Zhou 1997
    - Genus Nesonektris García-Bellido et al. 2014
      - N. aldridgei García-Bellido et al. 2014
    - Order Vetulicolata Hou and Bergström 1997
      - Family Vetulicolidae Hou and Bergström 1997
        - Genus Vetulicola Hou 1987
          - V. cuneata Hou 1987
          - V. rectangulata Luo and Hu in Luo et al. 1999
          - V. gantoucunensis Luo et al. 2005
          - V. monile Aldridge et al. 2007
          - V. longbaoshanensis Yang et al. 2010
        - Genus Ooedigera Vinther et al. 2011
          - O. peeli Vinther et al. 2011
        - Genus Beidazoon Shu 2005 (= Bullivetula Aldridge et al. 2007)
          - B. venustum Shu 2005 (= B. variola Aldridge et al. 2007)
      - Family Didazoonidae Shu and Han in Shu et al., 2001
        - Genus Didazoon Shu and Han in Shu et al., 2001
          - D. haoae Shu and Han in Shu et al., 2001
        - Genus Pomatrum Luo and Hu, in Luo et al. 1999 (= Xidazoon Shu, Conway Morris and Zhang in Shu et al. 1999)
          - P. ventralis Luo and Hu, in Luo et al. 1999 (= X. stephanus Shu, Conway Morris and Zhang in Shu et al. 1999)
        - Genus Yuyuanozoon Chen, Feng and Zhu in Chen et al., 2003
          - Y. magnificissimi Chen, Feng and Zhu in Chen et al., 2003

=== History of identification ===
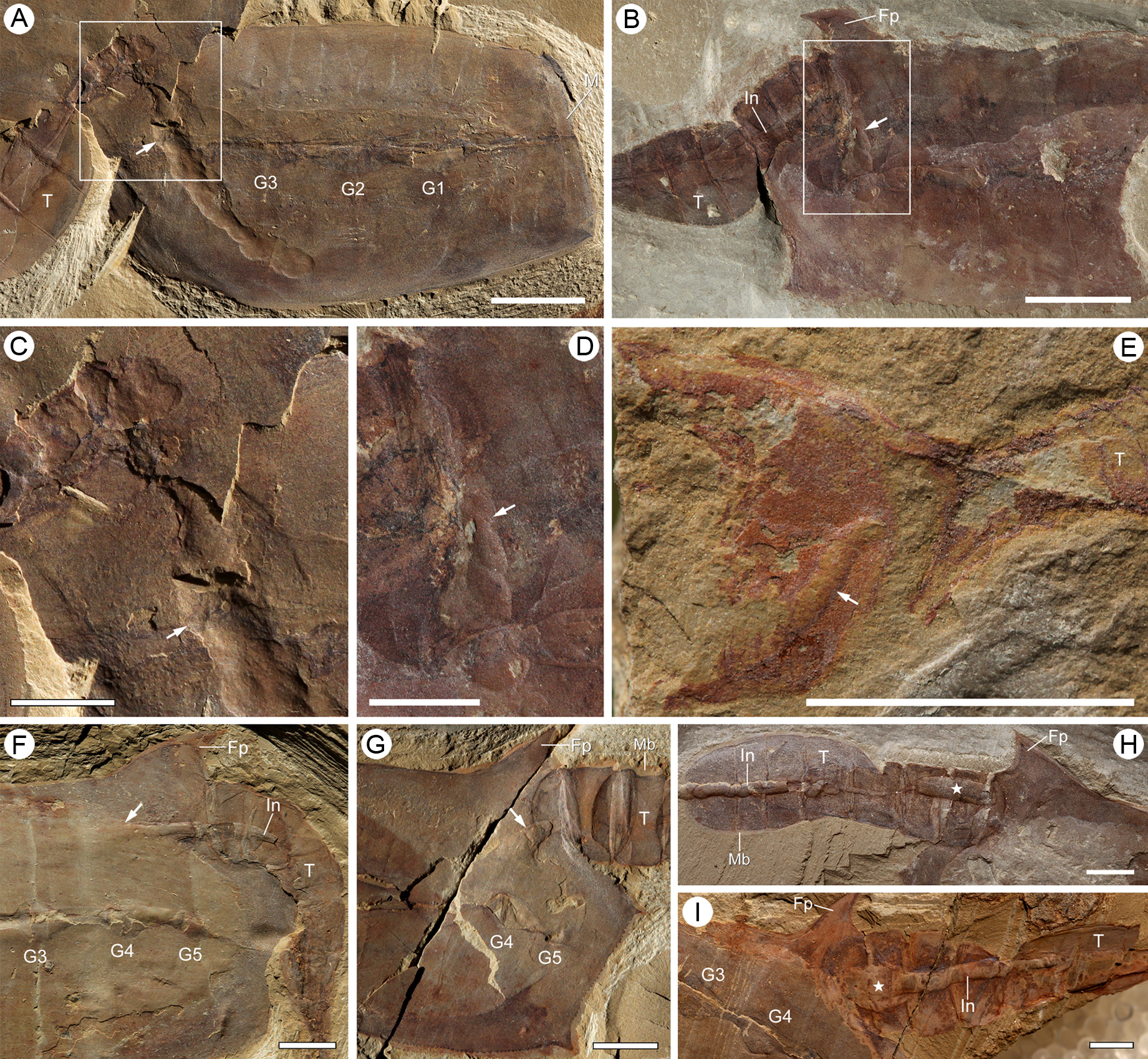
Evidence for the presence of a pharynx and dorsal/ventral feeding gutters in vetulicolians, supporting their placement among the Deuterostomes. Click through for detailed description.

The current consensus view is that vetulicolians are stem group chordates, although some researchers continue to raise other possibilities. The possible identification of an endostyle bolstered theories of a tunicate affinity, but was later retracted, while the tentative identification of a notochord in Nesonektris and Vetulicola has further supported overall chordate affinities. Other characters that have been used to support a tunicate affinity include the limiting of the notochord to the tail and the presence of a stiff cuticle (tunic).

Recent research has strengthened the arguments for placing vetulicolians in the chordate stem lineage rather than near the tunicates. Like vetulicolians, members of the basal ambulacrarian clade Cambroernida have a terminal anus rather than a post-anal tail. Since Ambulacraria is the sister-group of the chordates within the deuterostomes, this suggests that the last common ancestor of both groups lacked a post-anal tail. However, ascidian larvae have been noted to have endoderm extending to the terminal end, which could suggest that tunicates also lacked post-anal tails ancestrally.

Some workers have questioned the inclusion of Banffozoa within this group due to their lack of gill slits and apparent gut diverticula, and have theorized that they may fit within Protostomia instead. Skeemella, in particular, has been noted as having striking arthropod-like characteristics. However, Herpetogaster, the most basal cambroernid, is thought to have non-serialized pores for pharyngial openings. If banffozoans are the most basal vetulicolians, this could explain why they also lack serialized pharyngeal structures. Additionally, a comprehensive review of the Vetulicolia in 2007 did not find evidence of gut diverticula in their material while acknowledging the previous report regarding Banffia. Shenzianyuloma has been interpreted as a vetulicolian with both a notochord (a definitively deuterostome trait) and gut diverticula. However, the single fossil of this genus is of unusual provenance (a "crystal and fossil vendor"), and has not yet been examined by other researchers.

- Protostomia
  - Spiralia
  - Ecdysozoa
    - Kinorhyncha (total group)
      - ? Vetulicolia†
      - Kinorhyncha
        (crown group)
    - Panarthropoda
      - ? Vetulicolia†
      - - Onychophora
        - - - ? Vetulicolia†
            - Anomalocaridida†
          - Arthropoda (total group)
            - ? Vetulicolia†
            - Arthropoda
              (crown group)
- Deuterostomia
  - ? Vetulicolia†
  - - Ambulacraria
      - ? Vetulicolia†
      - - Hemichordata
        - Echinodermata (total group)
          - ? Vetulicolia†
          - Echinodermata
            (crown group)
    - Chordata
      - ? Vetulicolia†
      - - Tunicata (total group)
          - ? Vetulicolia†
          - Tunicata
            (crown group)
        - Euchordata (total group)
          - ? Vetulicolia†
          - Euchordata (crown group)
            - Cephalochordata
            - Vertebrata

Adapted from cladograms in Aldridge et al. 2007, showing each possible placement for Vetulicolia considered in the paper; note the presence of the Euchordata clade rather than the now-favored Olfactores.

Vetulicolians were thought to be stem arthropods when Vetulicola was first discovered, but around 2001 the focus of most theories shifted towards stem deuterostomes due to the discovery of pharyngial gill slits (a deuterostome characteristic), as well as the mounting evidence that vetuicolians have no appendages of any kind. A theory grouping both vetulicolians and vetulocystids with Saccorhytus was disproven when the alleged pharyngial openings of Saccorhytus were shown to be remnants of spines that had broken off; the saccorhytids are now considered to be ecdysozoans.
