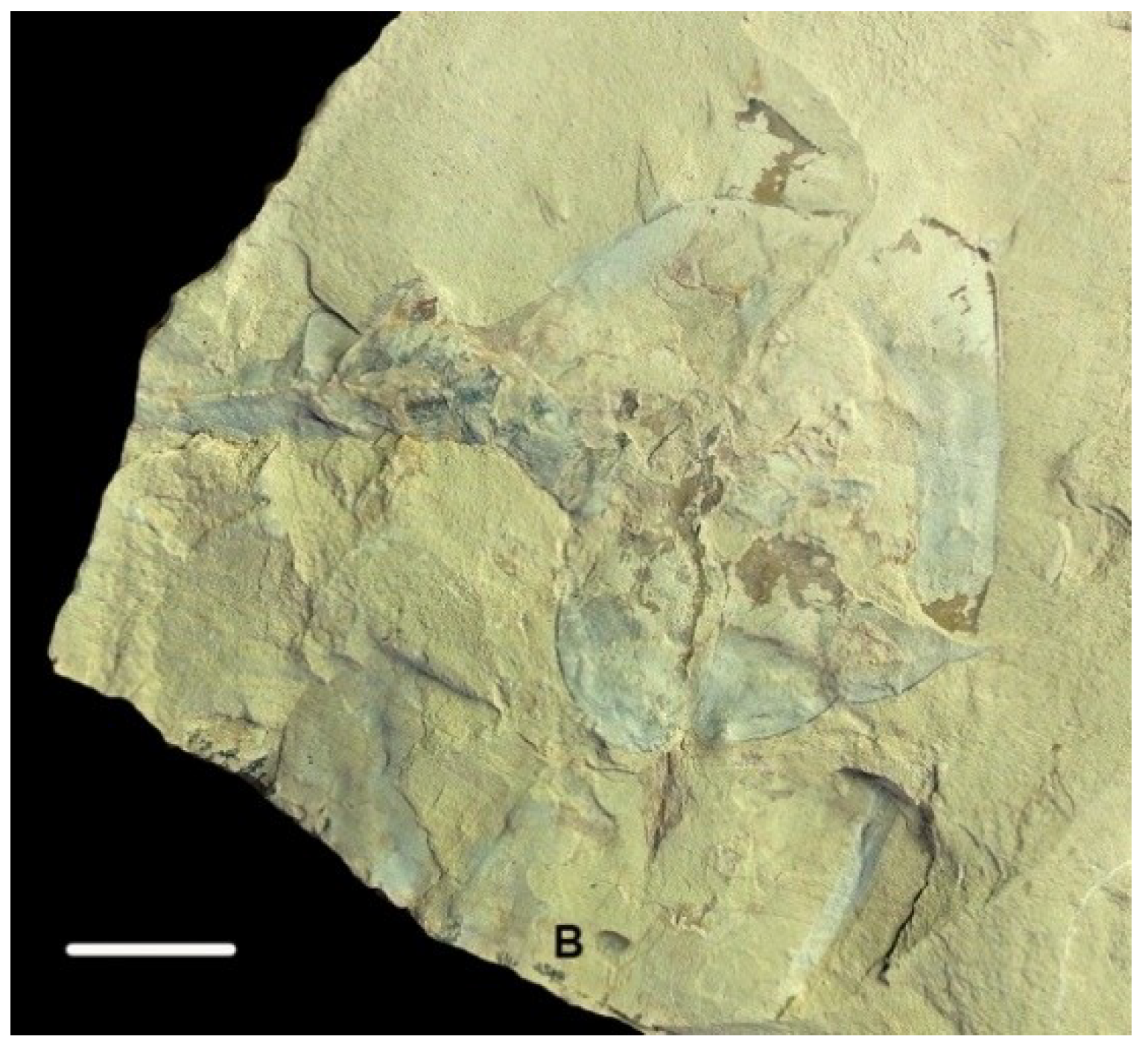
- Holotype of Shenzianyuloma yunnanense
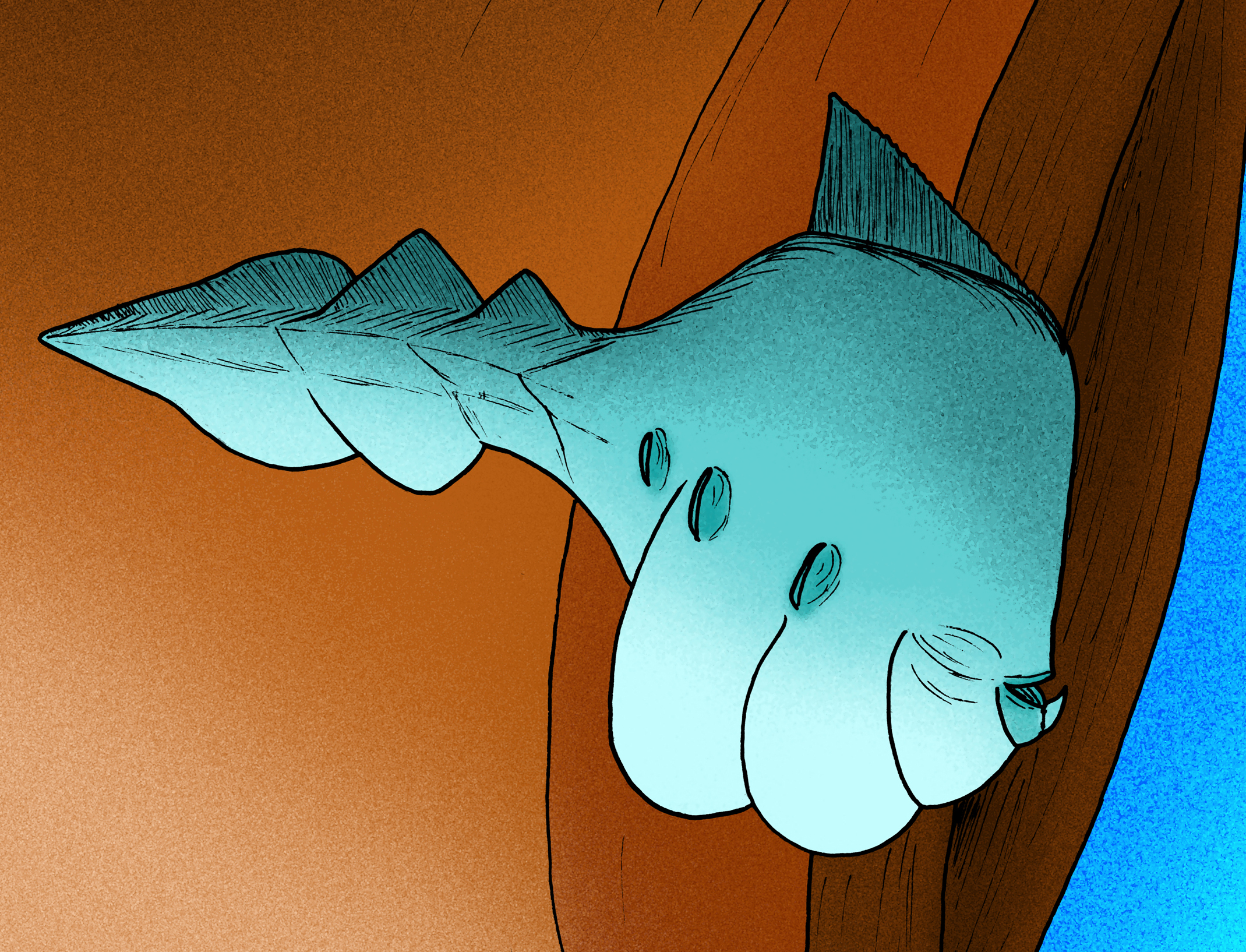
- Reconstruction with a pointed dorsal fin

Scientific classification
- Kingdom: Animalia
- Phylum: Chordata
- Clade?: †Vetulicolia
- Genus: †Shenzianyuloma; McMenamin, 2019
- Species: †S. yunnanense

Binomial name
- †Shenzianyuloma yunnanense McMenamin, 2019

= Shenzianyuloma =

Shenzianyuloma Temporal range: Cambrian Stage 3

Species of vetulicolian invertebrate

Shenzianyuloma is an extinct genus of vetulicolian represented by a single species, Shenzianyuloma yunnanense, from the Maotianshan Shales during Stage 3 (518 million years ago) of the Cambrian period. It is notable for having a compact body shape akin to that of an angelfish. Its exact phylogenetic position is unclear, and it was not included in a 2024 phylogenetic analysis and 2025 review of vetulicolians.

== Etymology ==
The name of the genus is derived from the Chinese shénxiān yú (神仙鱼), meaning "angelfish", and an anagram of Mola.

== Provenance ==
The Shenzianyuloma holotype was acquired from a "crystal and fossil vendor" in Lianyungang, Jiangsu, China, and assigned to the Maotianshan shale based on the presence of the brachiopod Diandongia pista on the same slab, as well as the rock's matrix characteristics.

== Taxonomy ==
As of late 2024, Shenzianyuloma has only been discussed in two papers, both published by MDPI, and has not yet been included in any broader phylogenetic analysis such as that done by Mussini et al. Ma et al. (2025) provided list of vetulicolian fossil records described up to 2023, but Shenzianyuloma is not included.

Shenzianyuloma has been interpreted as having a notochord-like structure, as have some other vetulicolians such as Nesonektris and Vetulicola. The recent consensus places vetulicolians as stem-chordates, but their exact position remains unclear. Depending on that position, the presence of a notochord in Shenzianyuloma could either support an ancestral deuterostome with a primitive notochord-like structure, or help resolve the placement of an archaic chordate-related phylum.
