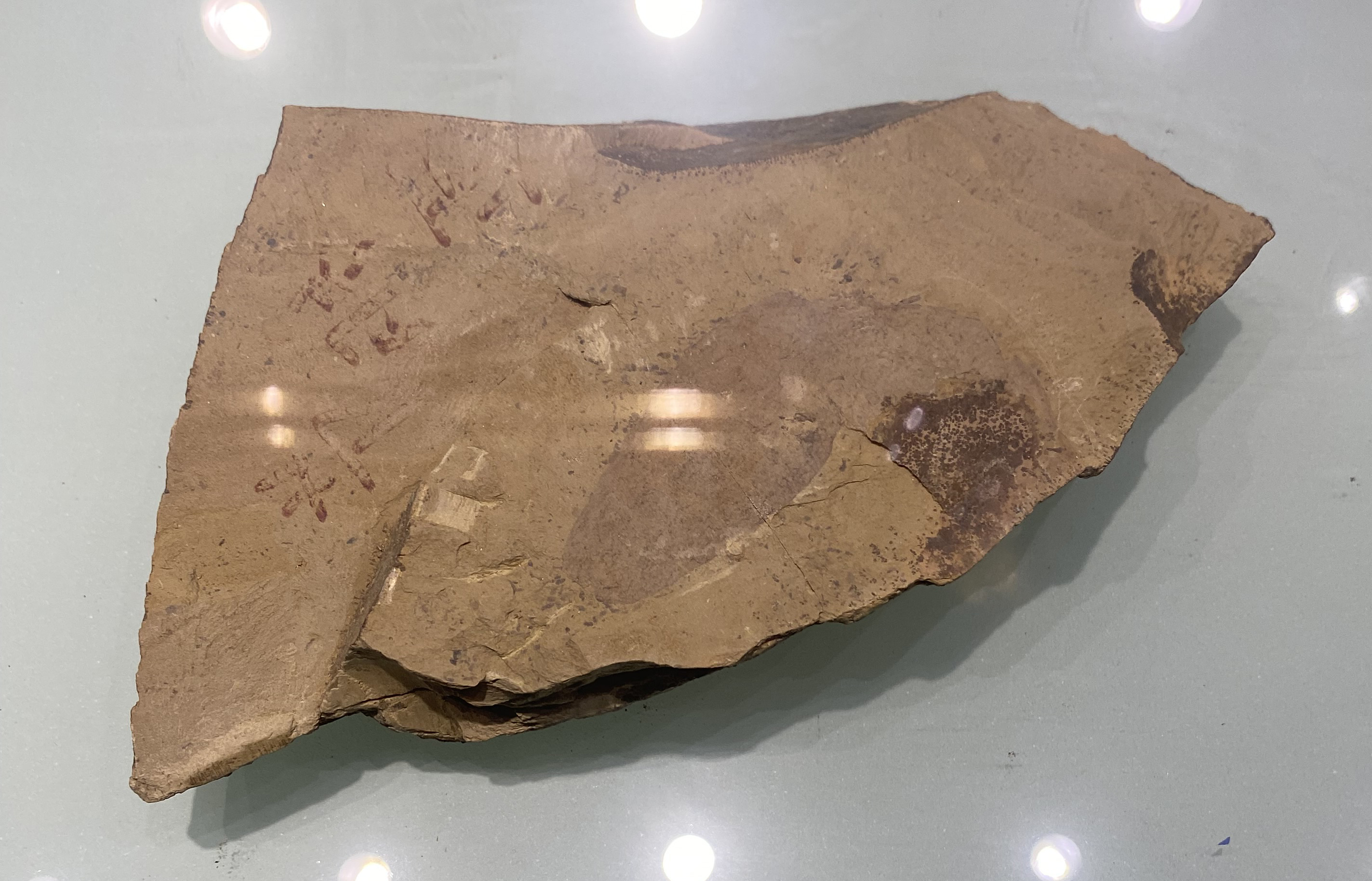
- Fossil of H. longicaudatus (=? H. confusus) in Yuxi Museum

Scientific classification
- Kingdom: Animalia
- Phylum: Chordata
- Clade?: †Vetulicolia
- Class: †Banffozoa
- Order: †Banffiata
- Family: †Banffiidae
- Genus: †Heteromorphus; Luo and Hu in Luo et al. 1999

Type species
- †H. longicaudatus (=? †H. confusus) Luo and Hu in Luo et al. 1999

Species
- †Heteromorphus confusus Chen and Zhou, 1997

= Heteromorphus =

Heteromorphus Temporal range: Cambrian Stage 3 Cambrian Stage 3

Extinct genus of Cambrian organisms

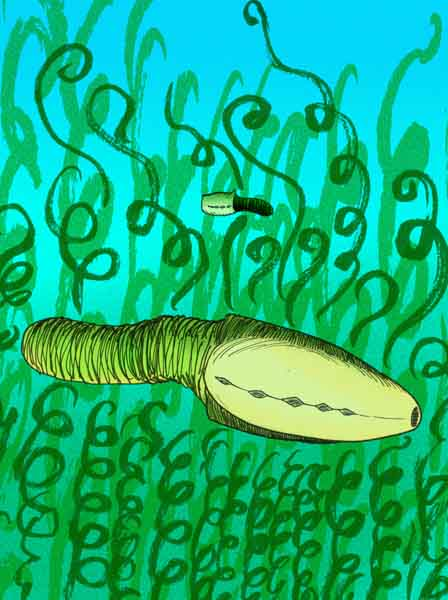
Artist's reconstruction of Heteromorphus longicaudatus (with much smaller "Form A" above it)

Heteromorphus is an extinct genus of banffiid from the lower Cambrian Chengjiang lagerstatte. It contains one broadly accepted species, Heteromorphus confusus, as well as a proposed junior synonym, Heteromorphus longicaudatus that may prove to be a separate species as additional specimens are examined. A much smaller species labeled "Form A" is allied with Heteromorphus at the class level but has not been formally described or assigned to Heteromorphus itself.

== Description ==
Like Banffia, Heteromorphus has a two-part body with a notable constriction between the parts, and a crossover that effectively reverses the dorsal and ventral sides between the anterior and posterior sections. The posterior portion is segmented, although the common presence of wrinkling makes counting the segments difficult. The anterior body shape ranges from torpedo-like to more rectangular, with a near-vertical anterior edge.

Heteromorphus is separated from Banffia by the presence of a lateral groove, similar to that found in the Vetulicolida. However, while a 2004 description claimed that four gill openings were present in the groove, later workers have not observed them. The lack of visible gills in banffiids has been speculated to indicate a burrowing lifestyle. A partial "twist" has been described in Heteromorphus, compared to the well-developed torsion in Banffia. While the initial description of H. confusus indicated an anus halfway along the ventral surface of the posterior section, later descriptions confirmed the terminal location of the anus.

== Taxonomy ==
Heteromorphus has been grouped with Banffia and Skeemella in the family Banffiidae.

The following cladogram is simplified from Mussini et al. (2024), using the definition of Vetulicolidae from Li et al. (2018). It shows Heteromorphus as part of the earliest steps, corresponding to the class Banffozoa, in the evolutionary grade leading to extant chordates.

- Chordata (total group)
  - Banffia†
  - Heteromorphus†
  - - Skeemella†
    - - Nesonektris†
      - - Vetulicolidae†
        - - Didazoon†
          - Pomatrum†
          - Yuyuanozoon†
          - - Yunnanozoon†
            - - Cathaymyrus†
              - Pikaia†
              - Chordata
                (crown group)

An earlier study in 2014 placed vetulicolians as the sister-group to tunicates, but was unable to resolve any relationships among vetulicolians as a group:

- Vetulicolia†
  - Vetulicola†
  - Beidazoon†
  - Ooedigera†
  - Pomatrum† / Xidazoon†
  - Didazoon†
  - Yuyuanozoon†
  - Banffia†
  - Heteromorphus†
  - Nesonektris†
- Tunicata

=== H. confusus vs H. longicaudatus ===
H. confusus was originally described as Banffia confusa in 1997, while H. longicaudatus was described and assigned to the new genus Heteromorphus in 1999. The discoverers of B. confusa referred to it as H. confusus in 2002, accepting its assignment to Heteromorphus and, according to a comprehensive 2007 review of vetulicolian phylogenetics, indicating that H. longicaudatus is its junior synonym. However, the same review also noted substantial variation among Heteromorphus specimens, and that more species may exist. Specifically, the review notes that the holotype of H. longicaudatus has a different shape than the holotype of H. confusus, suggesting that there may be reason to retain H. longicaudatus as a distinct species.
