= Eolarva =

Eolarva Temporal range: Fortunian, 535 Ma

Scientific classification
- Kingdom: Animalia
- Clade: Protostomia
- Superphylum: Ecdysozoa
- Genus: †Eolarva; Zhang & Dong, 2015
- Species: †E. kuanchuanpuensis

Binomial name
- †Eolarva kuanchuanpuensis Zhang & Dong, 2015

Extinct genus of stem-group ecdysozoans

Eolarva is an extinct monospecific genus of ecdysozoa that lived during the Fortunian age of the Cambrian, around 535 million years ago. It has been suggested to be a stem-group ecdysozoan, an intermediate between saccorhytids and crown-group ecdysozoans.

It contains a single species, Eolarva kuanchuanpuensis.
