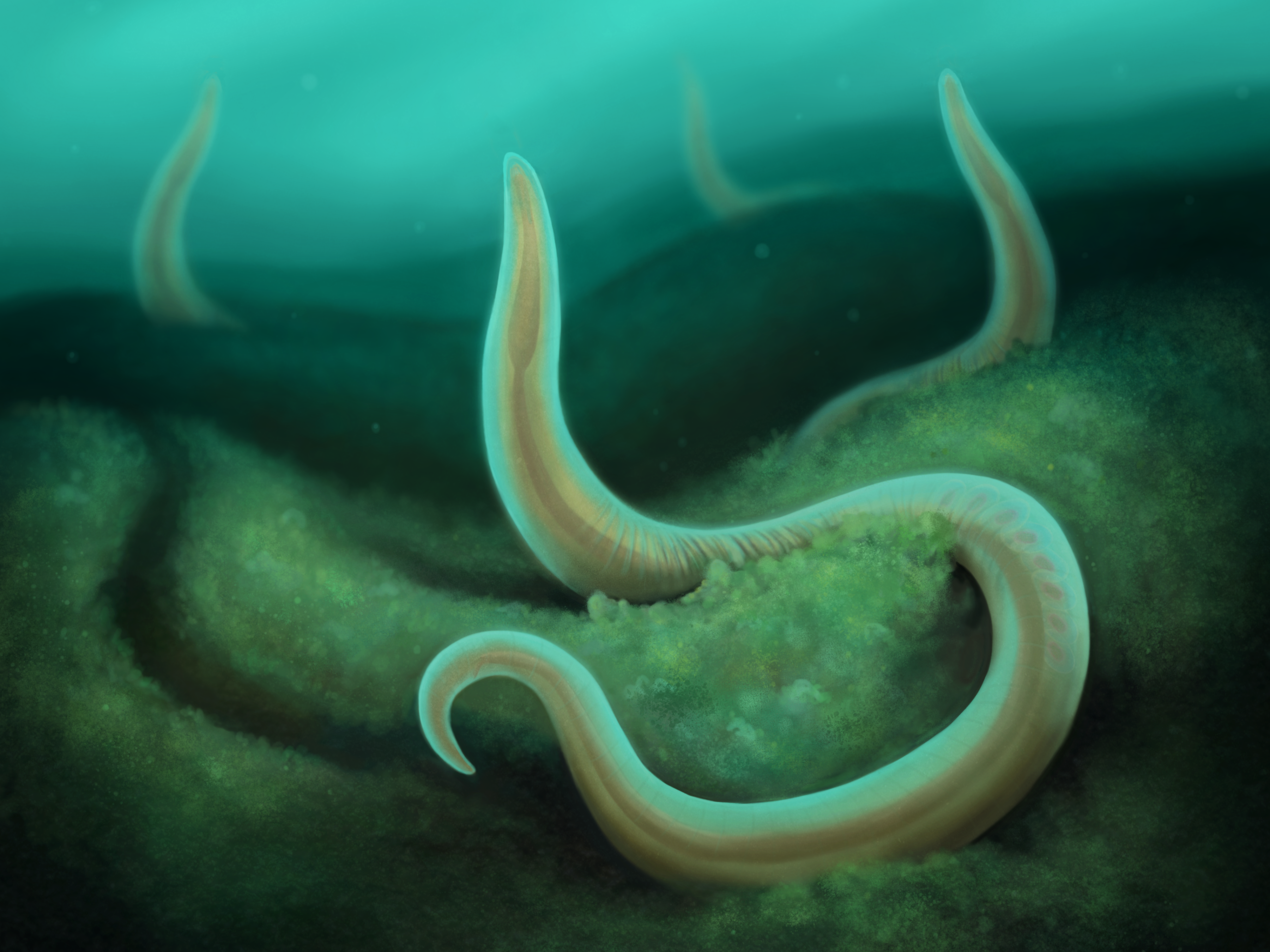
- Artist's interpretation of U. dzaugisi

Scientific classification
- Kingdom: Animalia
- Superphylum: Ecdysozoa
- Genus: †Uncus
- Species: †U. dzaugisi

Binomial name
- †Uncus dzaugisi Hughes et al., 2024

= Uncus dzaugisi =

Uncus dzaugisi Temporal range: late Ediacaran ~560–550 Ma

Extinct Ediacaran animal

Uncus dzaugisi was an organism which lived approximately 560 to 550 million years ago during the late Ediacaran in what is now Southern Australia and Newfoundland and Labrador. Its smooth cylindrical shape, with one end being wider than the other, suggests that it was a member of the clade Ecdysozoa (a group containing arthropods, nematodes and tardigrades, amongst others). If true, this makes it the oldest ecdysozoan known so far, as well as one of the oldest known bilaterians. It is currently the only member of the genus Uncus.

== Discovery and name ==
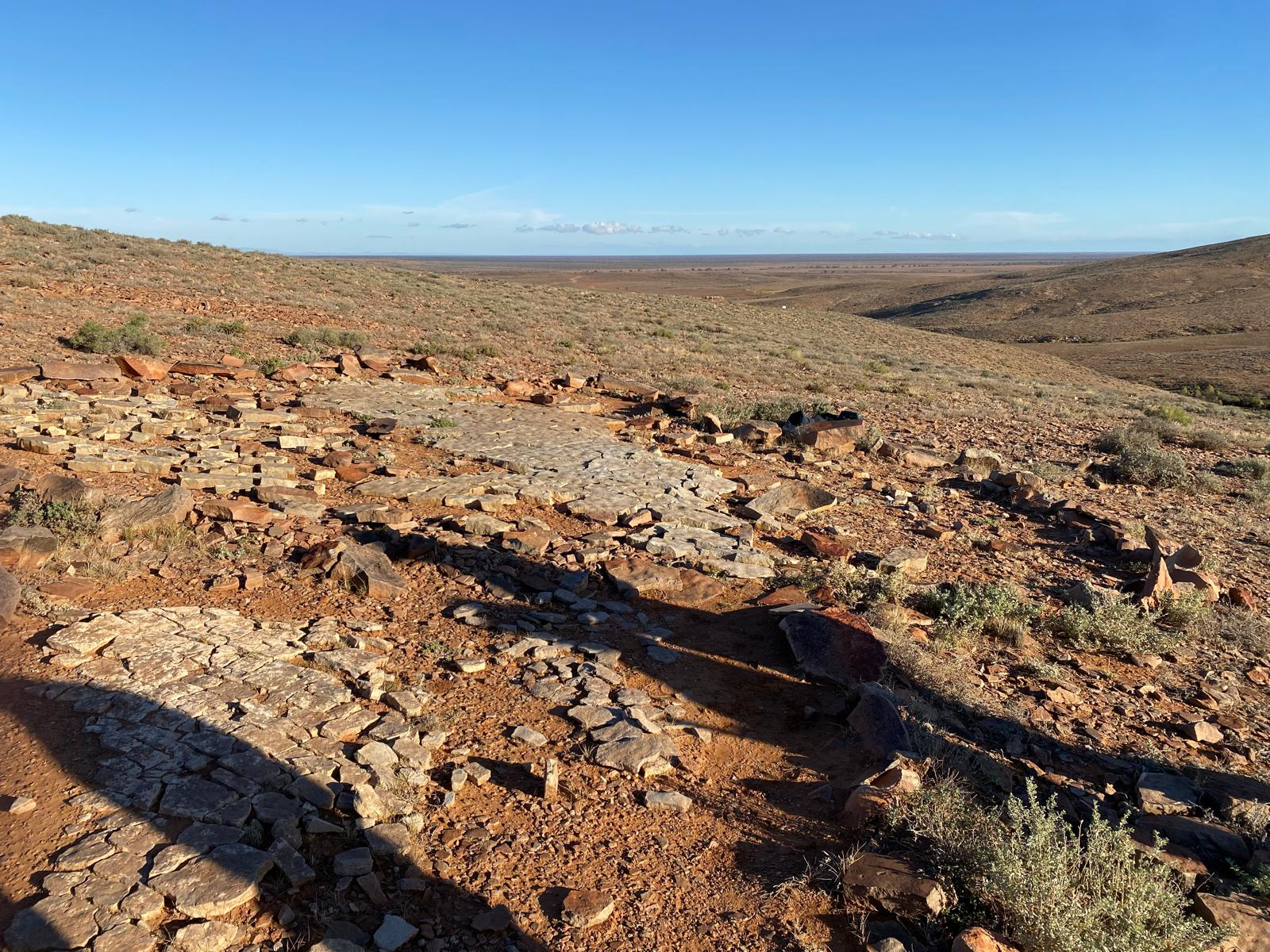
Fossil bed at Nilpena Ediacara National Park, where Uncus was discovered

The systematic excavation that led to the discovery of Uncus began in 2018 in the Ediacara Member, a rock unit of the Rawnsley Quartzite within the Nilpena Ediacara National Park, South Australia, which is known for its well preserved Ediacaran fossils. During the excavation, the team, led by Mary Droser, noted the presence of deep, hook-shaped indentations in the rock. At first, they were not looked into with much interest, but after discovering dozens of similar specimens, the team began to investigate them further. The discovery of trace fossils in nearby sediments supported the hypothesis that the indentations were indeed fossils of a previously unknown organism. Further specimens have also been recorded from the Inner Meadow Lagerstätte in Newfoundland and Labrador, Canada.

Uncus dzaugisi was scientifically described in 2024 by Ian V. Hughes and colleagues. The genus name that was chosen, Uncus, is derived from the Latin word uncus, meaning 'hooked', in reference to the shape of many specimens. The specific name dzaugisi is the Latinisation of the surname of Mary, Matthew and Peter Dzaugis and honors their contributions to fieldwork at the Nilpena Ediacara National Park.

== Description and paleobiology ==
Uncus was a soft-bodied, smooth and cylindrical organism that grew from 6 to 31 mm (0.2 to 1.2 in) in length, with a width of 0.7 to 2.4 mm (0.0 to 0.1 in). Specimens of Uncus have varying degrees of curvature, with one end being wider than the other, suggesting anterior-posterior differentiation. However, it is difficult to determine which of the ends is the anterior (front) or posterior (rear). This comes as some ecdysozoans, such as priapulids, have wider posteriors than anteriors, largely eliminating the assumption of the wider end being the anterior. Unlike most other Ediacaran organisms, which leave relatively thin impressions and deform easily, Uncus possibly had a sturdy external membrane, as evidenced by 77 out of the 82 specimens showing little to no deformation, and also leaving very deep impressions.

The sharpness of the fossil edges also suggests that Uncus was free from the organic mats that covered the seabeds of Ediacaran Australia, showing that it was most likely motile, unlike sessile organisms which have softer margins due to the microbial mat growing on them. Its motility is further supported by the existence of the ichnogenus Multina on one of the fossil beds where Uncus specimens were found, which U. dzaugisi is proposed to be the maker of. Several specimens have also been found overlaying other Ediacaran organisms, such as Funisia, and even the feeding traces of other motile organisms, such as Dickinsonia.

== Paleoecology ==
Uncus was discovered in the Ediacara Member of the Rawnsley Quartzite in the Nilpena Ediacara National Park, South Australia. The sediments that make up the fossil bed where deposited sometime around 560–550 million years ago, and are mostly composed of quartzite and sandstone. During that time, South Australia would have been a shallow marine environment with an abundance of microbial mats. With such a nutrition-rich environment, there were also many other organisms like Spriggina, Dickinsonia and Kimberella, which, much like Uncus, would probably have fed on the bountiful microbial mats. The microbial mats also likely aided in the preservation of several Ediacaran organisms by stabilizing the impressions left in the sediment.

== Affinity ==
Hughes and colleagues argue that Uncus was a member of Ecdysozoa, with possible relations to nematoids. This is supported by the sturdy membrane around the organism, which is possible evidence of an early cuticle. The overall morphology is consistent with both extant and fossil nematodes, especially ones that shallowly burrow within substrates. The hooked and rigid nature of the trace fossils are akin to the postmortem positions of modern nematodes. Alongside this, the differing widths of the trace fossils Multina, attributed to Uncus, bear resemblance to the locomotion of nematodes, which contract their muscles longitudinally to move along. However, a stylet or esophagus have not been preserved in any known specimens, which makes its assignment to Nematoida still contentious.

Other animal phyla, namely Annelida, Nemertea and Platyhelminthes (flatworms), have members with a similar form to Uncus. Despite the superficial similarity, Uncus has several distinguishing traits that makes affinity with these phyla unlikely. Annelids, more specifically Sipuncula and Echiura, rarely reach the sizes seen in Uncus. Uncus specimens also lack the defining feature of these clades, an introvert (proboscis-like structure). Nemerteans and flatworms are usually quite flat, whilst the deep imprints of Uncus suggest it was relatively girthy. The suggested contracting locomotion of Uncus also differs greatly from the smooth, gliding, locomotion seen in flatworms.

Alexander Liu argues that an affinity with Ecdysozoa is not certain, however, mainly due to the lack of any notable features that would firmly assign it to the clade. The fossil preservation methods of the Ediacaran also make it difficult to be certain that the fossils accurately represent the anatomy of an organism. The link between Uncus and its supposed trace fossils is also not definitive. Despite this, Liu still consideres Uncus to match expectations of a fossil nematoid in a sandstone substrate, and that it is still the best candidate for an Ediacaran ecdysozoan.

Many molecular clocks have estimated the origin of Ecdysozoa in the Ediacaran. If Uncus is indeed an ecdysozoan, it would be the first known Ediacaran example and would bridge the gap between the molecular clock estimates and the fossil record of Ecdysozoa, as well as the gap in the fossil record between the early bilaterians of the Ediacaran and the ecdysozoans like arthropods and priapulids otherwise first known from the Cambrian.
