= Clemente Formation =

Ediacaran geologic formation found in Sonora, Mexico

- Stratigraphic range: Ediacaran; 580–551 Ma
- Type: Geological formation
- Unit of: Caborca miogeoclinal sequence
- Underlies: Pitiquito Quartzite
- Overlies: Caborca Formation
- Thickness: 210 m (690 ft)

Lithology
- Primary: siltstone, sandstone, quartzite, and conglomerate
- Other: oolitic and aphanitic dolomite

Location
- Coordinates: 30°18′24″N 111°56′24″W
- Region: Cerro Rajon region, northern Sonora, Mexico
- Country: Mexico

Type section
- Named for: Cerro Clemente
- Named by: Stewart and others (1984)

The Clemente Formation is a geologic formation composed of 210 m (690 ft) of Ediacaran siltstone, sandstone, quartzite, conglomerate, and minor dolomite. It is exposed in the area of Cerro Rajon south of Caborca, northern Sonora, Mexico. It contains an oolitic dolomite marker bed correlated with the Johnnie Formation in Death Valley, California, and preserves an isotopic record of the Shuram excursion.

At its type section, the Clemente Formation consists of 210.3 m (690 ft) of siltstone, sandstone, quartzite, conglomerate, and minor dolomite exposed in the Cerro Rajon area. It is named for Cerro Clemente, Sonora, which lies about 11 km (6.8 mi) south-southwest of the location of its composite type section. Cerro Rajon lies about 2.3 km (1.4 mi) south-southeast of the type section.

== Lithology ==
At its type section, six informal stratigraphic subdivision (units) of the Clemente Formation are recognized. The bottommost subdivision, unit 1, consists of 63 m (207 ft) of pale red to grayish red siltstone to very fine grained quartzite. Its lowermost 15 m (49 ft) contains minor beds of light-brown dolomite. Overlying unit 1 is unit 2, which consists of 18 m (59 ft) of pale red, laminated and cross-bedded quartzite and granule conglomerate. The conglomerate of unit 2 contains mostly quartz gravel. Unit 3, which overlies unit 2, consists of 33 m (108 ft) of pale red, laminated to very thinly interbedded siltstone and very fine grained quartzite. Within the middle of unit 3, a layer of sandy limestone to dolomite occurs. Overlying unit 3 is 12.7 m (42 ft) of greenish gray, fine, siltstone of unit 4. Lying on top of unit 4, is unit 5. It consists of 2.6 m (8.5 ft) of very pale orange, interbedded oolitic dolomite, aphanitic dolomite, and intraclast conglomerate. The oolitic dolomite is a prominent regional marker bed. The conglomerate is composed of rounded clasts of oolitic dolomite. The uppermost subdivision of the Clemente Formation is unit 6. This unit consists of 81 m (266 ft) of pale red and greenish gray siltstone very fine grained sandstone which exhibits common drag marks, flute casts, and ripple marks. Two beds of intraclast conglomerate containing tabular siltstone clasts as large as 15 cm (5.9 in) in length occur within its lower 30 m (98 ft).

== Contacts ==
The Clemente Formation conformably overlies the Pitiquito Quartzite and underlies the Caborca Formation. The Pitiquito Quartzite is a 90 m-thick (295 ft), white to reddish-brown, fine- to medium-grained, thick-bedded, cross-stratified, cliff-forming quartzite. The Caborca Formation consists of an 85 m-thick (279 ft) lower slope-forming, greenish-gray and pale-red siltstone which contains minor amounts of gray and brown dolomite and an upper cliff-forming 20 m-thick (66 ft) dark-gray dolomite. These strata are part of a thick sequence of Neoproterozoic and Cambrian sedimentary strata, known as the Caborca miogeoclinal sequence, that lie upon Proterozoic metamorphic basement within the Caborca block (Caborca terrane).

== Distribution ==
The Clemente Formation is limited in distribution to a part of the Caborca Block south of Caborca, Sonora Province, Mexico. It outcrops along the rest of the Neoproterozoic and Cambrian strata of the Caborca miogeoclinal sequence as an inlier from which the surrounding and overlying Jurassic and Cretaceous sedimentary strata has been removed by erosion. The Clemente Formation outcrops on the east side of Cerro Calaveras and in the Cerros de la Cienega. Although they vary in thicknesses and dominant lithology between exposures, all of the 6 units of the Clemente Formation outcrop within Cerro Calaveras and in the Cerro de la Cienega. The Clemente Formation also outcrops in the Cerro Clemente and Cerro Llano Verde areas. A small outcrop exposing 110 m-thick (361 ft) of unit 6 of the Clemente Formation occurs in the northernmost part of Cerro El Arpa area where it is otherwise missing because of faulting.

== Fossils ==
Mark McMenamin has reported from the Clemente Formation a Neoproterozoic Ediacaran biome as well as trace fossils and new taxa of enigmatic fossils. Ben Waggoner has questioned whether these are fossils. He also noted that they predate the majority of Ediacaran biota by at least 50 million years.

== Depositional environments ==
As part of the Neoproterozoic to Cambrian Caborca miogeoclinal sequence outcropping near the town of Caborca, Mexico, the Clemente Formation is regarded as to have accumulated in shallow marine depositional environments generally no deeper than continental shelf depths. As with the rest of the Caborca miogeoclinal sequence, it likely was located on a passive margin that formed part of the edge of Laurentia.

== Age ==
The oolitic dolomite is currently correlated with the oolite marker bed in the Johnnie Formation in Death Valley, California based on lithology and similarity of associated sedimentary sequence above and below it. In addition, the oolite bed is the only bed with significant percentage of calcite within a predominantly dolomitic sequence of sedimentary rocks. Both oolite beds also record an increase in carbonate associated sulfate associated with the Shuram carbon isotope excursion. Based on this correlation with the well-dated Johnnie Formation in Death Valley and the presence of the Shuram carbon isotope excursion indicates that the age of the Clemente Formation lies between 580 and 551 Ma.

== See also ==
- List of fossiliferous stratigraphic units in Mexico
- Mark McMenamin
