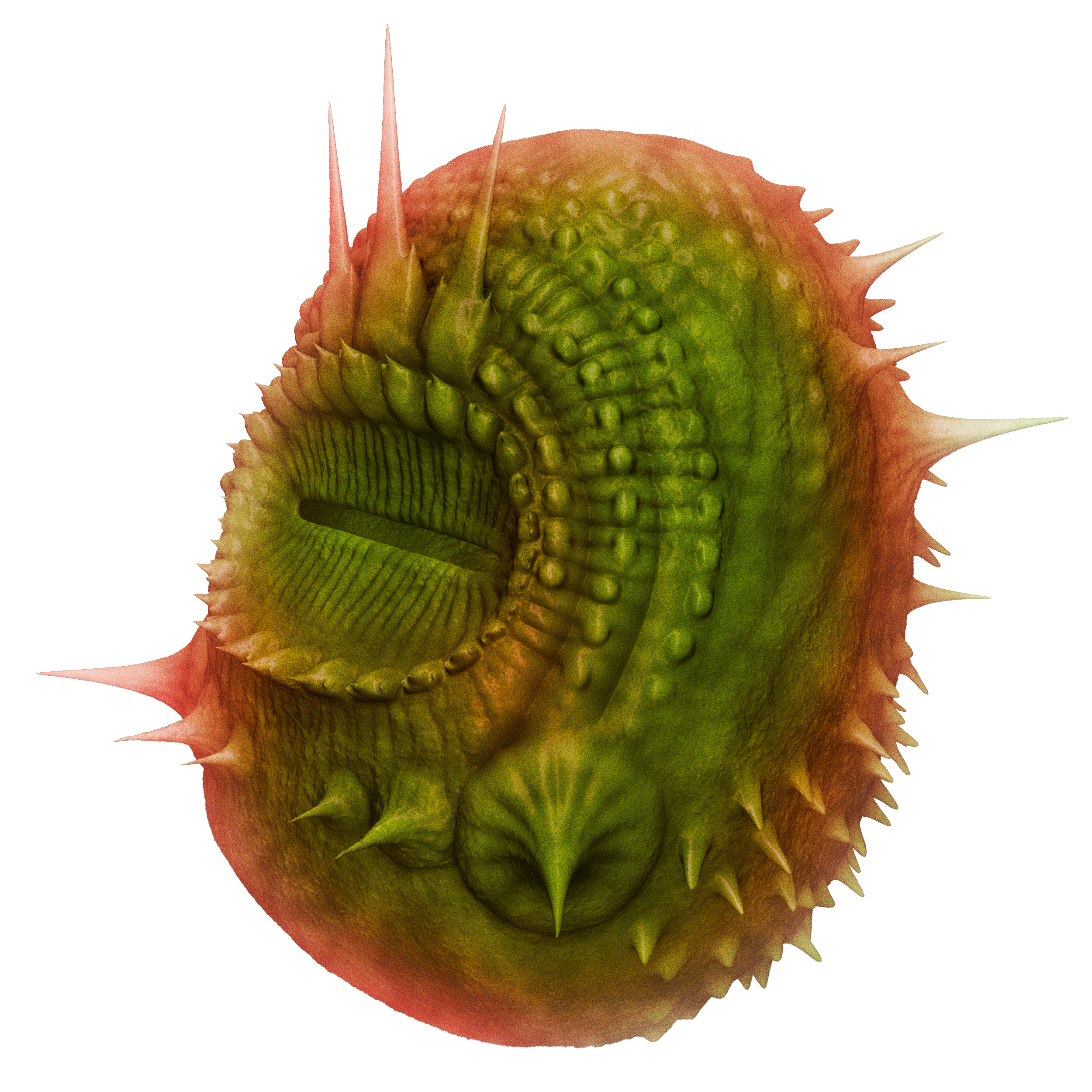
- A digital reconstruction of Saccorhytus coronarius.
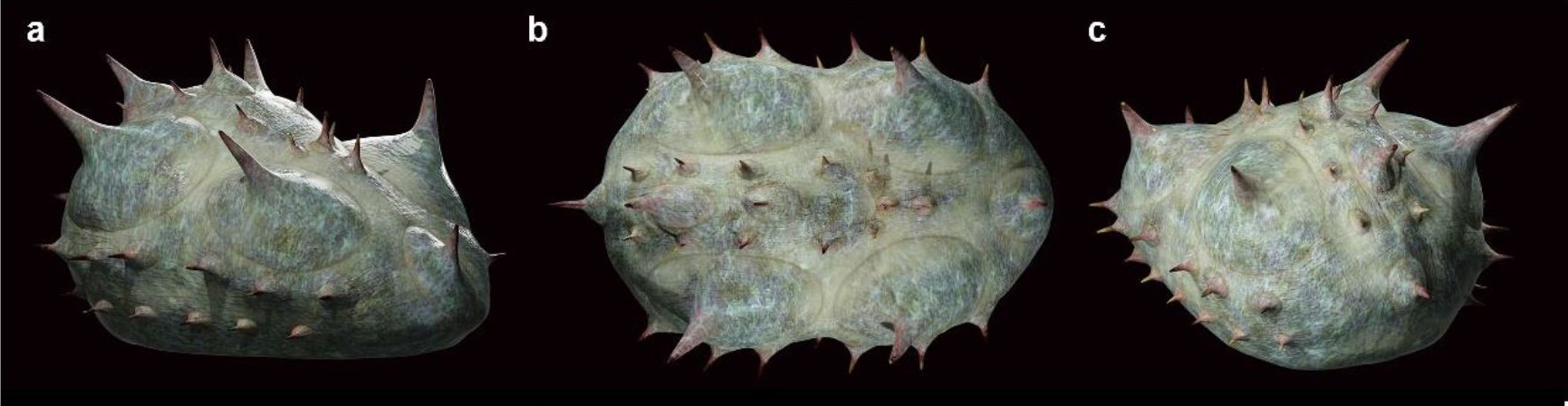
- 3D reconstruction of Beretella spinosa

Scientific classification
- Kingdom: Animalia
- Subkingdom: Eumetazoa
- Clade: ParaHoxozoa
- Clade: Bilateria
- Clade: Nephrozoa
- Clade: Protostomia
- Superphylum: Ecdysozoa
- Phylum: †Saccorhytida; Han et al., 2017

Genera
- †Saccorhytus Han et al., 2017; †Beretella Wang et al., 2024; †Clypecella Li, 1988 (?)

= Saccorhytida =

Saccorhytida Temporal range: Fortunian

Extinct phylum of marine invertebrates

Saccorhytida is an extinct phylum (previously considered an order or unranked clade) of Cambrian animals possibly belonging to the superphylum Ecdysozoa. It contains three monotypic genera: its namesake Saccorhytus, Beretella, and the dubious Clypecella. All three genera are found in the early Cambrian of China.
