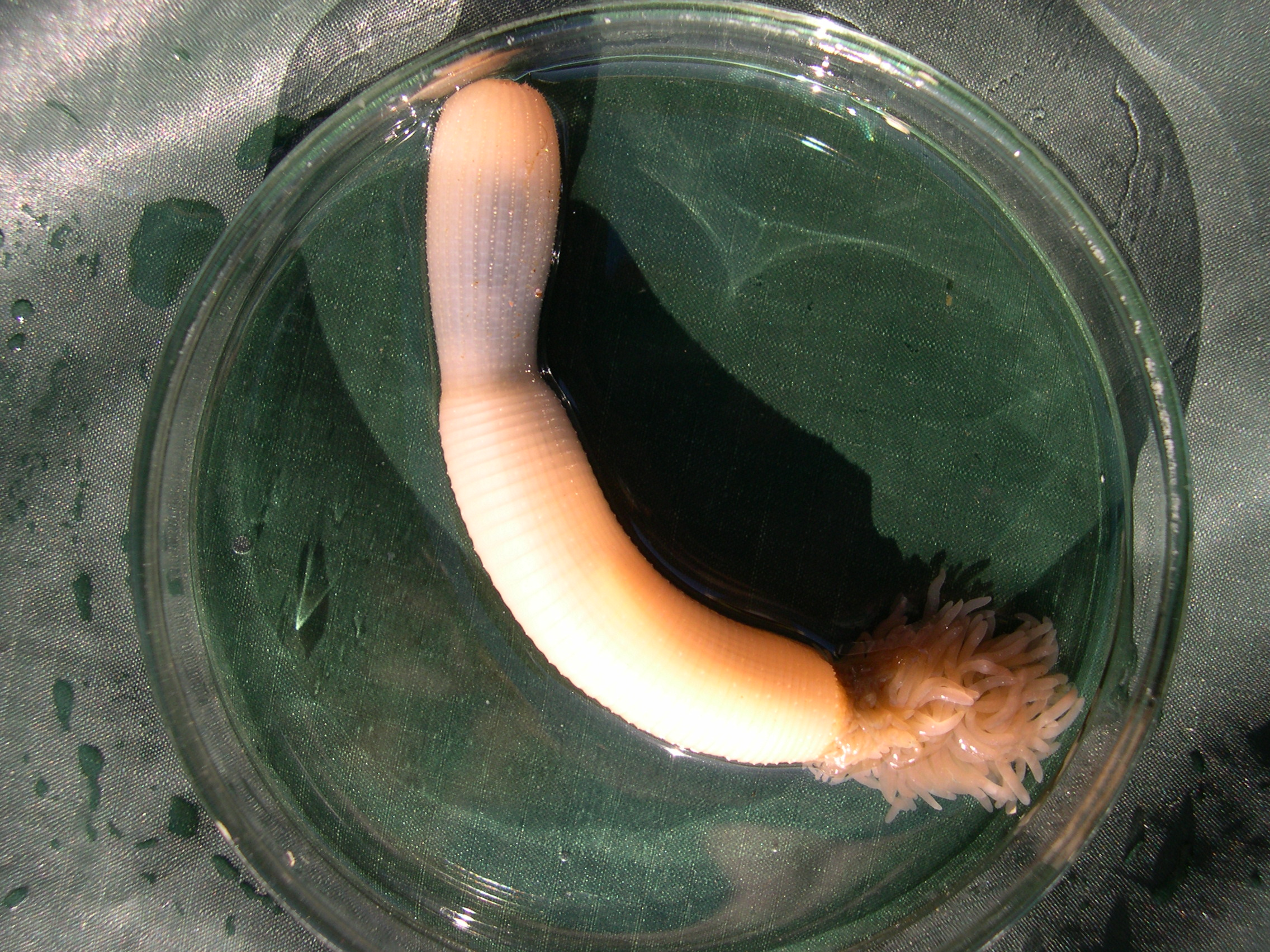
- Priapulus caudatus

Scientific classification
- Kingdom: Animalia
- Subkingdom: Eumetazoa
- Clade: ParaHoxozoa
- Clade: Bilateria
- Clade: Nephrozoa
- Clade: Protostomia
- Superphylum: Ecdysozoa
- (unranked): Cycloneuralia

Subclades
- Nematoida; Nematoda; Nematomorpha; †Palaeoscolecida; †Chalazoscolecidae; etc.; Scalidophora; Kinorhyncha; Priapulida; Loricifera

= Cycloneuralia =

Cycloneuralia Temporal range: Early Cambrian–Recent

Proposed clade of ecdysozoan animals

Cycloneuralia is a proposed clade of ecdysozoan animals including the Scalidophora (kinorhynchans, loriciferans, priapulids), the Nematoida (nematodes, nematomorphs), and the extinct palaeoscolecids. It may be paraphyletic, or may be a sister group to Panarthropoda. Or perhaps Panarthropoda is paraphyletic with respect to Cycloneuralia. The group has also been considered a single phylum, sometimes given the old name Nemathelminthes. The uniting character is the nervous system organization with a circumpharyngeal brain and somata–neuropil–somata pattern. The name derives from the position of the brain around the pharynx.
