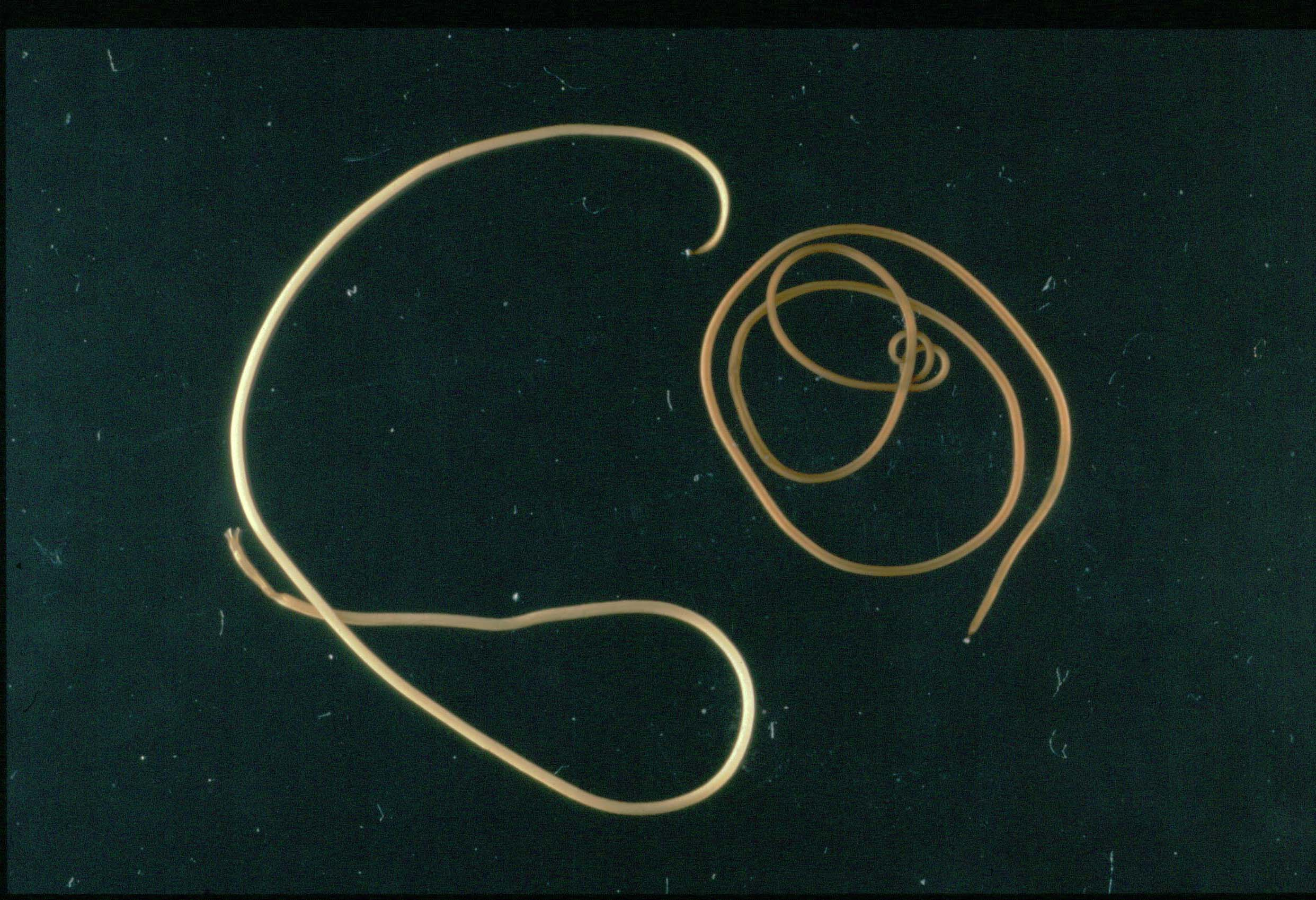
- Paragordius tricuspidatus

Scientific classification
- Kingdom: Animalia
- Subkingdom: Eumetazoa
- Clade: ParaHoxozoa
- Clade: Bilateria
- Clade: Nephrozoa
- Clade: Protostomia
- Superphylum: Ecdysozoa
- Clade: Nematoida; Schmidt-Rhaesa, 1996

Subdivisions
- Nematomorpha; Nematoda; †Uncus?

Synonyms
- Nematoidea sensu lato Rudolphi, 1808; Nematozoa Zrzavý et al., 1998

= Nematoida =

Nematoida Temporal range: Devonian–Recent Possible Ediacaran records

Clade of worm-like animals

Nematoida is a clade of pseudocoelomate free living or parasitic animals. It consists of phyla Nematoda and Nematomorpha. The two groups share a number of features in common; the presence of a cloaca in both sexes, aflagellate sperm, and a cuticle made of collagen.

Its position within Ecdysozoa is uncontroversial, but the identity of their closest relatives has been debated. Under the Cycloneuralia hypothesis, the nematoids are considered to be closest to Scalidophora, named for the ring-shaped brains found in these animals. However, this group has seen less support in phylogenetic analyses, with the Cryptovermes hypothesis being more consistently supported, which groups the nematoids with the panarthropods, although the issue is still not completely settled.
