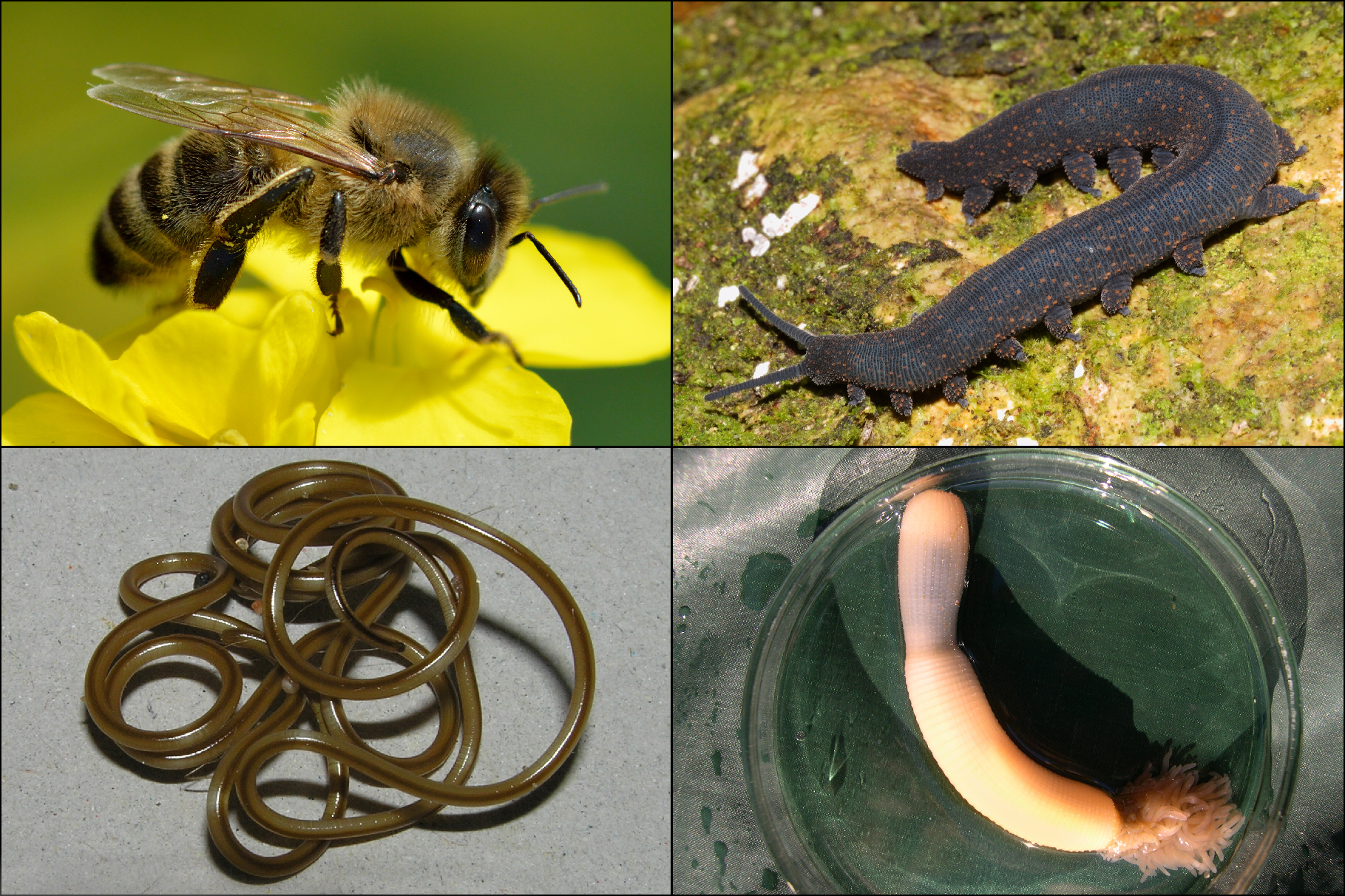

Scientific classification
- Kingdom: Animalia
- Subkingdom: Eumetazoa
- Clade: ParaHoxozoa
- Clade: Bilateria
- Clade: Nephrozoa
- Clade: Protostomia
- Superphylum: Ecdysozoa; Aguinaldo et al., 1997

Phyla
- Scalidophora; Kinorhyncha; Priapulida; Loricifera; †Dahescolex; †Dakorhachis?; †Qinscolex; †Shanscolex; †Xinliscolex; †Zhongpingscolex; †Palaeoscolecida; Cryptovermes; Nematoida; Nematoda; Nematomorpha; †Uncus?; Panarthropoda; Arthropoda; Onychophora; Tardigrada; †"Lobopodia"; †Sialomorphidae; †Acosmia; †Eolarva; †Laojieella; †Saccorhytida; †Saccus; †Spinosoma

= Ecdysozoa =

Ecdysozoa Temporal range: Ediacaran - Holocene, 560–0 Ma (Earliest age estimates range from 636 to 578 Ma (Cryogenian–Ediacaran boundary to mid- to late Ediacaran) based on molecular clock)

Superphylum of protostomes

Ecdysozoa (/ˌɛkdɪsoʊˈzoʊə/) is a group of protostome animals, including Arthropoda (insects, chelicerates (including arachnids), crustaceans, and myriapods), Nematoda, and several smaller phyla. The grouping of these animal phyla into a single clade was first proposed by Eernisse et al. (1992) based on a phylogenetic analysis of 141 morphological characters of ultrastructural and embryological phenotypes. This clade, that is, a group consisting of a common ancestor and all its descendants, was formally named by Aguinaldo et al. in 1997, based mainly on phylogenetic trees constructed using 18S ribosomal RNA genes.

A large study in 2008 by Dunn et al. strongly supported the monophyly of Ecdysozoa.

The group Ecdysozoa is supported by many morphological characters, including growth by ecdysis, with moulting of the cuticle – without mitosis in the epidermis – under control of the prohormone ecdysone, and internal fertilization.

The group was initially contested by a significant minority of biologists. Some argued for groupings based on more traditional taxonomic techniques, while others contested the interpretation of the molecular data.

== Etymology ==
The name Ecdysozoa is scientific Greek, derived from ἔκδυσις (ékdusis) "shedding" + ζῷον (zôion) "animal".

== Characteristics ==
The most notable characteristic shared by ecdysozoans is a three-layered cuticle (four in Tardigrada) composed of organic material, which is periodically molted as the animal grows. This process of molting is called ecdysis, and gives the group its name. The ecdysozoans lack locomotory cilia and produce mostly amoeboid sperm, and their embryos do not undergo spiral cleavage as in most other protostomes. Ancestrally, the group exhibited sclerotized teeth within the foregut, and a ring of spines around the mouth opening, though these features have been secondarily lost in certain groups. An unpaired ventral nerve cord, present in Priapulida and Nematoida, appear to be the ancestral condition, making the paired ventral nerve cord found in Panarthropoda, Kinorhyncha and Loricifera a derived trait. A respiratory and circulatory system is only present in onychophorans and arthropods (often absent in smaller arthropods like mites); in the rest of the groups, both systems are missing. Ecdysozoans rely exclusively on the arginine phosphate/arginine kinase (AP/AK) system, a high-energy phosphate system used to regenerate ATP from ADP. In contrast, vertebrates use only the creatine phosphate/creatine kinase (CP/CK) system, while some other invertebrates may employ both systems.

== Phylogeny ==
The Ecdysozoa include the following phyla: Arthropoda, Onychophora, Tardigrada, Kinorhyncha, Priapulida, Loricifera, Nematoda, and Nematomorpha. A few extinct taxa have been classified as stem group ecdysozoans, such as Uncus dzaugisi and Acosmia. Other groups such as the gastrotrichs, have been considered possible members but lack the main characters of the group, and are now placed elsewhere. The Arthropoda, Onychophora, and Tardigrada have been grouped together as the Panarthropoda because they are distinguished by segmented body plans. Dunn et al. in 2008 suggested that the tardigrada could be grouped along with the nematodes, leaving Onychophora as the sister group to the arthropods. The non-panarthropod members of Ecdysozoa have been grouped as Cycloneuralia but they are more usually considered paraphyletic in representing the primitive condition from which the Panarthropoda evolved.

A modern consensus phylogenetic tree for Ecdysozoa is shown below, mainly based on the one supported by Giribet & Edgecombe (2017), which summarizes relationships found in recent ecdysozoan phylogenies:

- Protostomia
  - Ecdysozoa
    - Priapulida
    - Kinorhyncha
    - Loricifera
    - Nematoida
      - Nematoda
      - Nematomorpha
    - Panarthropoda
      - Tardigrada
      - - Arthropoda
        - Onychophora
  - Spiralia

== Older alternative groupings ==
=== Articulata hypothesis ===
The grouping proposed by Aguinaldo et al. is almost universally accepted, replacing an older hypothesis that Panarthropoda should be classified with Annelida in a group called the Articulata, and that Ecdysozoa are polyphyletic. Nielsen has suggested that a possible solution is to regard Ecdysozoa as a sister-group of Annelida, though later considered them unrelated. Inclusion of the roundworms within the Ecdysozoa was initially contested but since 2003, a broad consensus has formed supporting the Ecdysozoa and in 2011 the Darwin–Wallace Medal was awarded to James Lake for the discovery of the New Animal Phylogeny consisting of the Ecdysozoa, the Lophotrochozoa, and the Deuterostomia.

=== Coelomata hypothesis ===
Before Aguinaldo's Ecdysozoa proposal, one of the prevailing theories for the evolution of the bilateral animals was based on the morphology of their body cavities. There were three types, or grades of organization: the Acoelomata (no coelom), the Pseudocoelomata (partial coelom), and the Eucoelomata (true coelom). Adoutte and coworkers were among the first to strongly support the Ecdysozoa. With the introduction of molecular phylogenetics, the coelomate hypothesis was abandoned, although some molecular, phylogenetic support for the Coelomata continued until as late as 2005.
