= Cambrian explosion =

Period of major evolutionary diversification of animal life

The Cambrian explosion (also known as the Cambrian radiation or Cambrian diversification) is a major evolutionary radiation event of the Earth's lifeforms beginning approximately 538.8 million years ago in the early Cambrian period of the Paleozoic era, during which a sudden diversification of complex life occurred in the fossil record. The radiations occurred following the Baykonurian glaciation and the End-Ediacaran extinction and marked a significantly different faunal pattern from the earlier Ediacaran biota, with fossil evidence from this period containing all five modern metazoan (animal) phyla, implying the first major radiation of all these clades except the poriferans (i.e. sponges, which first appeared much earlier at least during the preceding Ediacaran period and possibly as early as the Tonian period). It lasted between 13 million and 25 million years before ending at the Sinsk Event, and resulted in the divergence of most extant eumetazoan phyla.

Before early Cambrian diversification, (Note: At 610 million years ago, Aspidella disks appeared, but it is not clear that these represented complex life forms.) most organisms were relatively simple soft-bodied marine life composed of individual cells or small multicellular clusters, occasionally organized into colonies. Majority of the Precambrian metazoans that radiated during the preceding Avalon explosion (i.e. the Ediacaran biota) were simple-bodied, sessile filter feeders (e.g. the frondomorphs) or relatively sedentary epibenthic microbivores (e.g. the proarticulates and trilobozoans); while a large portion of the Cambrian faunae were far more mobile bottom feeders and demersal nektons with far more complex body plans, most notably the presence of neurons and similar excitable cells. The Cambrian substrate revolution, which was marked by oxidative degradation of the organic microbial mat due to increased burrowing by endobenthic bilaterians into the seabed, further catalyzed the ecological succession by selecting organisms more capable of motility, bioerosion and predation. As the subsequent evolutionary arms race accelerated the rate of diversification, speciation became more complex and the variety of life began to resemble that seen today, with notable phyla including arthropods (most notably trilobites and dinocaridids), lophophorates (brachiopods and bryozoans), cnidarians (jellyfish and corals), echinoderms, vetulicolians and earliest chordates such as Pikaia, Yunnanozoon and Cathaymyrus, which later gave rise to lancelets, tunicates and early vertebrates such as the myllokunmingiids. The event was also accompanied by major diversification in other groups of organisms such as phytoplanktons and calcimicrobes.

The Cambrian explosion coincided with the evolution of mineralized tissues and skeletons, which are fossilizable and thus contributed greatly to the "explosive" abundance of fossil evidence in the early Cambrian while earlier Precambrian fossils are mostly mold, trace or chemical fossils instead of fossils proper. This had once led the academic society to mistakenly assume that no complex life had existed until they all "suddenly appeared" during the Cambrian, as seen by the term Phanerozoic (from Ancient Greek φανερός phanerós + ζωή zōḗ, meaning "visible life") coined in 1930 by the American geologist George Halcott Chadwick (1876–1953).

Key Cambrian explosion events
← / Orsten fauna; ← / Burgess Shale; ← / Kaili biota; ← / Archaeocyatha extinction; ← / Emu Bay Shale; ← / Sirius Passet biota; ← / Chengjiang biota; ← / First arthropods with mineralized carapace (Trilobites); ← / SSF diversification, first brachiopods & archaeocyatha; ← / First halkieriids, mollusсs, hyoliths SSF; ← / Treptichnus pedum Large negative δ^{13}C peak; ← / First Cloudina & Namacalathus mineral tubular fossils; ← / Mollusc-like Kimberella and its trace fossils; ← / Gaskiers glaciation Archaeonassa-type trace fossils

== History and significance ==
Life timeline
← / Earth formed; ← / Earliest water; ← / LUCA; ← / Earliest fossils; ← / Great Oxygenation Event; ← / Sexual reproduction; ← / Earliest fungi; ← / Neoproterozoic oxygenation event; ← / Ediacaran biota; ← / Cambrian explosion; ← / Earliest tetrapods; ← / Earliest hominoid
(million years ago)

The seemingly rapid appearance of fossils in the "Primordial Strata" was noted by William Buckland in the 1840s. Charles Darwin in his 1859 book On the Origin of Species discussed the then inexplicable lack of earlier fossils as one of the main difficulties for his theory of descent with slow modification through natural selection. The long-running puzzlement about the seemingly sudden appearance of the Cambrian fauna without evident precursor(s) centers on three key points: whether there really was a mass diversification of complex organisms over a relatively short period during the early Cambrian, what might have caused such rapid change, and what it would imply about the origin of animal life. Interpretation is difficult, owing to a limited supply of evidence based mainly on an incomplete fossil record and chemical signatures remaining in Cambrian rocks.

The first discovered Cambrian fossils were trilobites, described by Edward Lhuyd, the curator of the Oxford Museum, in 1698. Although their evolutionary importance was not known, on the basis of their old age William Buckland (1784–1856) realized that a dramatic step-change in the fossil record had occurred around the base of what we now call the Cambrian. Nineteenth-century geologists such as Adam Sedgwick and Roderick Murchison used the fossils for dating rock strata, specifically for establishing the Cambrian and Silurian periods. By 1859, leading geologists including Roderick Murchison were convinced that what was then called the lowest Silurian stratum showed the origin of life on Earth, though others, including Charles Lyell, differed. In On the Origin of Species, Darwin considered this sudden appearance of a solitary group of trilobites, with no apparent antecedents, and absent other fossils, to be "undoubtedly of the gravest nature" among the difficulties in his theory of natural selection. He reasoned that earlier seas had swarmed with living creatures, but that their fossils had not been found because of the imperfections of the fossil record. In the sixth edition of his book, he stressed his problem further as:

To the question why we do not find rich fossiliferous deposits belonging to these assumed earliest periods prior to the Cambrian system, I can give no satisfactory answer.

The American paleontologist Charles Walcott, who studied the Burgess Shale fauna, proposed that an interval of time, the "Lipalian", was not represented in the fossil record or did not preserve fossils, and that the ancestors of the Cambrian animals evolved during this time.

Earlier fossil evidence has since been found. The earliest claim is that the history of life on Earth goes back 3,850 million years: Rocks of that age at Warrawoona, Australia, were claimed to contain fossil stromatolites, stubby pillars formed by colonies of microorganisms. Fossils (Grypania) of more complex eukaryotic cells, from which all animals, plants and fungi are built, have been found in rocks from 1,400 million years ago, in China and Montana. Rocks dating from 580 to 543 million years ago contain fossils of the Ediacaran biota, organisms so large that they are likely multicelled, but very unlike any modern organism. In 1948, Preston Cloud argued that a period of "eruptive" evolution occurred in the Early Cambrian, but as recently as the 1970s, no sign was seen of how the 'relatively' modern-looking organisms of the Middle and Late Cambrian arose.

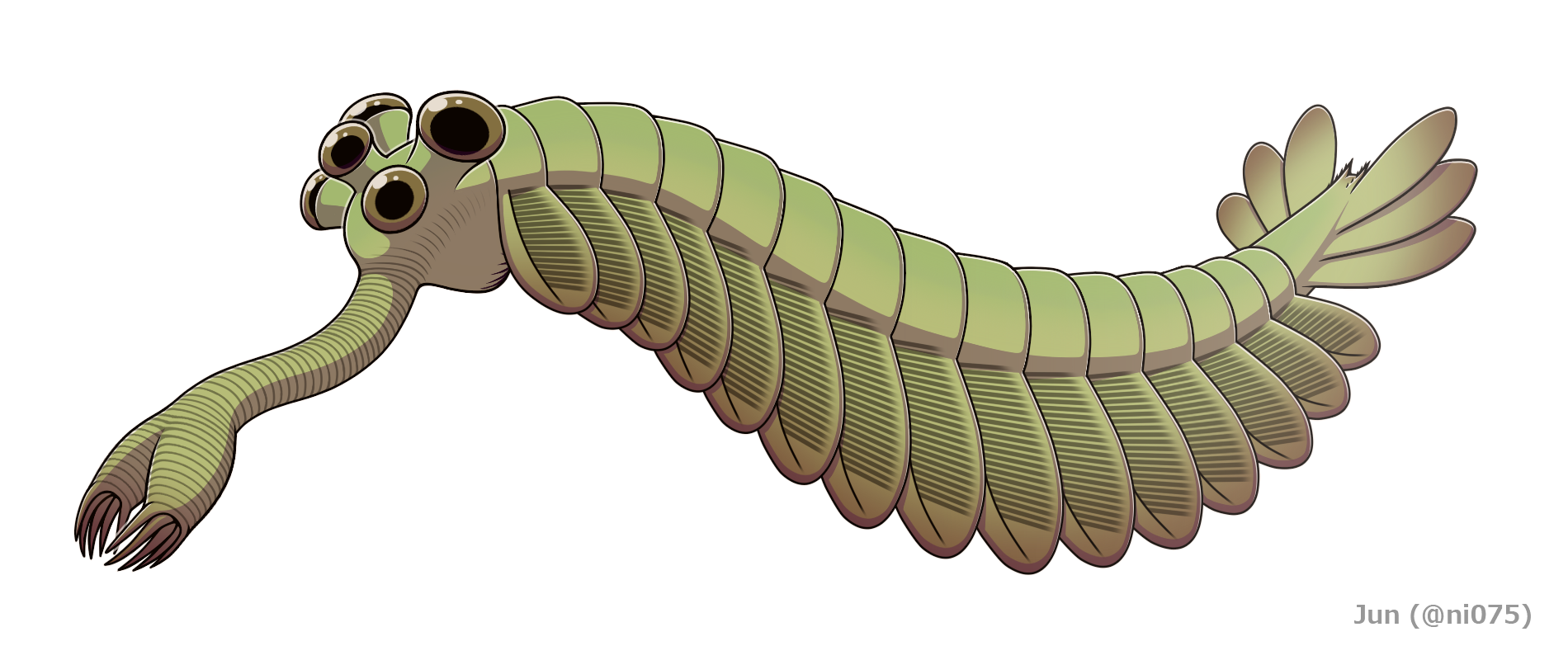
Opabinia made the largest single contribution to modern interest in the Cambrian explosion.

The intense modern interest in this "Cambrian explosion" was sparked by the work of Harry B. Whittington and colleagues, who, in the 1970s, reanalysed many fossils from the Burgess Shale and concluded that several were as complex as, but different from, any living animals. The most common organism, Marrella, was clearly an arthropod, but not a member of any known arthropod class. Organisms such as the five-eyed Opabinia and spiny slug-like Wiwaxia were so different from anything else known that Whittington's team assumed they must represent different phyla, seemingly unrelated to anything known today. Stephen Jay Gould's popular 1989 account of this work, Wonderful Life, brought the matter into the public eye and raised questions about what the explosion represented. While differing significantly in details, both Whittington and Gould proposed that all modern animal phyla had appeared almost simultaneously in a rather short span of geological period. This view led to the modernization of Darwin's tree of life and the theory of punctuated equilibrium, which Eldredge and Gould developed in the early 1970s and which views evolution as long intervals of near-stasis "punctuated" by short periods of rapid change.

Other analyses, some more recent and some dating back to the 1970s, argue that complex animals similar to modern types evolved well before the start of the Cambrian.

=== Dating the Cambrian ===
Radiometric dates for much of the Cambrian, obtained by analysis of radioactive elements contained within rocks, have only recently become available, and for only a few regions.

Relative dating (A was before B) is often assumed sufficient for studying processes of evolution, but this, too, has been difficult, because of the problems involved in matching up rocks of the same age across different continents.

Therefore, dates or descriptions of sequences of events should be regarded with some caution until better data becomes available. In 2004, the start of the Cambrian was dated to 542 Ma. In 2012, it was revised to 541 Ma then in 2022 it was changed again to 538.8 Ma.

Some theory suggest Cambrian explosion occurred during the last stages of Gondwanan assembly, which is formed following Rodinia splitting, overlapped with the opening of the Iapetus Ocean between Laurentia and western Gondwana. The largest Cambrian faunal province is located around Gondwana, which extended from the low northern latitudes to the high southern latitudes, just short of the South Pole. By the middle and later parts of the Cambrian, continued rifting had sent the paleocontinents of Laurentia, Baltica and Siberia on their separate ways.

=== Body fossils ===
Fossils of organisms' bodies are usually the most informative type of evidence. Fossilization is a rare event, and most fossils are destroyed by erosion or metamorphism before they can be observed. Hence, the fossil record is very incomplete, increasingly so as earlier times are considered. Despite this, it is often adequate to illustrate the broader patterns of life's history. Also, biases exist in the fossil record: different environments are more favourable to the preservation of different types of organism or parts of organisms. Further, only the parts of organisms that were already mineralised are usually preserved, such as the shells of molluscs. Since most animal species are soft-bodied, they decay before they can become fossilised. As a result, although 30-plus phyla of living animals are known, two-thirds have never been found as fossils.

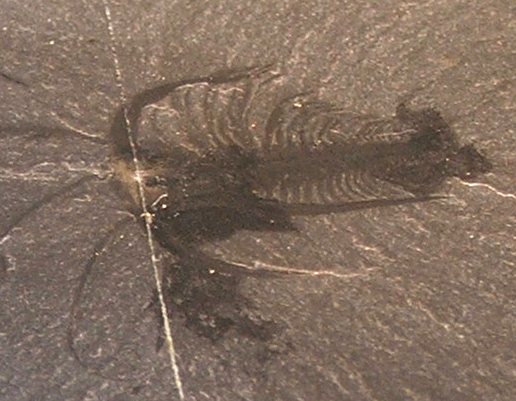
This Marrella specimen illustrates how clear and detailed the fossils from the Burgess Shale Lagerstätte actually are as well as the oldest evidence for liquid blood in an animal.

The Cambrian fossil record includes an unusually high number of lagerstätten, which preserve soft tissues. These allow paleontologists to examine the internal anatomy of animals, which in other sediments are only represented by shells, spines, claws, etc.—if they are preserved at all. The most significant Cambrian lagerstätten are the early Cambrian Maotianshan shale beds of Chengjiang (Yunnan, China) and Sirius Passet (Greenland), the middle Cambrian Burgess Shale (British Columbia, Canada) and the late Cambrian Orsten (Sweden) fossil beds.

While lagerstätten preserve far more than the conventional fossil record, they are far from complete. Because lagerstätten are restricted to a narrow range of environments (where soft-bodied organisms can be preserved very quickly, e.g. by mudslides), most animals are probably not represented; further, the exceptional conditions that create lagerstätten probably do not represent normal living conditions. In addition, the known Cambrian lagerstätten are rare and difficult to date, while Precambrian lagerstätten have yet to be studied in detail.

The sparseness of the fossil record means that organisms usually exist long before they are found in the fossil record—this is known as the Signor–Lipps effect.

In 2019, a "stunning" find of lagerstätten, known as the Qingjiang biota, was reported from the Danshui river in Hubei province, China. More than 20,000 fossil specimens were collected, including many soft bodied animals such as jellyfish, sea anemones and worms, as well as sponges, arthropods and algae. In some specimens the internal body structures were sufficiently preserved that soft tissues, including muscles, gills, mouths, guts and eyes, can be seen. The remains were dated to around 518 Mya and around half of the species identified at the time of reporting were previously unknown.

=== Trace fossils ===
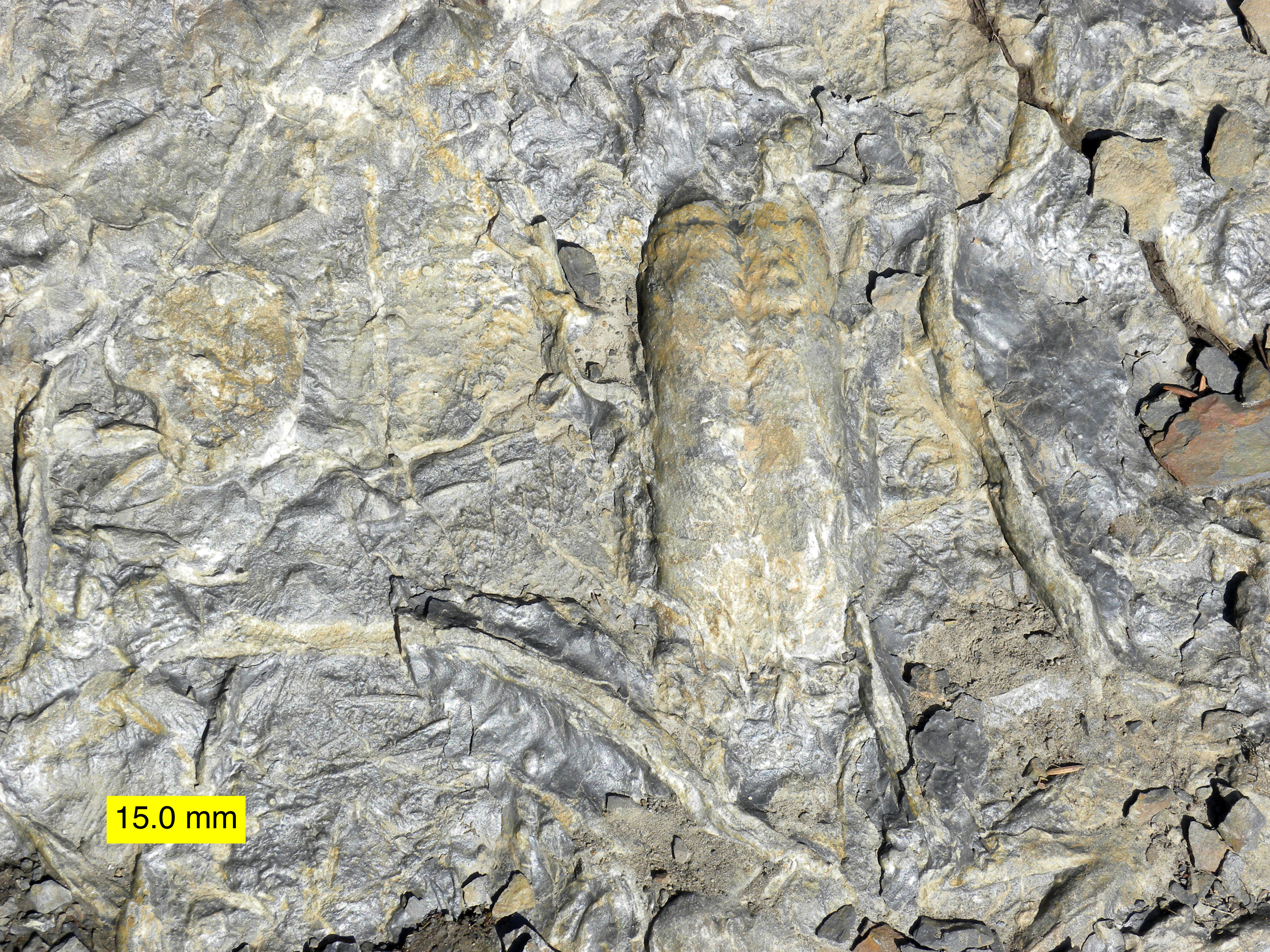
Rusophycus and other trace fossils from the Gog Group, Middle Cambrian, Lake Louise, Alberta, Canada

Trace fossils consist mainly of tracks and burrows, but also include coprolites (fossil feces) and marks left by feeding. Trace fossils are particularly significant because they represent a data source that is not limited to animals with easily fossilized hard parts, and reflects organisms' behaviour. Also, many traces date from significantly earlier than the body fossils of animals that are thought to have been capable of making them. While exact assignment of trace fossils to their makers is generally impossible, traces may, for example, provide the earliest physical evidence of the appearance of moderately complex animals (comparable to earthworms).

=== Geochemical observations ===
Several chemical markers indicate a drastic change in the environment around the start of the Cambrian. The markers are consistent with a mass extinction, or with a massive warming resulting from the release of methane ice. Such changes may reflect a cause of the Cambrian explosion, although they may also have resulted from an increased level of biological activity—a possible result of the explosion. Despite these uncertainties, the geochemical evidence helps by making scientists focus on theories that are consistent with at least one of the likely environmental changes.

=== Phylogenetic techniques ===
Cladistics is a technique for working out the "family tree" of a set of organisms. It works by the logic that, if groups B and C have more similarities to each other than either has to group A, then B and C are more closely related to each other than either is to A. Characteristics that are compared may be anatomical, such as the presence of a notochord, or molecular, by comparing sequences of DNA or protein. The result of a successful analysis is a hierarchy of clades—groups whose members are believed to share a common ancestor. The cladistic technique is sometimes problematic, as some features, such as wings or camera eyes, evolved more than once, convergently—this must be taken into account in analyses.

From the relationships, it may be possible to constrain the date that lineages first appeared. For instance, if fossils of B or C date to X million years ago and the calculated "family tree" says A was an ancestor of B and C, then A must have evolved more than X million years ago.

It is also possible to estimate how long ago two living clades diverged—i.e. about how long ago their last common ancestor must have lived—by assuming that DNA mutations accumulate at a constant rate. These "molecular clocks", however, are fallible, and provide only a very approximate timing: they are not sufficiently precise and reliable for estimating when the groups that feature in the Cambrian explosion first evolved, and estimates produced by different techniques vary by a factor of two. However, the clocks can give an indication of branching rate, and when combined with the constraints of the fossil record, recent clocks suggest a sustained period of diversification through the Ediacaran and Cambrian.

== Explanation of key scientific terms ==
Stem groups: — = Lines of descent; = Basal node; = Crown node; = Total group; = Crown group; = Stem group

=== Phylum ===
A phylum is the highest level in the Linnaean system for classifying organisms. Phyla can be thought of as groupings of animals based on general body plan. Despite the seemingly different external appearances of organisms, they are classified into phyla based on their internal and developmental organizations. For example, despite their obvious differences, spiders and barnacles both belong to the phylum Arthropoda, but earthworms and tapeworms, although similar in shape, belong to different phyla. As chemical and genetic testing becomes more accurate, previously hypothesised phyla are often entirely reworked.

A phylum is not a fundamental division of nature, such as the difference between electrons and protons. It is simply a very high-level grouping in a classification system created to describe all currently living organisms. This system is imperfect, even for modern animals: different books quote different numbers of phyla, mainly because they disagree about the classification of a huge number of worm-like species. As it is based on living organisms, it accommodates extinct organisms poorly, if at all.

=== Stem group ===
The concept of stem groups was introduced to cover evolutionary "aunts" and "cousins" of living groups, and have been hypothesized based on this scientific theory. A crown group is a group of closely related living animals plus their last common ancestor plus all its descendants. A stem group is a set of offshoots from the lineage at a point earlier than the last common ancestor of the crown group; it is a relative concept, for example tardigrades are living animals that form a crown group in their own right, but Budd (1996) regarded them as also being a stem group relative to the arthropods.

A coelomate animal is basically a set of concentric tubes, with a gap between the gut and the outer tubes.

=== Triploblastic ===
The term Triploblastic means consisting of three layers, which are formed in the embryo, quite early in the animal's development from a single-celled egg to a larva or juvenile form. The innermost layer forms the digestive tract (gut); the outermost forms skin; and the middle one forms muscles and all the internal organs except the digestive system. Most types of living animal are triploblastic—the best-known exceptions are Porifera (sponges) and Cnidaria (jellyfish, sea anemones, etc.).

=== Bilaterian ===
The bilaterians are animals that have right and left sides at some point in their life histories. This implies that they have top and bottom surfaces and, importantly, distinct front and back ends. All known bilaterian animals are triploblastic, and all known triploblastic animals are bilaterian. Living echinoderms (sea stars, sea urchins, sea cucumbers, etc.) 'look' radially symmetrical (like wheels) rather than bilaterian, but their larvae exhibit bilateral symmetry and some of the earliest echinoderms may have been bilaterally symmetrical. Porifera and Cnidaria are radially symmetrical, not bilaterian, and not triploblastic (but the common Bilateria-Cnidaria ancestor's planula larva is suspected to be bilaterally symmetric).

=== Coelomate ===
The term coelomate means having a body cavity (coelom) containing the internal organs. Most of the phyla featured in the debate about the Cambrian explosion are coelomates: arthropods, annelid worms, molluscs, echinoderms and chordates—the noncoelomate priapulids are an important exception. All known coelomate animals are triploblastic bilaterians, but some triploblastic bilaterian animals do not have a coelom—for example flatworms, whose organs are surrounded by unspecialized tissues.

== Precambrian life ==
=== Evidence of animals around one billion years ago ===
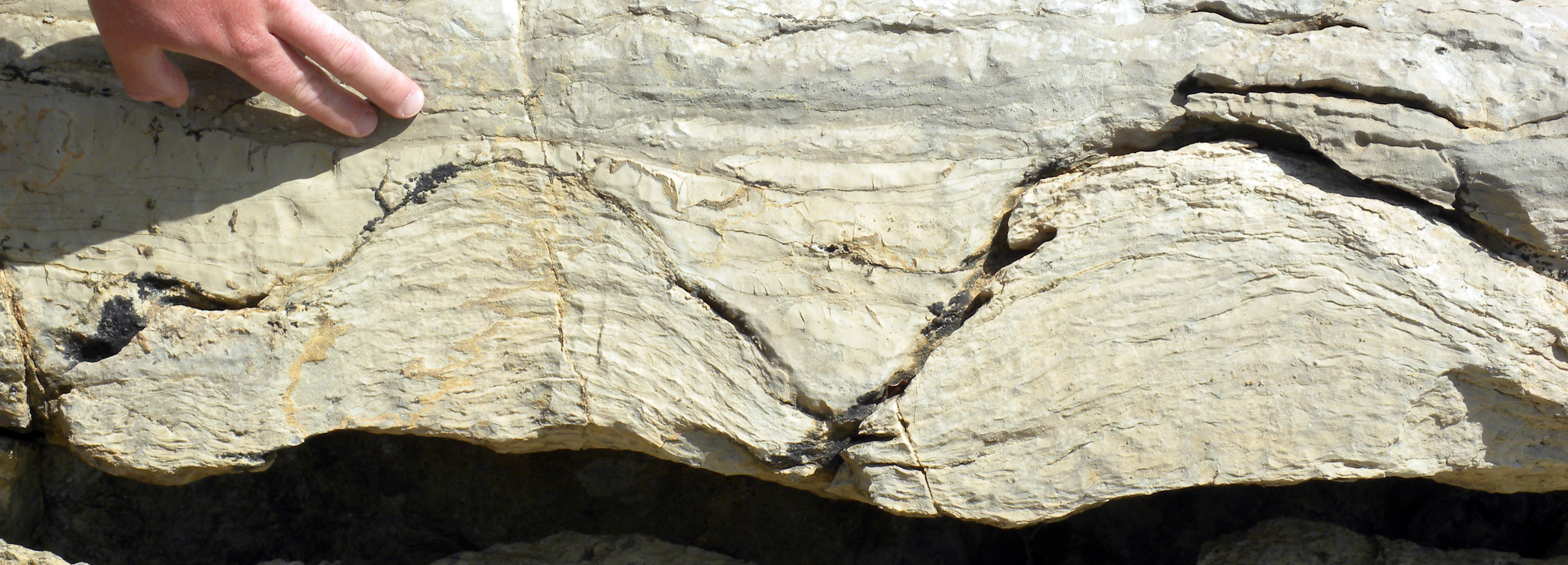
Stromatolites (Pika Formation, Middle Cambrian) near Helen Lake, Banff National Park, Canada

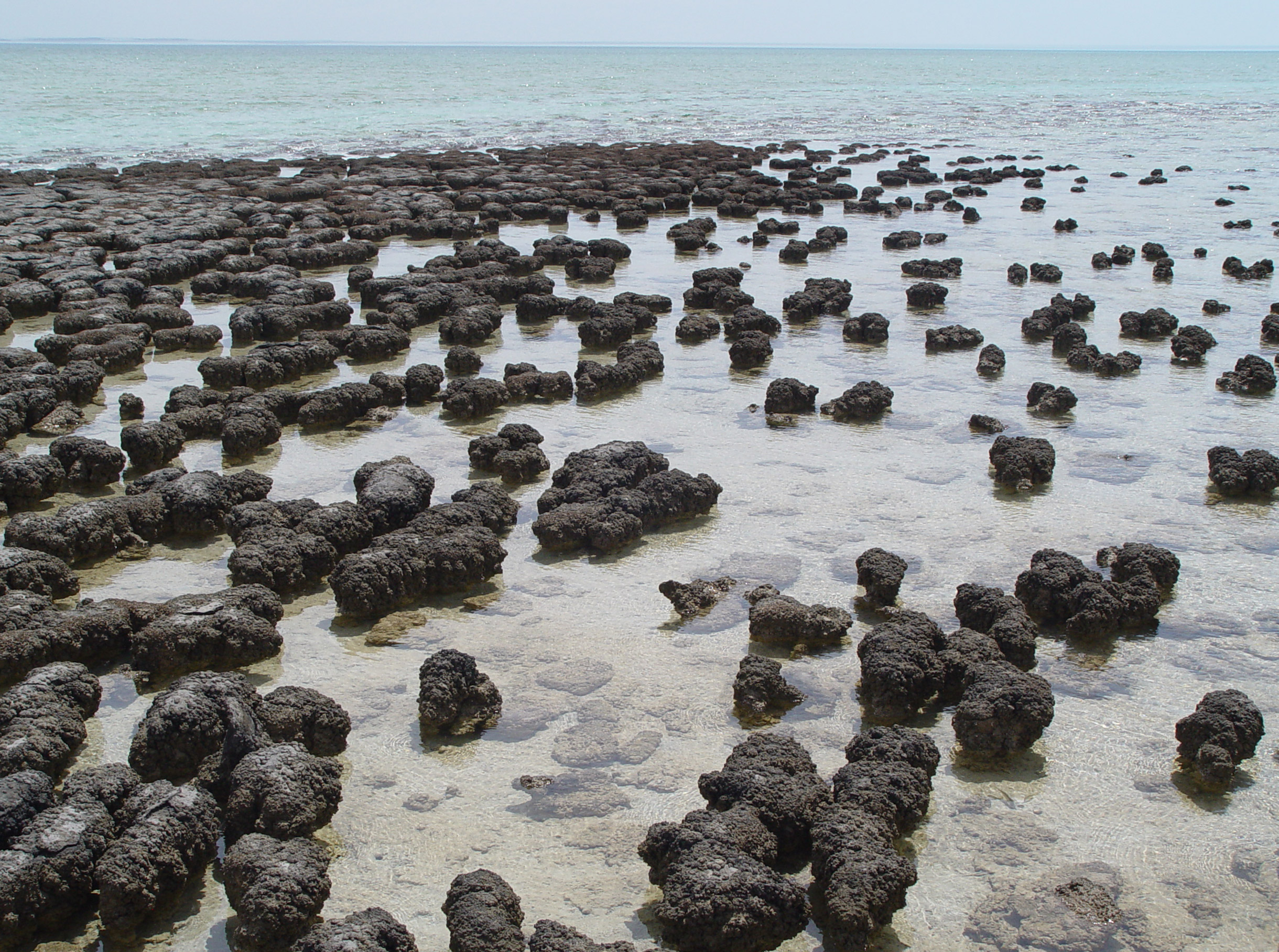
Modern stromatolites in Hamelin Pool Marine Nature Reserve, Western Australia

Changes in the abundance and diversity of some types of fossil have been interpreted as evidence for "attacks" by animals or other organisms. Stromatolites, stubby pillars built by colonies of microorganisms, are a major constituent of the fossil record from about 2,700 million years ago, but their abundance and diversity declined steeply after about 1,250 million years ago. This decline has been attributed to disruption by grazing and burrowing animals.

Precambrian marine diversity was dominated by small fossils known as acritarchs. This term describes almost any small organic-walled fossil—from the egg cases of small metazoans to resting cysts of many different kinds of green algae. After appearing around 2,000 million years ago, acritarchs underwent a boom around 1,000 million years ago, increasing in abundance, diversity, size, complexity of shape, and especially size and number of spines. Their increasingly spiny forms in the last 1 billion years may indicate an increased need for defence against predation. Other groups of small organisms from the Neoproterozoic era also show signs of antipredator defenses. A consideration of taxon longevity appears to support an increase in predation pressure around this time.

In general, the fossil record shows a very slow appearance of these lifeforms in the Precambrian, with many cyanobacterial species making up much of the underlying sediment.

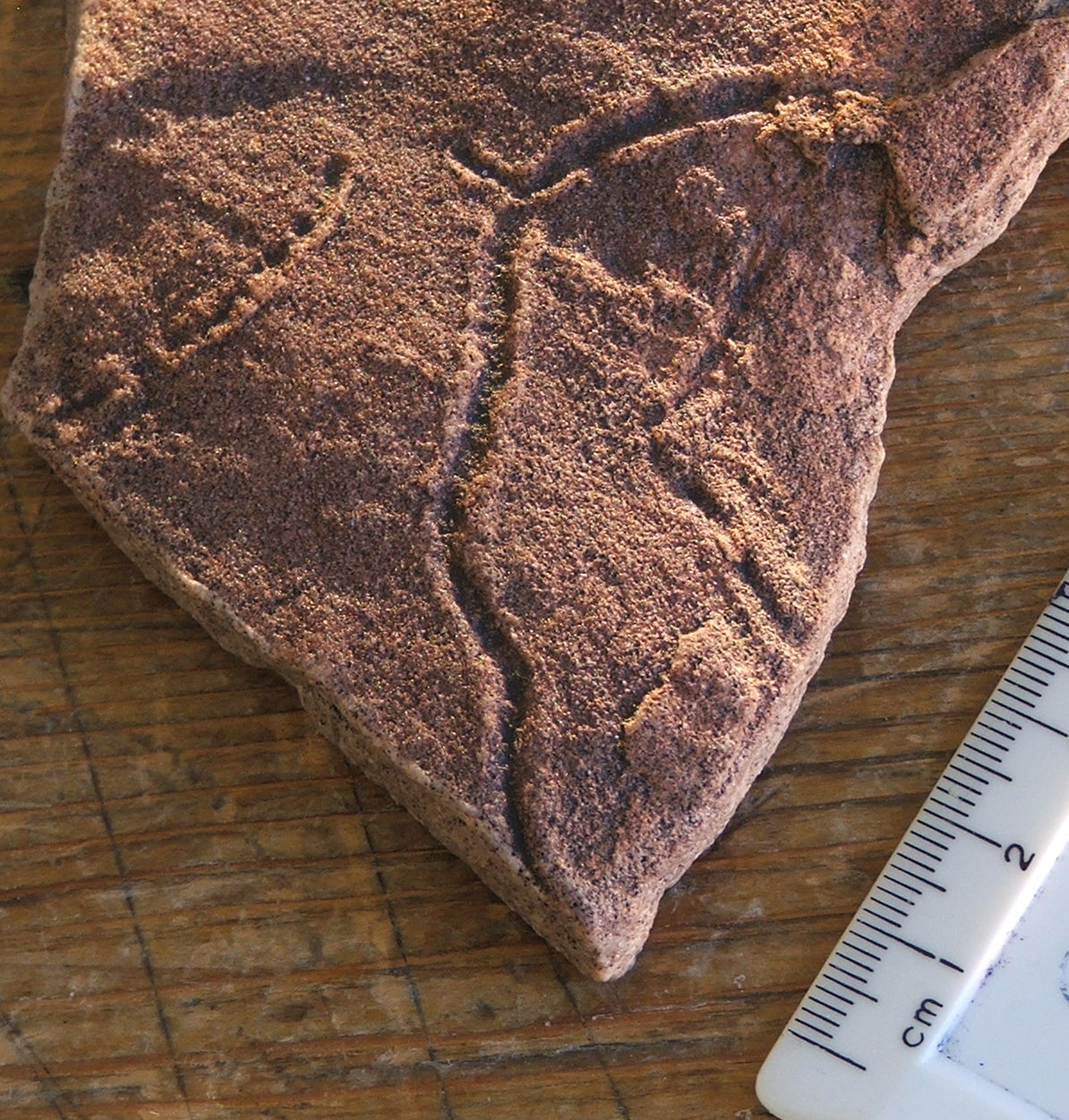
An Ediacaran trace fossil, made when an organism burrowed below a microbial mat

=== Ediacaran organisms ===
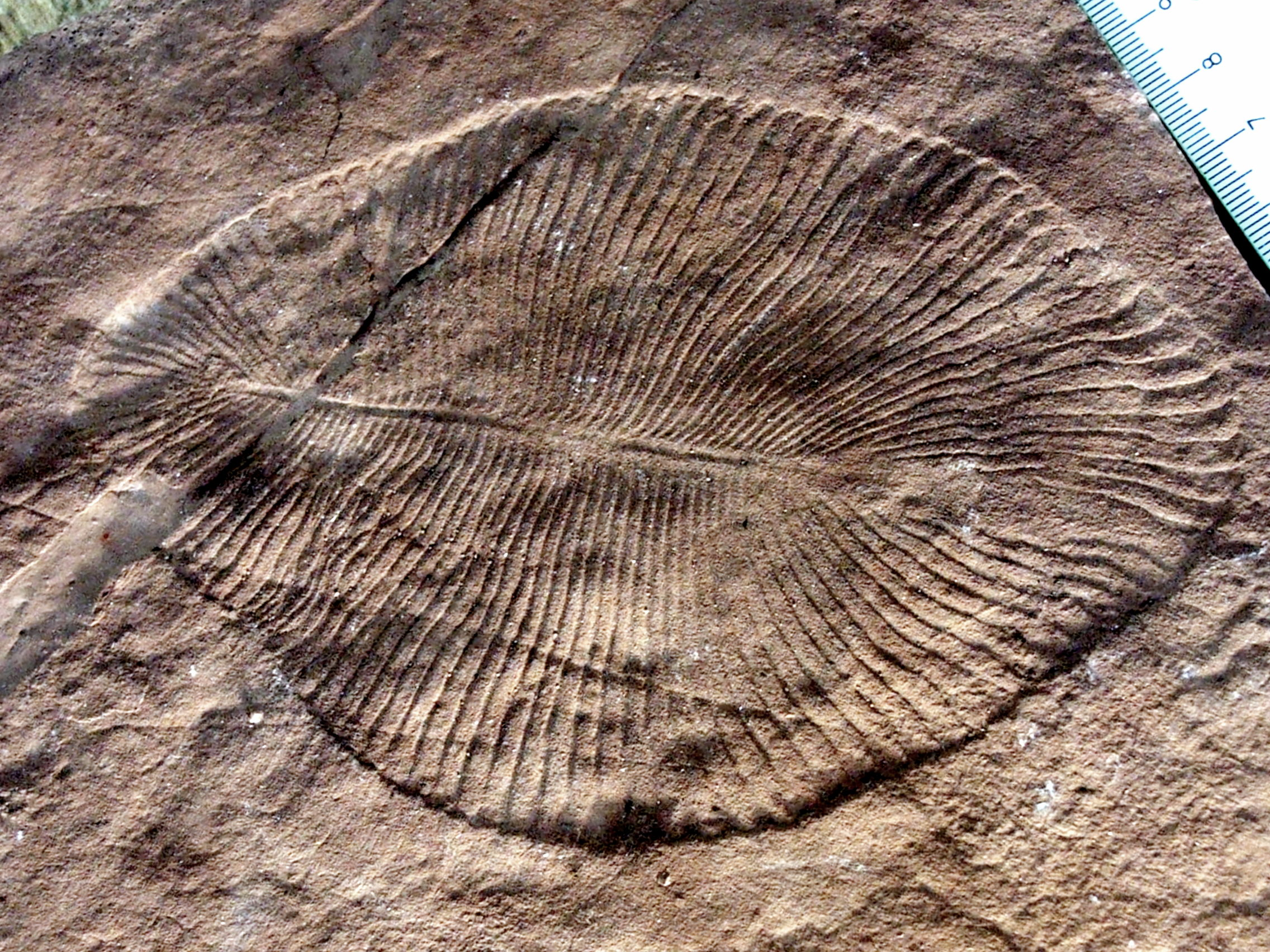
Dickinsonia costata, an Ediacaran organism of unknown affinity, with a quilted appearance

At the start of the Ediacaran period, much of the acritarch fauna, which had remained relatively unchanged for hundreds of millions of years, became extinct, to be replaced with a range of new, larger species, which would prove far more ephemeral. This radiation, the first in the fossil record, is followed soon after by an array of unfamiliar, large fossils dubbed the Ediacara biota, which flourished for 40 million years until the start of the Cambrian. Most of this "Ediacara biota" were at least a few centimeters long, significantly larger than any earlier fossils. The organisms form three distinct assemblages, increasing in size and complexity as time progressed.

Many of these organisms were quite unlike anything that appeared before or since, resembling discs, mud-filled bags, or quilted mattresses—one paleontologist proposed that the strangest organisms should be classified as a separate kingdom, Vendozoa.

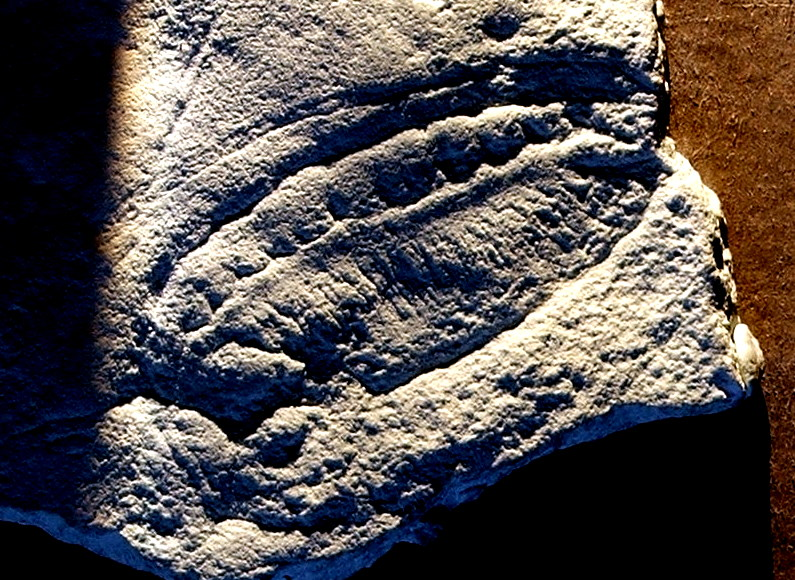
Fossil of Kimberella, a triploblastic bilaterian, and possibly a mollusc

At least some may have been early forms of the phyla in the Cambrian explosion, having been interpreted as early molluscs (Kimberella), echinoderms (Arkarua) and arthropods (Spriggina, Parvancorina, Yilingia). Still, debate exists about the classification of these specimens, mainly because the diagnostic features that allow taxonomists to classify more recent organisms, such as similarities to living organisms, are generally absent in the ediacarans. However, there seems little doubt that Kimberella was at least a triploblastic bilaterian animal. These organisms are central to the debate about how abrupt the Cambrian explosion was. If some were early members of the animal phyla seen today, the "explosion" looks a lot less sudden than if all these organisms represent an unrelated "experiment", and were replaced by the animal kingdom fairly soon thereafter (40 million years is "soon" by evolutionary and geological standards).

The traces of organisms moving on and directly underneath the microbial mats that covered the Ediacaran sea floor are preserved from the Ediacaran period, about 565 million years ago. (Note: Older marks found in billion-year-old rocks have since been recognised as nonbiogenic.) They were probably made by organisms resembling earthworms in shape, size and how they moved. The burrow-makers have never been found preserved, but, because they would need a head and a tail, the burrowers probably had bilateral symmetry—which would in all probability make them bilaterian animals. They fed above the sediment surface, but were forced to burrow to avoid predators.

== Cambrian life ==
=== Trace fossils ===
Trace fossils (burrows, etc.) are a reliable indicator of what life was around, and indicate a diversification of life around the start of the Cambrian, with the freshwater realm colonized by animals almost as quickly as the oceans.

=== Small shelly fauna ===
Fossils known as "small shelly fauna" have been found in many parts on the world, and date from just before the Cambrian to about 10 million years after the start of the Cambrian (the Nemakit-Daldynian and Tommotian ages; see timeline). These are a very mixed collection of fossils: spines, sclerites (armor plates), tubes, archeocyathids (sponge-like animals) and small shells very like those of brachiopods and snail-like molluscs—but all tiny, mostly 1 to 2 mm long.

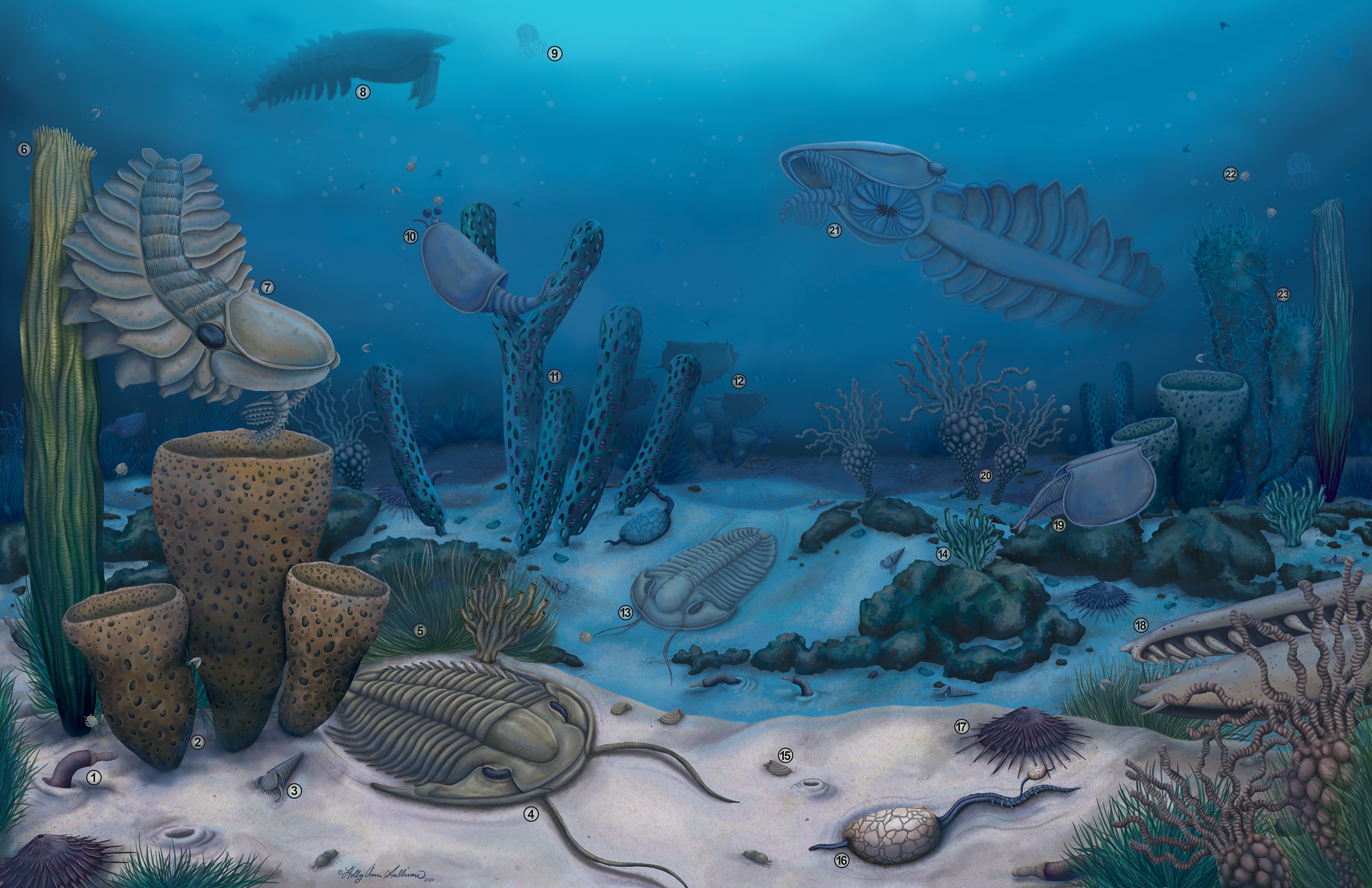
Artistic reconstruction of Cambrian life

While small, these fossils are far more common than complete fossils of the organisms that produced them; crucially, they cover the window from the start of the Cambrian to the first lagerstätten: a period of time otherwise lacking in fossils. Hence, they supplement the conventional fossil record and allow the fossil ranges of many groups to be extended.

=== Cnidarians ===
The first cnidarian larvae, represented by the genus Eolarva, appeared in the Cambrian, although the identity of Eolarva as such is controversial. If it does represent a cnidarian larva, Eolarva would represent the first fossil evidence of indirect development in metazoans in the earliest Cambrian.

Medusozoans developed complex life cycles with a medusa stage during the Cambrian explosion, as evidenced by the discovery of Burgessomedusa phasmiformis.

=== Trilobites ===
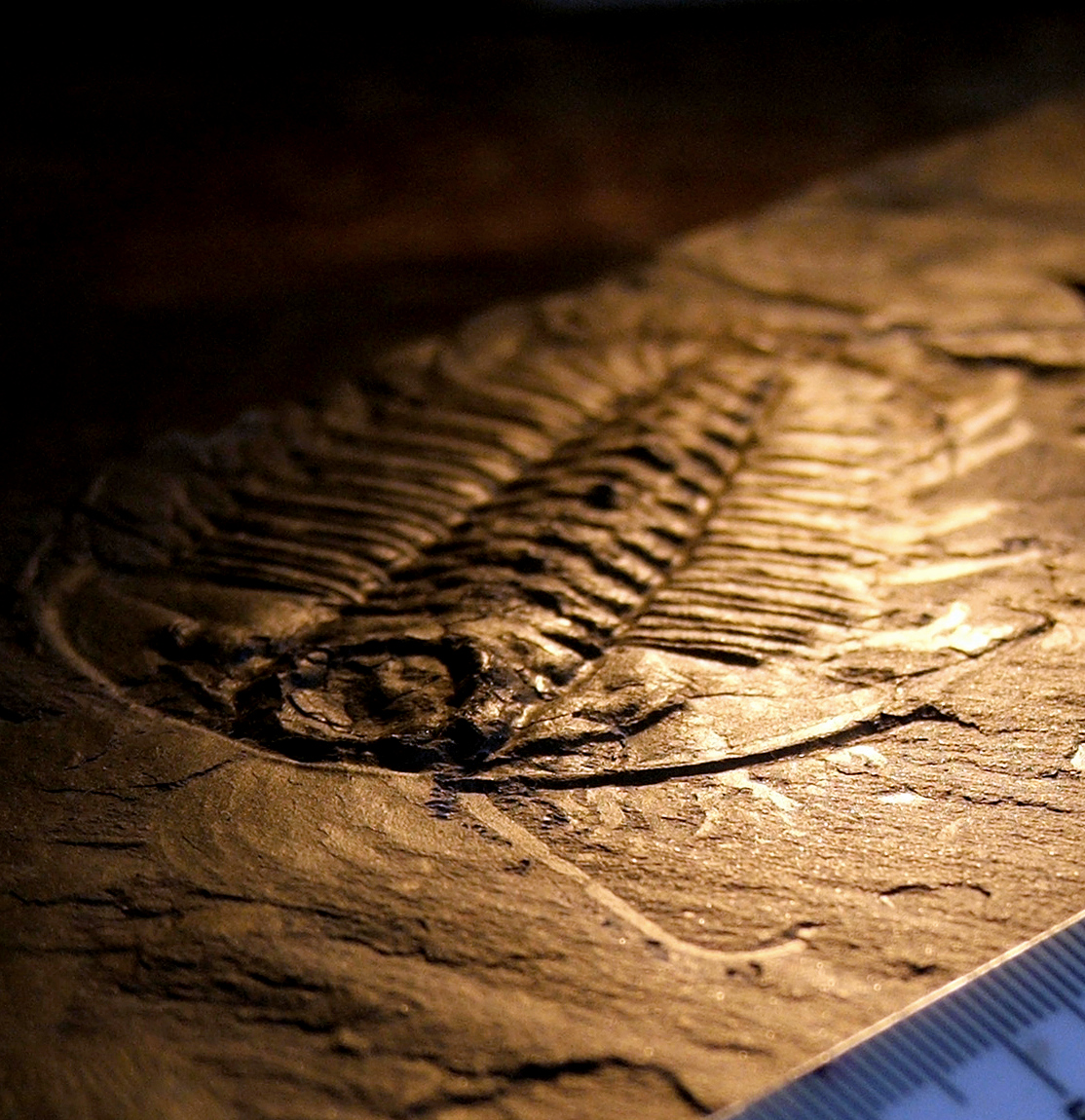
A fossilized trilobite, an ancient type of arthropod: This specimen, from the Burgess Shale, preserves "soft parts"—the antennae and legs.

The earliest trilobite fossils are about 530 million years old, but the class was already quite diverse and cosmopolitan, suggesting they had been around for quite some time. The fossil record of trilobites began with the appearance of trilobites with mineral exoskeletons—not from the time of their origin.

=== Crustaceans ===
Crustaceans, one of the four great modern groups of arthropods, are very rare throughout the Cambrian. Convincing crustaceans were once thought to be common in Burgess Shale-type biotas, but none of these individuals can be shown to fall into the crown group of "true crustaceans". The Cambrian record of crown-group crustaceans comes from microfossils. The Swedish Orsten horizons contain later Cambrian crustaceans, but only organisms smaller than 2 mm are preserved. This restricts the data set to juveniles and miniaturised adults.

A more informative data source is the organic microfossils of the Mount Cap formation, Mackenzie Mountains, Canada. This late Early Cambrian assemblage (510 to 515 million years ago) consists of microscopic fragments of arthropods' cuticle, which is left behind when the rock is dissolved with hydrofluoric acid. The diversity of this assemblage is similar to that of modern crustacean faunas. Analysis of fragments of feeding machinery found in the formation shows that it was adapted to feed in a very precise and refined fashion. This contrasts with most other early Cambrian arthropods, which fed messily by shovelling anything they could get their feeding appendages on into their mouths. This sophisticated and specialised feeding machinery belonged to a large (about 30 cm) organism, and would have provided great potential for diversification: Specialised feeding apparatus allows a number of different approaches to feeding and development, and creates a number of different approaches to avoid being eaten.

=== Echinoderms ===
The earliest generally accepted echinoderm fossils appeared in the Late Atdabanian; unlike modern echinoderms, these early Cambrian echinoderms were not all radially symmetrical. These provide firm data points for the "end" of the explosion, or at least indications that the crown groups of modern phyla were represented.

=== Burrowing ===
Around the start of the Cambrian (about 539 million years ago), many new types of traces first appear, including well-known vertical burrows such as Diplocraterion and Skolithos, and traces normally attributed to arthropods, such as Cruziana and Rusophycus. The vertical burrows indicate that worm-like animals acquired new behaviours, and possibly new physical capabilities. Some Cambrian trace fossils indicate that their makers possessed hard exoskeletons, although they were not necessarily mineralised. Meiofaunal as well as macrofaunal bilaterians participated in this invasion of infaunal niches.

Burrows provide firm evidence of complex organisms; they are also much more readily preserved than body fossils, to the extent that the absence of trace fossils has been used to imply the genuine absence of large, motile, bottom-dwelling organisms. They provide a further line of evidence to show that the Cambrian explosion represents a real diversification, and is not a preservational artefact.

=== Skeletonisation ===
The first Ediacaran and lowest Cambrian (Nemakit-Daldynian) skeletal fossils represent tubes and problematic sponge spicules. The oldest sponge spicules are monaxon siliceous, aged around 580 million years ago, known from the Doushantuo Formation in China and from deposits of the same age in Mongolia, although the interpretation of these fossils as spicules has been challenged. In the late Ediacaran-lowest Cambrian, numerous tube dwellings of enigmatic organisms appeared. It was organic-walled tubes (e.g. Saarina) and chitinous tubes of the sabelliditids (e.g. Sokoloviina, Sabellidites, Paleolina) that prospered up to the beginning of the Tommotian. The mineralized tubes of Cloudina, Namacalathus, Sinotubulites and a dozen more of the other organisms from carbonate rocks formed near the end of the Ediacaran period from 549 to 542 million years ago, as well as the triradially symmetrical mineralized tubes of anabaritids (e.g. Anabarites, Cambrotubulus) from uppermost Ediacaran and lower Cambrian. Ediacaran mineralized tubes are often found in carbonates of the stromatolite reefs and thrombolites, i.e. they could live in an environment adverse to the majority of animals.

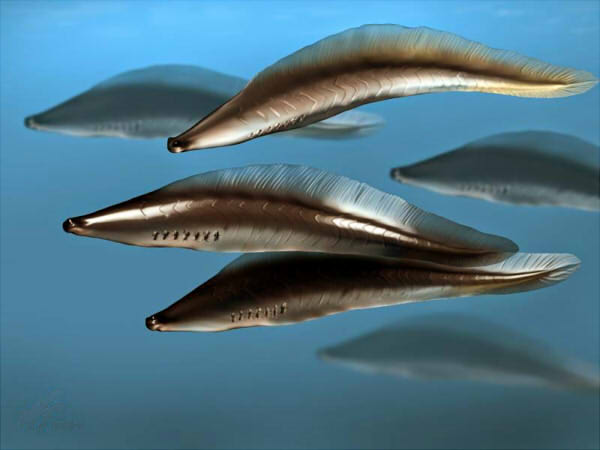
Haikouichthys is considered one of the earliest known fish, or fish-like vertebrates

Although they are as hard to classify as most other Ediacaran organisms, they are important in two other ways. First, they are the earliest known calcifying organisms (organisms that built shells from calcium carbonate). Secondly, these tubes are a device to rise over a substrate and competitors for effective feeding and, to a lesser degree, they serve as armor for protection against predators and adverse conditions of environment. Some Cloudina fossils show small holes in shells. The holes possibly are evidence of boring by predators sufficiently advanced to penetrate shells. A possible "evolutionary arms race" between predators and prey is one of the hypotheses that attempt to explain the Cambrian explosion.

In the lowest Cambrian, the stromatolites were decimated. This allowed animals to begin colonization of warm-water pools with carbonate sedimentation. At first, it was anabaritids and Protohertzina (the fossilized grasping spines of chaetognaths) fossils. Such mineral skeletons as shells, sclerites, thorns and plates appeared in uppermost Nemakit-Daldynian; they were the earliest species of halkierids, gastropods, hyoliths and other rare organisms. The beginning of the Tommotian has historically been understood to mark an explosive increase of the number and variety of fossils of molluscs, hyoliths and sponges, along with a rich complex of skeletal elements of unknown animals, the first archaeocyathids, brachiopods, tommotiids and others. Also soft-bodied extant phyla such as comb jellies, scalidophorans, entoproctans, horseshoe worms and lobopodians had armored forms. This sudden increase is partially an artefact of missing strata at the Tommotian-type section, and most of this fauna in fact began to diversify in a series of pulses through the Nemakit-Daldynian and into the Tommotian.

Some animals may already have had sclerites, thorns, and plates in the Ediacaran (e.g. Kimberella had hard sclerites, probably of carbonate), but thin carbonate skeletons cannot be fossilized in siliciclastic deposits. Older (~750 Ma) fossils indicate that mineralization long preceded the Cambrian, probably defending small photosynthetic algae from single-celled eukaryotic predators.

=== Burgess Shale type faunas ===
The Burgess Shale and similar lagerstätten preserve the soft parts of organisms, which provide a wealth of data to aid in the classification of enigmatic fossils. It often preserved complete specimens of organisms only otherwise known from dispersed parts, such as loose scales or isolated mouthparts. Further, the majority of organisms and taxa in these horizons are entirely soft-bodied, hence absent from the rest of the fossil record. Since a large part of the ecosystem is preserved, the ecology of the community can also be tentatively reconstructed. However, the assemblages may represent a "museum": a deep-water ecosystem that is evolutionarily "behind" the rapidly diversifying fauna of shallower waters.

Because the lagerstätten provide a mode and quality of preservation that is virtually absent outside of the Cambrian, many organisms appear completely different from anything known from the conventional fossil record. This led early workers in the field to attempt to shoehorn the organisms into extant phyla; the shortcomings of this approach led later workers to erect a multitude of new phyla to accommodate all the oddballs. It has since been realised that most oddballs diverged from lineages before they established the phyla known today—slightly different designs, which were fated to perish rather than flourish into phyla, as their cousin lineages did.

The preservational mode is rare in the preceding Ediacaran period, but those assemblages known show no trace of animal life—perhaps implying a genuine absence of macroscopic metazoans.

== Stages ==
The early Cambrian interval of diversification lasted for about the next 20–25 million years, and its elevated rates of evolution had ended by the base of Cambrian Series 2, 521 million years ago, coincident with the first trilobites in the fossil record. Different authors define intervals of diversification during the early Cambrian different ways:

Ed Landing recognizes three stages: Stage 1, spanning the Ediacaran-Cambrian boundary, corresponds to a diversification of biomineralizing animals and of deep and complex burrows; Stage 2, corresponding to the radiation of molluscs and stem-group Brachiopods (hyoliths and tommotiids), which apparently arose in intertidal waters; and Stage 3, seeing the Atdabanian diversification of trilobites in deeper waters, but little change in the intertidal realm.

Graham Budd synthesises various schemes to produce a compatible view of the SSF record of the Cambrian explosion, divided slightly differently into four intervals: a "Tube world", lasting from 550 to 536 million years ago, spanning the Ediacaran-Cambrian boundary, dominated by Cloudina, Namacalathus and pseudoconodont-type elements; a "Sclerite world", seeing the rise of halkieriids, tommotiids and hyoliths, lasting to the end of the Fortunian (c. 525 Ma); a brachiopod world, perhaps corresponding to the as yet unratified Cambrian Stage 2; and Trilobite World, kicking off in Stage 3.

Complementary to the shelly fossil record, trace fossils can be divided into five subdivisions: "Flat world" (late Ediacaran), with traces restricted to the sediment surface; Protreozoic III (after Jensen), with increasing complexity; pedum world, initiated at the base of the Cambrian with the base of the T.pedum zone (see Cambrian#Dating the Cambrian); Rusophycus world, spanning 536 to 521 million years ago and thus corresponding exactly to the periods of Sclerite World and Brachiopod World under the SSF paradigm; and Cruziana world, with an obvious correspondence to Trilobite World.

== Validity ==
There is strong evidence for species of Cnidaria and Porifera existing in the Ediacaran and possible members of Porifera even before that during the Cryogenian. Bryozoans, once thought to not appear in the fossil record until after the Cambrian, are now known from strata of Cambrian Age 3 from Australia and South China.

The fossil record as Darwin knew it seemed to suggest that the major metazoan groups appeared in a few million years of the early to mid-Cambrian, and even in the 1980s, this still appeared to be the case.

However, evidence of Precambrian Metazoa is gradually accumulating. If the Ediacaran Kimberella was a mollusc-like protostome (one of the two main groups of coelomates), the protostome and deuterostome lineages must have split significantly before 550 million years ago (deuterostomes are the other main group of coelomates). Even if it is not a protostome, it is widely accepted as a bilaterian. Since fossils of rather modern-looking cnidarians (jellyfish-like organisms) have been found in the Doushantuo lagerstätte, the cnidarian and bilaterian lineages must have diverged well over 580 million years ago.

Trace fossils and predatory borings in Cloudina shells provide further evidence of Ediacaran animals. Some fossils from the Doushantuo formation have been interpreted as embryos and one (Vernanimalcula) as a bilaterian coelomate, although these interpretations are not universally accepted. Earlier still, predatory pressure has acted on stromatolites and acritarchs since around 1,250 million years ago.

Some say that the evolutionary change was accelerated by an order of magnitude, (Note: As defined in terms of the extinction and origination rate of species.) but the presence of Precambrian animals somewhat dampens the "bang" of the explosion; not only was the appearance of animals gradual, but their evolutionary radiation ("diversification") may also not have been as rapid as once thought. Indeed, statistical analysis shows that the Cambrian explosion was no faster than any of the other radiations in animals' history. (Note: The analysis considered the bioprovinciality of trilobite lineages, as well as their evolutionary rate.) However, it does seem that some innovations linked to the explosion—such as resistant armour—only evolved once in the animal lineage; this makes a lengthy Precambrian animal lineage harder to defend. Further, the conventional view that all the phyla arose in the Cambrian is flawed; while the phyla may have diversified in this time period, representatives of the crown groups of many phyla do not appear until much later in the Phanerozoic. Further, the mineralised phyla that form the basis of the fossil record may not be representative of other phyla, since most mineralised phyla originated in a benthic setting. The fossil record is consistent with a Cambrian explosion that was limited to the benthos, with pelagic phyla evolving much later.

Ecological complexity among marine animals increased in the Cambrian, as well later in the Ordovician. However, recent research has overthrown the once-popular idea that disparity was exceptionally high throughout the Cambrian, before subsequently decreasing. In fact, disparity remains relatively low throughout the Cambrian, with modern levels of disparity only attained after the early Ordovician radiation.

The diversity of many Cambrian assemblages is similar to today's, and at a high (class/phylum) level, diversity is thought by some to have risen relatively smoothly through the Cambrian, stabilizing somewhat in the Ordovician. This interpretation, however, glosses over the astonishing and fundamental pattern of basal polytomy and phylogenetic telescoping at or near the Cambrian boundary, as seen in most major animal lineages. Thus Harry Blackmore Whittington's questions regarding the abrupt nature of the Cambrian explosion remain, and have yet to be satisfactorily answered.

=== The Cambrian explosion as survivorship bias ===
Budd and Mann suggested that the Cambrian explosion was the result of a type of survivorship bias called the "Push of the past". As groups at their origin tend to go extinct, it follows that any long-lived group would have experienced an unusually rapid rate of diversification early on, creating the illusion of a general speed-up in diversification rates. However, rates of diversification could remain at background levels and still generate this sort of effect in the surviving lineages.

== Possible causes ==
Despite the evidence that moderately complex animals (triploblastic bilaterians) existed before and possibly long before the start of the Cambrian, it seems that the pace of evolution was exceptionally fast in the early Cambrian. Possible explanations for this fall into three broad categories: environmental, developmental and ecological changes. Any explanation must explain both the timing and the magnitude of the explosion.

=== Changes in the environment ===
==== Increase in oxygen levels ====
Earth's earliest atmosphere contained no free oxygen (O_{2}); the oxygen that animals breathe today, both in the air and dissolved in water, is the product of billions of years of photosynthesis. Cyanobacteria were the first organisms to evolve the ability to photosynthesize, introducing a steady supply of oxygen into the environment. Initially, oxygen levels did not increase substantially in the atmosphere. The oxygen quickly reacted with iron and other minerals in the surrounding rock and ocean water. Once a saturation point was reached for the reactions in rock and water, oxygen was able to exist as a gas in its diatomic form. Oxygen levels in the atmosphere increased substantially afterward. As a general trend, the concentration of oxygen in the atmosphere has risen gradually over about the last 2.5 billion years.

Oxygen levels seem to have a positive correlation with diversity in eukaryotes well before the Cambrian period. The last common ancestor of all extant eukaryotes is thought to have lived around 1.8 billion years ago. Around 800 million years ago, there was a notable increase in the complexity and number of eukaryotes species in the fossil record. Before the spike in diversity, eukaryotes are thought to have lived in highly sulfuric environments. Sulfide interferes with mitochondrial function in aerobic organisms, limiting the amount of oxygen that could be used to drive metabolism. Oceanic sulfide levels decreased around 800 million years ago, which supports the importance of oxygen in eukaryotic diversity. The increased ventilation of the oceans by sponges, which had already evolved and diversified during the late Neoproterozoic, has been proposed to have increased the availability of oxygen and powered the Cambrian's rapid diversification of multicellular life. Molybdenum isotopes show that increases in biodiversity were strongly correlated with expansion of oxygenated bottom waters in the Early Cambrian, lending support for oxygen as a driver of the Cambrian evolutionary radiation.

The shortage of oxygen might well have prevented the rise of large, complex animals. The amount of oxygen an animal can absorb is largely determined by the area of its oxygen-absorbing surfaces (lungs and gills in the most complex animals; the skin in less complex ones), while the amount needed is determined by its volume, which grows faster than the oxygen-absorbing area if an animal's size increases equally in all directions. An increase in the concentration of oxygen in air or water would increase the size to which an organism could grow without its tissues becoming starved of oxygen. However, members of the Ediacara biota reached metres in length tens of millions of years before the Cambrian explosion. Other metabolic functions may have been inhibited by lack of oxygen, for example the construction of tissue such as collagen, which is required for the construction of complex structures, or the biosynthesis of molecules for the construction of a hard exoskeleton. However, animals were not affected when similar oceanographic conditions occurred in the Phanerozoic; therefore, some see no forcing role of the oxygen level on evolution.

==== Ozone formation ====
The amount of ozone (O_{3}) required to shield Earth from biologically lethal UV radiation, wavelengths from 200 to 300 nanometers (nm), is believed to have been in existence around the Cambrian explosion. The presence of the ozone layer may have enabled the development of complex life and life on land, as opposed to life being restricted to the water.

==== Snowball Earth ====
In the late Neoproterozoic (extending into the early Ediacaran period), the Earth suffered massive glaciations in which most of its surface was covered by ice. This may have caused a mass extinction, creating a genetic bottleneck; the resulting diversification may have given rise to the Ediacara biota, which appears soon after the last "Snowball Earth" episode. However, the snowball episodes occurred a long time before the start of the Cambrian, and it is difficult to see how so much diversity could have been caused by even a series of bottlenecks; the cold periods may even have delayed the evolution of large size organisms. Massive rock erosion caused by glaciers during the "Snowball Earth" may have deposited nutrient-rich sediments into the oceans, setting the stage for the Cambrian explosion.

==== Increase in the mineral content of the Cambrian seawater ====
Newer research suggests that volcanically active mid-ocean ridges caused a massive and sudden surge of the calcium concentration in the oceans, making it possible for marine organisms to build skeletons and hard body parts. Alternatively a high influx of ions could have been provided by the widespread erosion that produced Powell's Great Unconformity.

An increase of calcium may also have been caused by erosion of the Transgondwanan Supermountain that existed at the time of the explosion. The roots of the mountain are preserved in present-day East Africa as an orogen.

In tandem, the levels of phosphorus in the Ediacaran oceans were substantially below those in later seas; this may have delayed the origin of phosphatic-shelled organisms.

==== Origin and increase of fecal matter ====
New research done in 2026 analysing the coprolite record, digestive tract evolution, and its potential effects on the biologic pump through the Ediacaran and Cambrian found that it is likely that a constant increase of available fecal matter in aggregate form starting in the Cambrian provided important nutrients to animal life and also increased the nutrients in deeper waters. This suggests that fecal matter might have played an important role for the Cambrian Radiation.

==== Increase in ocean alkalinity ====
New research done in 2014 using boron isotope analysis found that ocean alkalinity was rising until the Early Cambrian. This would have had the effect of making it easier for organisms to precipitate calcium carbonate, facilitating easier formation of hard parts, including shells, exoskeletons, and spines.

=== Developmental explanations ===
A range of theories are based on the concept that minor modifications to animals' development as they grow from embryo to adult may have been able to cause very large changes in the final adult form. The Hox genes, for example, control which organs individual regions of an embryo will develop into. For instance, if a certain Hox gene is expressed, a region will develop into a limb; if a different Hox gene is expressed in that region (a minor change), it could develop into an eye instead (a phenotypically major change).

Such a system allows a large range of disparity to appear from a limited set of genes, but such theories linking this with the explosion struggle to explain why the origin of such a development system should by itself lead to increased diversity or disparity. Evidence of Precambrian metazoans combines with molecular data to show that much of the genetic architecture that could feasibly have played a role in the explosion was already well established by the Cambrian.

This apparent paradox is addressed in a theory that focuses on the physics of development. It is proposed that the emergence of simple multicellular forms provided a changed context and spatial scale in which novel physical processes and effects were mobilized by the products of genes that had previously evolved to serve unicellular functions. Morphological complexity (layers, segments, lumens, appendages) arose, in this view, by self-organization.

Horizontal gene transfer has also been identified as a possible factor in the rapid acquisition of the biochemical capability of biomineralization among organisms during this period, based on evidence that the gene for a critical protein in the process was originally transferred from a bacterium into sponges.

=== Ecological explanations ===
These focus on the interactions between different types of organism. Some of these hypotheses deal with changes in the food chain; some suggest arms races between predators and prey, and others focus on the more general mechanisms of coevolution. Such theories are well suited to explaining why there was a rapid increase in both disparity and diversity, but they do not explain why the explosion happened when it did.

==== End-Ediacaran mass extinction ====
Evidence for such an extinction includes the disappearance from the fossil record of the Ediacara biota and shelly fossils such as Cloudina, and the accompanying perturbation in the δ^{13}C record. It is suspected that several global anoxic events were responsible for the extinction.

Mass extinctions are often followed by adaptive radiations as existing clades expand to occupy the ecospace emptied by the extinction. However, once the dust had settled, overall disparity and diversity returned to the pre-extinction level in each of the Phanerozoic extinctions.

==== Anoxia ====
The late Ediacaran oceans appears to have suffered from an anoxia that covered much of the seafloor, which would have given mobile animals with the ability to seek out more oxygen-rich environments an advantage over sessile forms of life.

==== Increase in sensory and cognitive abilities ====
Andrew Parker has proposed that predator-prey relationships changed dramatically after eyesight evolved. Prior to that time, hunting and evading were both close-range affairs—smell (chemoreception), vibration and touch were the only senses used. When predators could see their prey from a distance, new defensive strategies were needed. Armor, spines and similar defenses may also have evolved in response to vision. He further observed that, where animals lose vision in unlighted environments such as caves, diversity of animal forms tends to decrease. Nevertheless, many scientists doubt that vision could have caused the explosion. Eyes may well have evolved long before the start of the Cambrian. It is also difficult to understand why the evolution of eyesight would have caused an explosion, since other senses, such as smell and pressure detection, can detect things at a greater distance in the sea than sight can, but the appearance of these other senses apparently did not cause an evolutionary explosion.

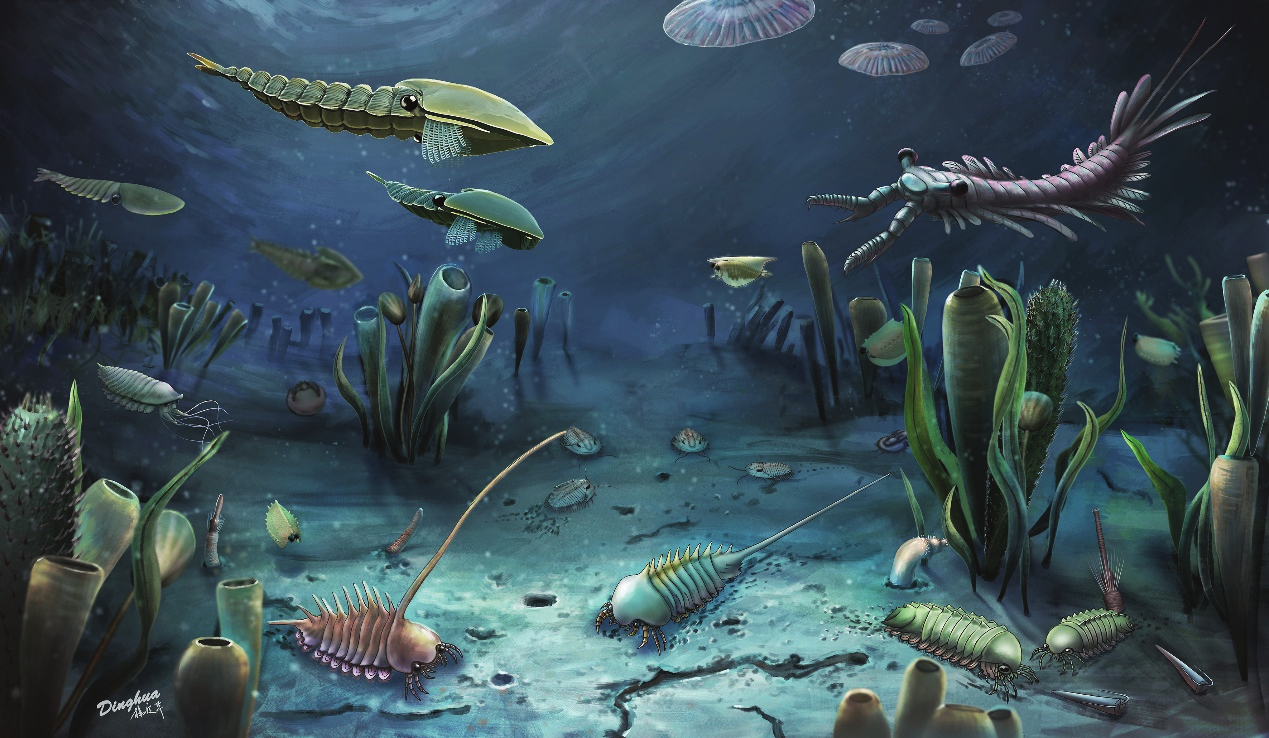
Life on the platform margin of the Miaolingian sea

One hypothesis posits that the development of increased cognitive abilities during the Cambrian drove diversity increase. This is evidenced by the fact that the novel ecological lifestyles created during the Cambrian required rapid, regular movement, a feature associated with brain-bearing organisms. The increasing complexity of brains, positively correlated with a greater range of motion and sensory abilities, enabled a wider range of novel ecological modes of life to come into being.

==== Arms races between predators and prey ====
The ability to avoid or recover from predation often makes the difference between life and death, and is therefore one of the strongest components of natural selection. The pressure to adapt is stronger on the prey than on the predator because if the predator fails to win a contest, it loses a meal, but if the prey is the loser, it loses its life.

But there is evidence that predation was rife long before the start of the Cambrian, for example in the increasingly spiny forms of acritarchs, the holes drilled in Cloudina shells, and traces of burrowing to avoid predators. Hence, it is unlikely that the appearance of predation was the trigger for the Cambrian "explosion", although it may well have exhibited a strong influence on the body forms that the "explosion" produced. However, the intensity of predation does appear to have increased dramatically during the Cambrian as new predatory "tactics" (such as shell-crushing) emerged. This rise of predation during the Cambrian was confirmed by the temporal pattern of the median predator ratio at the scale of genus, in fossil communities covering the Cambrian and Ordovician periods, but this pattern is not correlated to diversification rate. This lack of correlation between predator ratio and diversification over the Cambrian and Ordovician suggests that predators did not trigger the large evolutionary radiation of animals during this interval. Thus the role of predators as triggerers of diversification may have been limited to the very beginning of the "Cambrian explosion".

==== Increase in size and diversity of planktonic animals ====
Geochemical evidence strongly indicates that the total mass of plankton has been similar to modern levels since early in the Proterozoic. Before the start of the Cambrian, their corpses and droppings were too small to fall quickly towards the seabed, since their drag was about the same as their weight. This meant they were destroyed by scavengers or by chemical processes before they reached the sea floor.

Mesozooplankton are plankton of a larger size. Early Cambrian specimens filtered microscopic plankton from the seawater. These larger organisms would have produced droppings and ultimately corpses large enough to fall fairly quickly. This provided a new supply of energy and nutrients to the mid-levels and bottoms of the seas, which opened up a new range of possible ways of life. If any of these remains sank uneaten to the sea floor they could be buried; this would have taken some carbon out of circulation, resulting in an increase in the concentration of breathable oxygen in the seas (carbon readily combines with oxygen).

The initial herbivorous mesozooplankton were probably larvae of benthic (seafloor) animals. A larval stage was probably an evolutionary innovation driven by the increasing level of predation at the seafloor during the Ediacaran period.

Metazoans have an amazing ability to increase diversity through coevolution. This means that an organism's traits can lead to traits evolving in other organisms; a number of responses are possible, and a different species can potentially emerge from each one. As a simple example, the evolution of predation may have caused one organism to develop a defence, while another developed motion to flee. This would cause the predator lineage to diverge into two species: one that was good at chasing prey, and another that was good at breaking through defences. Actual coevolution is somewhat more subtle, but, in this fashion, great diversity can arise: three quarters of living species are animals, and most of the rest have formed by coevolution with animals.

=== Ecosystem engineering ===
Evolving organisms inevitably change the environment they evolve in. The Devonian colonization of land had planet-wide consequences for sediment cycling and ocean nutrients, and was likely linked to the Devonian mass extinction. A similar process may have occurred on smaller scales in the oceans, with, for example, the sponges filtering particles from the water and depositing them in the mud in a more digestible form; or burrowing organisms making previously unavailable resources available for other organisms.

==== Burrowing ====
Increases in burrowing changed the seafloor's geochemistry, and led to decreased oxygen in the ocean and increased CO_{2} levels in the seas and the atmosphere, resulting in global warming for tens of millions of years, and could be responsible for mass extinctions. But as burrowing became established, it allowed an explosion of its own, for as burrowers disturbed the sea floor, they aerated it, mixing oxygen into the toxic muds. This made the bottom sediments more hospitable, and allowed a wider range of organisms to inhabit them—creating new niches and the scope for higher diversity.

=== Complexity threshold ===
The explosion may not have been a significant evolutionary event. It may represent a threshold being crossed: for example a threshold in genetic complexity that allowed a vast range of morphological forms to be employed. This genetic threshold may have a correlation to the amount of oxygen available to organisms. Using oxygen for metabolism produces much more energy than anaerobic processes. Organisms that use more oxygen have the opportunity to produce more complex proteins, providing a template for further evolution. These proteins translate into larger, more complex structures that allow organisms better to adapt to their environments. With the help of oxygen, genes that code for these proteins could contribute to the expression of complex traits more efficiently. Access to a wider range of structures and functions would allow organisms to evolve in different directions, increasing the number of niches that could be inhabited. Furthermore, organisms had the opportunity to become more specialized in their own niches.

== Relationship with the Great Ordovician Biodiversification Event ==
After an extinction at the Cambrian–Ordovician boundary, another radiation occurred, which established the taxa that would dominate the Palaeozoic. This event, known as the Great Ordovician Biodiversification Event (GOBE), has been considered a "follow-up" to the Cambrian explosion. Recent studies have suggested that the Cambrian explosion were not two discrete events but one long evolutionary radiation. Analytical study of the Geobiodiversity Database (GBDB) and Paleobiology Database (PBDB) failed to find a statistical basis for separating the two radiations.

Some researchers have proposed the existence of a biodiversity gap during the Furongian separating the Cambrian explosion and GOBE known as the Furongian Gap. Studies of the Guole Konservat-Lagerstätte and similar fossil sites in South China have instead found the Furongian to instead be a time of rapid biological turnovers though, making the existence of the Furongian Gap highly controversial.

== Uniqueness of the early Cambrian biodiversification ==
The Cambrian explosion can be viewed as two waves of metazoan expansion into empty niches: first, a coevolutionary rise in diversity as animals explored niches on the Ediacaran sea floor, followed by a second expansion in the early Cambrian as they became established in the water column. The rate of diversification seen in the Cambrian phase of the explosion is unparalleled among marine animals: it affected all metazoan clades of which Cambrian fossils have been found. Later radiations, such as those of fish in the Silurian and Devonian periods, involved fewer taxa, mainly with very similar body plans. Although the recovery from the Permian-Triassic extinction started with about as few animal species as the Cambrian explosion, the recovery produced far fewer significantly new types of animals.

Whatever triggered the early Cambrian diversification opened up an exceptionally wide range of previously unavailable ecological niches. When these became all occupied, limited space remained for such wide-ranging diversifications to occur again, because strong competition existed in all niches and incumbents usually had the advantage over newcomers. When niches are filled, lineages will continue to resemble one another long after they diverge, as limited opportunity exists for them to change their lifestyles and forms.

There were two similar explosions in the evolution of land plants: after a cryptic history beginning about 450 million years ago, land plants underwent a uniquely rapid adaptive radiation during the Devonian period, about 400 million years ago. Furthermore, angiosperms (flowering plants) originated and rapidly diversified during the Cretaceous period.

== See also ==
- Avalon explosion, a similar biodiversity of life that occurred 33 million years prior.
- Great Ordovician Biodiversification Event (GOBE)
