= Andrew Parker (zoologist) =

Australian zoologist

Andrew Parker (born 1967) (PhD Macquarie University) is a zoologist who has worked on biomimetics. He worked at the Natural History Museum in London, and from 1990 to 1999 he was a Royal Society University Research Fellow and is a research associate of the Australian Museum and University of Sydney and from 1999 until 2005 he worked at the University of Oxford. As of 2018 Parker is a visiting research fellow at Green Templeton College where he is head of a research team into photonic structures and eyes.

== "Light Switch Theory" and popular science books ==
In his 2003 book In the Blink of an Eye, Parker proposes that the Cambrian Explosion, as the sudden diversification in animal fossil forms at the start of the Cambrian Period, was due to the development of the vision faculty and the consequent intensification of predation. He calls this the "Light Switch Theory." In particular he concludes that predation with vision led to the development of hard body parts, explaining why the fossil record displayed the Cambrian Explosion at this point in time. The theory received varied reviews; while some were highly critical of the book and its central hypothesis, the majority of others were highly positive. However, an important criticism remained that of timing, of the relationship between the rise of predation and the period when vision developed. In his review of many of the debates about the transformation of life forms around the Precambrian-Cambrian boundary, Martin Brasier argues that predation played a critical role during the Cambrian Explosion, but that Parker's emphasis on vision is misplaced because eyes did not develop until late in the spread of such predation.

His 2006 book, Seven Deadly Colours, Parker describes the variety of methods of producing colour that have evolved in nature, and their implications for animal lifestyles.

Parker is also an agnostic. His 2009 book The Genesis Enigma argues that the Book of Genesis (and especially chapter 1) is surprisingly accurate and in accord with science. This caused him to conclude that the author of Genesis might have been inspired by God, although his work since demonstrates a neutral stance on religion.
