= Diversification rates =

Diversification rates are the rates at which new species form (the Speciation rate, λ) and living species go extinct (the extinction rate, μ). Diversification rates can be estimated from fossils, data on the species diversity of clades and their ages, or phylogenetic trees. Diversification rates are typically reported on a per-lineage basis (e.g. speciation rate per lineage per unit of time), and refer to the diversification dynamics expected under a birth–death process.

A broad range of studies have demonstrated that diversification rates can vary tremendously both through time and across the tree of life. Current research efforts are focused on predicting diversification rates based on aspects of species or their environment. Diversification rates are also subject to various survivorship biases such as the "Push of the past"

== Methods for estimating diversification rates ==
=== Fossil time series ===
Diversification rates can be estimated time-series data on fossil occurrences. With perfect data, this would be an easy task; one could just count the number of speciation and extinction events in a given time interval, and then use these data to calculate per-lineage rates of speciation and extinction per unit time. However, the incomplete nature of the fossil record means that our calculations need to include the possibility that some fossil lineages were not sampled, and that we do not have precise estimates for the times of speciation and extinction of the taxa that are sampled. More sophisticated methods account for the probability of sampling any lineage, which might also depend on some properties of the lineage itself (e.g. whether it has any hard body parts that tend to fossilize) as well as the environment in which it lives.

Many estimates of diversification rates for fossil lineages are for higher-level taxonomic groups like genera or families. Such rates are informative about general patterns and trends of diversification through time and across clades but can be difficult to compare directly to rates of speciation and extinction of individual species.

=== Clade age and diversity ===
Diversification rates can be estimated from data on the ages and diversities of monophyletic clades in the tree of life. For example, if a clade is 100 million years old and includes 1000 species, we can estimate the net diversification rate of that clade by using a formula derived from a birth-death model of diversification:

Equations are also available for estimating speciation and extinction rates separately when one has ages and diversities for multiple clades.

=== Phylogenetic trees ===
Diversification rates can be estimated using the information available in phylogenetic trees. To calculate diversification rates, such phylogenetic trees have to include branch lengths. Various methods are available to estimate speciation and extinction rates from phylogenetic trees using both maximum likelihood and Bayesian statistical approaches. One can also use phylogenetic trees to test for changing rates of speciation and/or extinction, both through time and across clades, and to associate rates of evolution with potential explanatory factors.

== Diversification rates through time and across clades ==
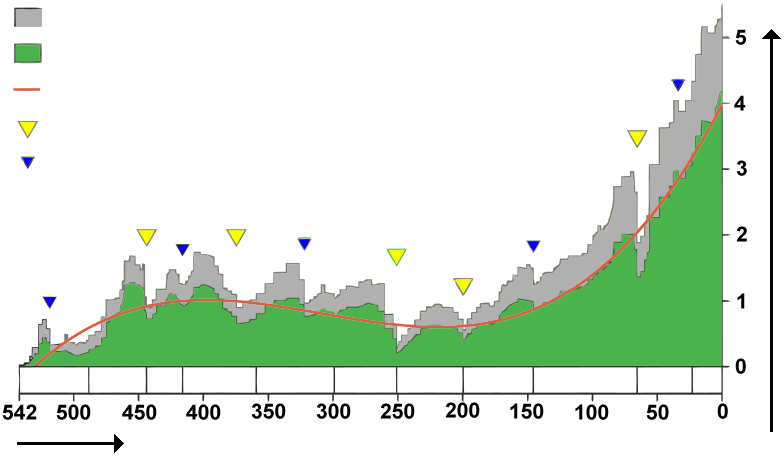
