= Phyla =

Phyla, the plural of phylum, may refer to:

- Phylum, a biological taxon between Kingdom and Class
- by analogy, in linguistics, a large division of possibly related languages, or a major language family which is not subordinate to another

Phyla, as a singular, may refer to:

- Phyla (genus), a genus of plants in the family Verbenaceae
- Phyla-Vell, a Marvel Comics superhero
