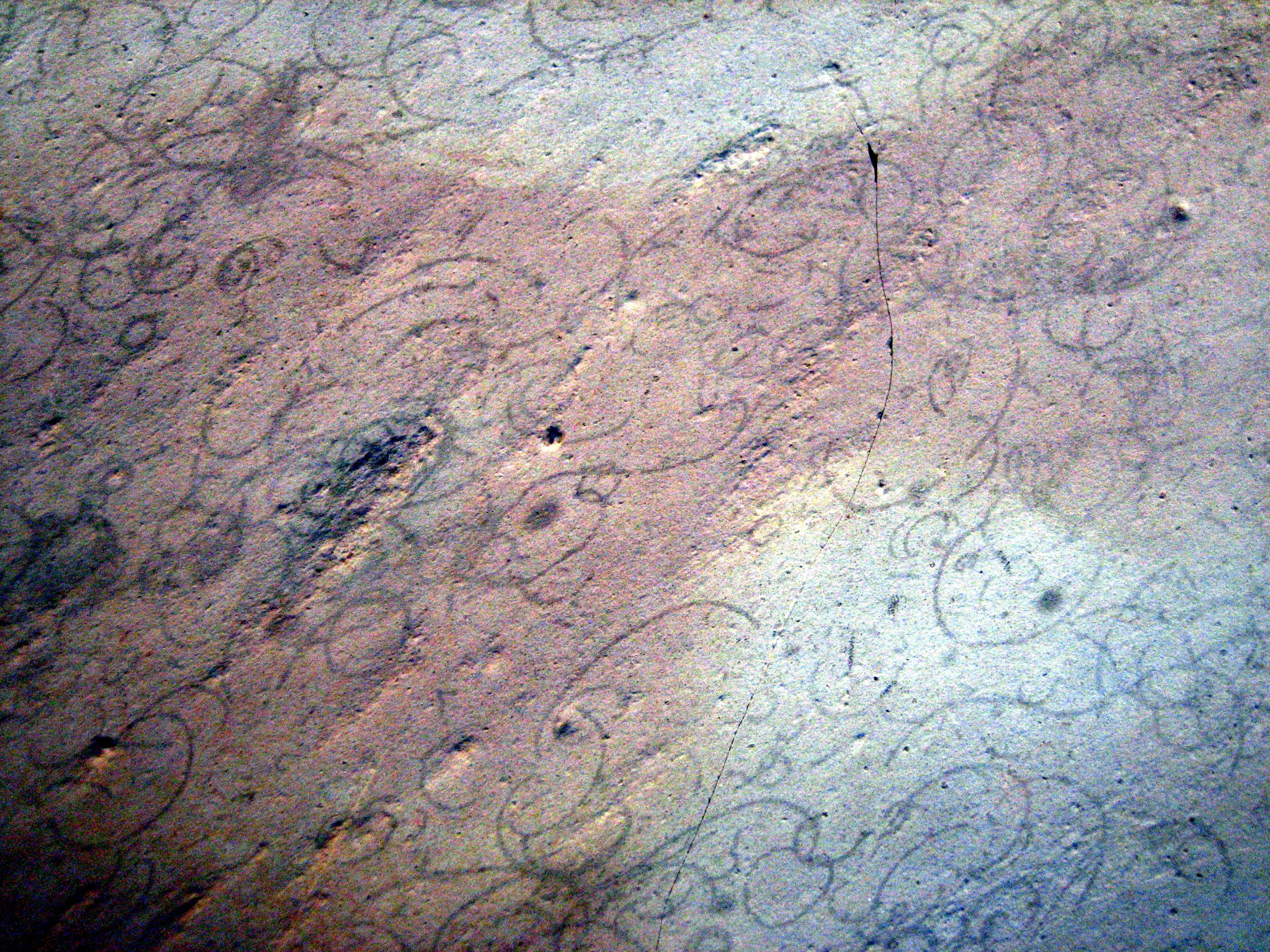
- Grypania spiralis fossil

Scientific classification
- Domain: incertae sedis
- Genus: †Grypania; Walter, Oehler & Oehler, 1976
- Species: †G. spiralis

Binomial name
- †Grypania spiralis Walter, Oehler & Oehler, 1976

= Grypania =

Grypania Temporal range: Paleoproterozoic–Ediacaran

Early, tube-shaped fossil from the Proterozoic eon

Grypania is an early, tube-shaped fossil from the Proterozoic eon. The organism, with a size over one centimeter and consistent form, could have been a giant bacterium, a bacterial colony, or a eukaryotic alga. The oldest probable Grypania fossils date to about 1870 million years ago (redated from the previous 2100 million) and the youngest extended into the Ediacaran period. This implies that the time range of this taxon extended for 1200 million years.
