= Push of the past =

The push of the past is a type of survivorship bias associated with evolutionary diversification when extinction is possible. Groups that survive a long time are likely to have “got off to a flying start”, and this statistical bias creates an illusion of a true slow-down of diversification rate through time.

== Birth–Death modelling in evolutionary studies ==
The evolutionary processes of speciation and extinction can be modelled with a stochastic “birth–death model” (BDM), which is an important component in the study of macroevolution. A BDM assigns each species a certain probability of splitting ($\lambda$) or going extinct ($\mu$) per interval of time. This gives rise to an exponential distribution, with the number of species in a particular clade N at any time t given by

$N(t) = N(t_0) e^{(\lambda - \mu)(t - t_0)}, \ \ \ \ \ t \geq t_0$,

although this expression only gives the expected value when $N$ and $t$ are large (see below).

In the special case of there being no extinction, this simplifies to the so-called "Yule process".

== Lineage-through-time plots ==
A different type of plot of diversity through time, called a “lineage through time” (LTT) plot, retrospectively reconstructs the number of lineages that led to the living species of a group. This is equivalent to constructing a dated phylogeny and then counting how many branches are present at each time interval. As we know retrospectively that all such lineages survived until the present, it follows that no extinction is possible along them. It can be shown that the rate of production of new lineages through time is given by $\lambda-\mu$.

== Survivorship bias in diversification ==
Rather than considering the distribution of all possible stochastic outcomes for given values of $t, \lambda$ and $\mu$ it is also possible to consider what happens when certain conditions of survivorship are imposed on the possible outcomes.

=== Push of the past ===
If a BDM is forward-modelled, i.e., if the fate of an original single species is modelled through time, then a wide range of possible outcomes can occur, as the process is stochastic. With significant extinction rates, any particular clade is likely to be short-lived. However, we know that relatively long-lived clades such as the plants or animals by definition did not go extinct. As a result, their patterns of diversification will be a sub-set of all the possible outcomes for diversifications with their particular values of $\lambda$ and $\mu$ - all patterns with early extinction will be excluded. Imposing the condition of survival on a clade implies that rates of early diversification will be higher than expected. It can be shown that for a long-lived clade, the expected initial short-term rate of diversification is approximately $2\lambda$, as opposed to the long-term rate of $\lambda-\mu$. However, the wide confidence intervals on this value mean that values of initial diversification of up to $3\lambda$ fall within the 95% range. Long-lived clades should thus show a characteristic early burst of diversification that quickly declines to the long-term rate, an effect called the "push of the past".

=== Pull of the present ===
For a normal-sized clade, the push of the past is only observed in the raw count of species through time (e.g. that reconstructed from the fossil record), but the rate of lineage increase is affected as the present is approached. This is because recently created sub-clades within a particular group have an expected lifetime, and as the present is approached, these sub-clades will not have had time to go extinct. Thus, the rate of creation of reconstructed lineages should increase in the near past from $\lambda-\mu$ to $\lambda$ in the present - living species by definition have an observed zero extinction rate. This theoretical apparent increase in the rate of lineage production has been termed the "pull of the present".

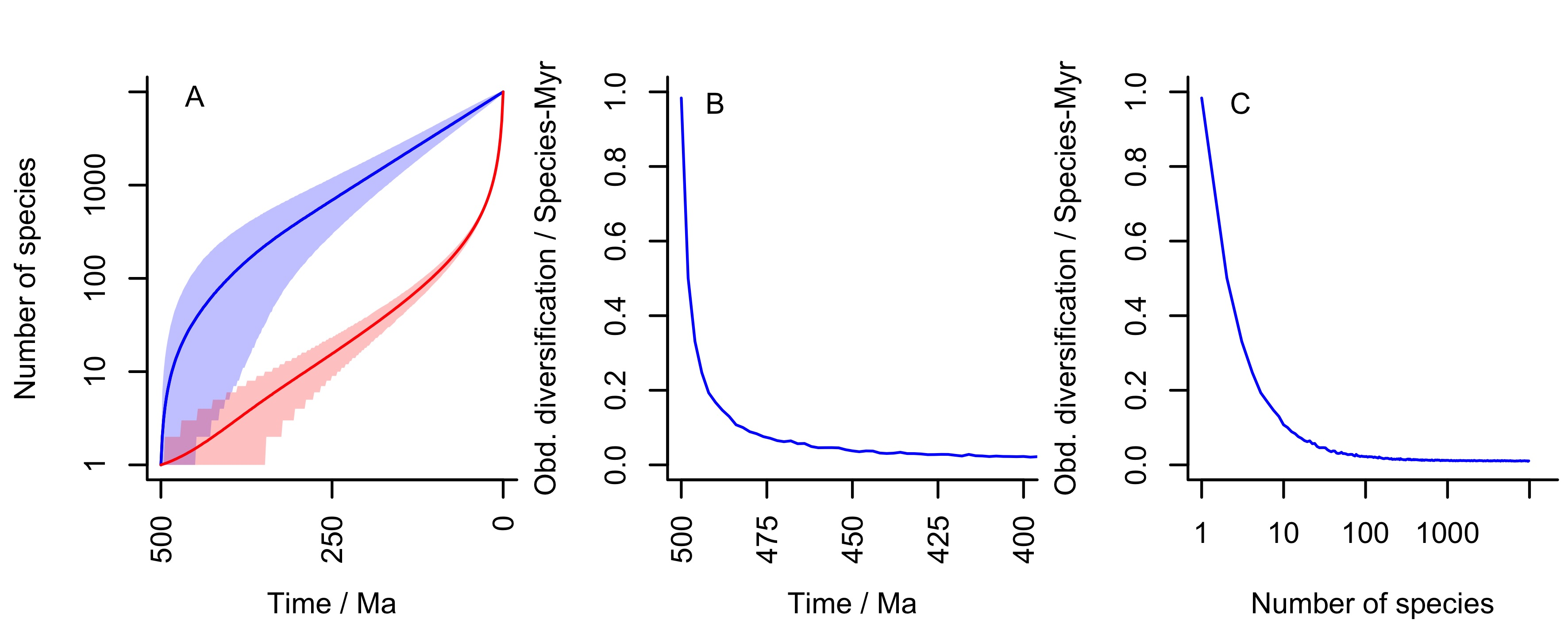
Log plots of species numbers for both raw species (blue lines) and lineages through time (red line) when diversification is conditioned on survival to the past. In A, the rapid early diversification rate in the blue line is the push of past, and the late increase along the red line is the pull of the present. Shading gives 95% confidence intervals. In B and C, the observed slowdown in rates of diversification through time and relative to diversity are plotted. From Budd and Mann (2018).

In reality, the “pull of the present” has proven difficult to demonstrate: rates of lineage production in reconstructed phylogenies often show a slow-down or even decrease as the present is approached. This conundrum has been much discussed, and two major solutions have been proposed: first, that diversification is diversity dependent, so that as the carrying capacity of the environment is reached the rate of lineage production slows; secondly, that our modern species concept does not properly capture the “lineages” of BDM, and that speciation as we recognize it is only the end point of a drawn-out process of splitting of subpopulations through time, each of which could be considered to be a lineage in itself.

== Turnover and survivorship bias ==
For a given diversification rate of $\lambda-\mu$, it is possible to consider high turnover (λ and μ high) and low turnover (λ and μ low) scenarios. As the push of the past and pull of the present depend on the stochastic absence of extinction, it follows that both these effects are greatest when m is high, i.e. in high turnover situations. For example, if λ is 0.6 and μ 0.55 (both measured in rates per species per million years), the initial rate of species production would be 1.2 (2λ); but if they were 0.15 and 0.1 respectively, the initial rate would only be 0.3, even though the overall diversification rate ($\lambda-\mu$) is the same in both cases, 0.05. it can be seen that the initial rate of diversification in the push of the past can be much greater than the background rate; in the first case here, 24 times higher. Such high rates have often been observed at the origin of major groups such as the animals and angiosperms. It is possible that such striking diversifications are thus simply an effect of survivorship bias, and that if overall rates could be measured at their time of origin (including those of groups that quickly went extinct) no unusual rates would be observed. Consideration of the null hypothesis of survivorship bias is thus important when assigning causes to apparent cases of early rapid diversification,

== Crown group origins ==
The effect of the push of the past appears to be the reason that crown groups tend to emerge early within the history of a group as a whole: groups that diversify readily tend to create early new lineages.

== Mass extinctions and the push of the past ==
The push of the past is an expected effect whenever a small group is diversifying and its future survival is known to have occurred. It should thus also be seen in groups that were heavily affected by mass extinctions and went on to rediversify.
