= Paleobiota of the Maotianshan Shales =

Reconstruction of various animals of the Chengjiang Biota.

This is a list of fossils found at Maotianshan Shales, whose most famous assemblage of organisms are referred to as the Chengjiang biota.

The Maotianshan Shales are a series of Early Cambrian sedimentary deposits in the Chiungchussu Formation, famous for their Konservat Lagerstätten, deposits known for the exceptional preservation of fossilized organisms or traces. The Maotianshan Shales form one of some forty Cambrian fossil locations worldwide exhibiting exquisite preservation of rarely preserved, non-mineralized soft tissue, comparable to the fossils of the Burgess Shale of British Columbia, Canada.

== Ecdysozoa ==
Genus	Species	Material	Notes	Images
Acosmia	A. maotiania	9 nearly complete specimens	A small ecdysozoan worm that was originally thought to have been a priapulid worm.	Fossil of Acosmia
Laojieella	L. thecata	One complete and one incomplete specimen	An ecdysozoan worm considered close to the priapulids, it has a spiny proboscis, an elliptical theca on the posterior part of the trunk, and a caudal appendage.	

=== Scalidophora ===
==== Palaeoscolecidomorpha ====
Genus	Species	Material	Notes	Images
Cricocosmia	C. jinningensis		A genus of palaeoscolecid worm. Fossils have been found with smaller worms seemingly attached to them.	Reconstruction of Cricocosmia with parasitic Inquicus
Mafangscolex	M. sinensis; M. yunnanensis			Fossil of Mafangscolex
Maotianshania	M. cylindrica		An extinct palaeoscolecid worm closely related to Cricocosmia.	Fossil of Maotianshania
Tabelliscolex	T. chengjiangensis; T. hexagonus; T. maanshanensis		A genus of palaeoscolecid worm	
Tylotites	T. petiolaris			

==== Priapulida ====
Genus	Species	Material	Notes	Images
Corynetis	C. brevis; C. fortis		An archaeopriapulid worm known from the biota.	Reconstruction of Corynetis
Ercaivermis	E. sparios	A single specimen.	A stem-group priapulid.	
Eximipriapulus	E. globocaudatus		A carnivorous priapulid-like worm that has been found living in the discarded shells of hyoliths.	Reconstruction of Eximipriapulus
Paraselkirkia	P. sinica		An archaeopriapulid worm that resembles another worm, Selkirkia, from the Burgess shale	Reconstruction of Paraselkirkia
Paratubiluchus	P. bicaudatus	Two specimens		Reconstruction of Paratubiluchus
Palaeopriapulites	P. parvus			Reconstruction of Palaeopriapulites
Selkirkia	S. elongata		A burrowing archaeopriapulid worm also known from the burgess shale, alongside the Fezouata Shale.	Fossil of the relatedSelkirkia Columbia
Sicyophorus	S. rarus		A genus of archaeopriapulid worm.	Reconstruction of Sicyophorus
Xiaoheiqingella	X. peculiaris	Fourteen specimens, five previously included in "Yunnanpriapulus"	A priapulid worm thought to belong to the crown group.	Reconstruction of Xiaoheiqingella
Xiaolantianella	X. longibicaudatus		A priapulid worm belonging to the family Priapulidae.	

=== Panarthropoda ===
==== Lobopodia ====
Genus	Species	Material	Notes	Images
Antennacanthopodia	A. gracilis	Known from two specimens, making the species very rare in the Chengjiang.	An unarmoured lobopodian, apparently closely related to Onychophora. The long, paired, cirriform structures at the end of the body could have been sensory, or perhaps represent viscera not externally present in life.	Reconstruction of Antennacanthopodia
Cardiodictyon	C. catenulum		A highly elongate armoured lobopodian, with saddle-shaped sclerites and a lightly sclerotized head.	Reconstruction of Cardiodictyon
Diania	D. cactiformis		A heavily armoured lobopodian.	Reconstruction of Diania
Lenisambulatrix	L. humboldti	A single specimen.	A simple, unarmoured lobopodian.	Reconstruction of Lenisambulatrix
Onychodictyon	O. ferox; O. gracilis	Several complete specimens.	An enigmatic genus of lobopodian, potentially related to either the Luolishaniidae or to Tardigrada. Not always monophyletic.	Reconstruction of Onychodictyon ferox
Paucipodia	P. inermis	Known from well-preserved body fossils.	A large unarmoured lobopodian, commonly found in association with mass death-beds of legless worms and Eldonia. Thought to have been a scavenger.	Reconstruction of Paucipodia

===== Eoconchariidae =====
Genus	Species	Material	Notes	Images
Microdictyon	M. sinicum	Roughly 100 specimens	Microdictyon is known from sclerite microfossils around the globe, while fossils from the Chengjiang are the only in the world to preserve the soft anatomy.	Fossil of Microdictyon sinicum

===== Hallucishaniids =====
Genus	Species	Material	Notes	Images
Luolishania	L. longicruris	Around forty specimens	Type genus of Luolishaniidae. The species Miraluolishania haikouensis is considered a juvenile synonym of Luolishania.	Reconstruction of Luolishania
Facivermis	F. yunnanicus	Thirty specimens, one formerly assigned to "Xishania"	Derived Luolishaniid lobopodian with five setiferous sieving appendages, and lacking any walking limbs. Sometimes discovered living in constructed tubes, buried into the sediment.	Reconstruction of Facivermis
Hallucigenia	H. fortis	Two specimens	A hallucigeniid lobopodian with a bulbous sclerotized head and two pairs of small feeding appendages, borne on a short neck.	Reconstruction of Hallucigenia fortis

===== Siberiidae =====
Genus	Species	Material	Notes	Images
Megadictyon	M. haikouensis	Posterior-most section of the trunk is unknown.	A poorly known siberiid.	Reconstruction of Megadictyon cf. haikouensis
Jianshanopodia	J. decorata	Known from multiple large individuals, all from a singular exposure of the Chengjiang.	A giant siberiid lobopodian related to Megadictyon.	Reconstruction of Jianshanopodia

===== Gilled Lobopodians =====
Genus	Species	Material	Notes	Images
Omnidens	O. amplus; O. qiongqii	Numerous well preserved oral cones and portions of the frontal appendage.	A giant gilled lobopodian, closely related to Pambdelurion. Also present in the Xiaoshiba Biota.	Diagrammatic reconstruction of Omnidens

==== Radiodonta ====
Radiodonta are a group of highly successful panarthropods. The Chengjiang Fauna includes a large number of Radiodont species, primarily from the clade Amplectobeluidae. While hurdiids are poorly known from the formation and surrounding region, several specimens attributable to the family have been discovered, but remain unnamed. Some radiodonts from the Chengjiang defy easy classification, or are otherwise debated in their exact affinity.

Genus	Species	Material	Notes	Images
Houcaris	H. saron; H. consimilis	Isolated appendages.	Previously described as "Anomalocaris" saron.	Appendage of Houcaris saron
Innovatiocaris	I. maotianshanensis; I. multispiniformis; I. sp.	Complete fossil and isolated appendages	Previously assigned to the Anomalocaris genus, and one of the most completely known radiodonts.	Reconstruction of I. maotianshanensis
Laminacaris	L. chimera	Giant isolated appendages, up to nearly 30 centimetres long.	A giant radiodont combining features from different clades.	Appendage of Laminacaris

===== Amplectobeluidae =====
Genus	Species	Material	Notes	Images
Amplectobelua	A. trispinata	Dozens of isolated appendages, and at least one complete body of a juvenile.	A large Amplectobeluid radiodont with long tail furcae. The frontal appendages formed a distinctive claw-like shape.	Reconstruction of Amplectobelua
Lyrarapax	L. trilobus; L. unguispinus	Known from appendages and complete body fossils, including neural anatomy.	Small Amplectobeluid radiodont. Some specimens of this genus represent some of the smallest known radiodonts.	Reconstruction of Lyrarapax unguispinus (left) and Lyrarapax trilobus (right)
Ramskoeldia	R. platyacantha; R. consimilis?	Known from appendages, often associated with GLS plates, sclerites, and swimming flaps.	Large Amplectobeluid radiodonts, with crushing gnathobases. The species R. consimilis may belong to Houcaris instead.	Appendages of Ramskoeldia

===== Anomalocarididae =====
Genus	Species	Material	Notes	Images
Anomalocaris	A. cf. canadensis	Isolated appendages.		Appendage of A. cf. canadensis
Lenisicaris	L. lupata	Isolated appendages.	A second species is included in the genus, Lenisicaris pennsylvanica, from the Kinzers Formation.	Appendage of Lenisicaris
Shucaris	S. ankylosskelos	Isolated appendages.; Oral cone; Partial body	An unusual radiodont seemingly transitional between anomalocaridids and amplectobeluids, with an oral cone similar to the former but gnathobase-like structures similar to the latter.	Appendage model of Shucaris

===== Hurdiidae =====
Hurdiids have historically been considered absent, or at least rare, from the Chengjiang Biota, an observation that researchers have found confusing given their regularity at other sites. In recent years, a number of fragmentary hurdiid fossils have been described, including 3 partial appendages belonging to a new species of Stanleycaris, an isolated sclerite assigned to Cambroraster, Zhenghecaris (the affinities of which, even its identity as a radiodont, remains questionable), and isolated lateral sclerites (also questionable).

Genus	Species	Material	Notes	Images
Cambroraster	C. sp.	Head sclerites.	A large nektobenthic hurdiid, first known from the Burgess Shale. Fossils of Cambroraster are also known from Mantou Formation of North China, making this a very widespread genus. This genus was the first definitive hurdiid known from China.	Fossil of Cambroraster from the Burgess Shale.
Zhenghecaris	Z. shankouensis	Sclerites	Large-sized arthropod carapace, originally described as bivalved arthropod close to Thylacocephala, later reinterpreted as hurdiid radiodont close to Cambroraster, its classification is still discussed. Some fossils, apparently the lateral scelrites of a radiodont, connected anteriorly by a "beak" and featuring two-pronged, wing-like processes posteriorly (similar to the lateral processes of Zhenghecaris's central head sclerite), have also been attributed to Zhenghecaris.	Fossil of Zhenghecaris

==== Arthropoda ====
Genus	Species	Material	Notes	Images
Chuandianella	C. ovata	Several body fossils and carapaces	An enigmatc bivalved arthropod originally considered close to Waptia. It was then discovered that it lacked mandibles and therefore does not belong to Hymenocarina, the Waptiidae family, and even the larger mandibulata clade.	Reconstruction of Chuandianella
Combinivalvula	C. chengjiangensis		An enigmatic bivalved arthropod.	
Cucumericrus	C. decorata	Multiple fragmentary specimens.	An enigmatic arthropod that has been tentatively classified as a possible radiodont, although a position closely related to Erratus as the most primitive deuteropod is more likely.	Reconstructed trunk appendage of Cucumericrus
Cyathocephalus	C. bispinosus			
Diplopyge	D. forcipatus; D. minutus			
Dongshanocaris	D. foliiformis		A small arthropod that is currently "too poorly preserved to verify their identity as a valid taxa".	
Erratus	E. sperare	Several carapaces; Eyes and other body parts	A bivalved arthropod currently placed as the most basal deuteropod, that shows the origins of lungs and legs in early arthropods.	Reconstruction of Erratus
Ercaia	E. miniscula		An arthropod that has been speculated to be an early crustacean.	
Forfexicaris	F. valida		A small bivalved arthropod that somewhat resembles ostracods, but also has large, upward facing appendages with spines.	Reconstruction of Forfexicaris
Glossocaris	G. occulatus			
Isoxys	I. auritus; I. curvirostratus; I. paradoxus		A basal nektonic arthropod that possessed a bivalved carapace, and large circular eyes, related to Surusicaris from the Burgess Shale. Also found in various other Cambrian aged sites.	Reconstruction of Isoxys curvirostratus
Jianshania	J. furcatus		A small, somewhat enigmatic arthropod known from the biota	Fossil of Jianshania
Kunmingocaris	K. bispinosus			
Kylinxia	K. zhangi	Almost complete fossil; Isolated frontal appendages	An early arthropod that may show the "missing link" between early stem-arthropods, and more advanced true arthropods. It possessed frontal appendages similar to radiodonts.	Reconstruction of Kylinxia
Mafangia	M. subscalaria			
Mafangocaris	M. multinodus			
Occacaris	O. oviformis		A predatory arthropod that had spiked frontal appendages similar to those of the megacheirans, and was previously thought to have belonged to that grouping	Reconstruction of Occacaris
Oura	O. megale	A single specimen	An early-diverging deuteropod	
Ovalicephalus	O. mirabilis			Reconstruction of Ovalicephalus
Parapaleomerus	P. sinensis		An arachnomorph arthropod of the group strabopida. Unlike the other members of strabopida, Parapaleomerus lacks dorsal eyes and only possesses ten trunk tergites. The telson has been described as trapezoidal in shape.	Reconstructed carapace of Parapaleomerus
Pseudoiulia	P. cambriensis		A poorly known arthropod that, in 2013, was suggested to be a member of the family Kootenichelidae, alongside Kootenichela and Worthenella.	
Pterotum	P. triacanthus			
Rhombicalvaria	R. acanthi			
Sunella	S. grandis			
Syrrhaptis	S. intes			
Tanglangia	T. caudata			
Tauricornicaris	T. latizonae; T. oxygonae		A giant arthropod once misidentified as a hurdiid radiodont.	
Wutingella	W. bindosa			
Yiliangocaris	Y. ellipticus			
Youti	Y. yuanshi			Fossil of Youti
Yunnanocaris	Y. megista			Fossil drawing of Yunnanocaris

===== Hymenocarina =====
Genus	Species	Material	Notes	Images
Branchiocaris	B. yunnanensis	Several isolated carapaces	Also known in the Burgess Shale by B. pretiosa, B. yunnanensis is only known from isolated carapaces, although it is thought that this may be because in this species the carapace covered the entire body. It also has two morphotypes.	Reconstruction of the related Branchiocaris pretiosa
Canadaspis	C. laevigata		A hymenocarine arthropod, also known from the Burgess Shale by C. perfecta, although some authors believe that both species should be separated into different genera. They were mainly benthic animals.	Reconstruction of Canadaspis laevigata
Clypecaris	C. pteroidea; C. serrata		A hymenocarine arthropod. The species in the genus are primarily distinguished by the presence of a serrated edge on the front of the carapace of C. serrata. C. serrata is noted for the modification of an anterior pair of limbs into spined grasping appendages, indicating a predatory lifestyle.	Reconstruction of Clypecaris serrata
Ercaicunia	E. multinodosa		A hymenocarine arthropod that had a bivalved carapace which covered about a third of its total body-length, and had up to six serrations on its forward edge. The head had a pair of large uniramous antennae, as well as a smaller pair of secondary antennae, and a pair of mandibles and maxillae.	Reconstruction of Ercaicunia
Erjiecaris	E. minusculo		A small euarthropod, and unlike other hymenocarines, it possibly had eyes directly on top of its carapace. It was most likely a nektobenthic animal.	Reconstruction of Erjiecaris
Pectocaris	P. spatiosa; P. eurypetala; P. inopinata		A bivalved arthropod of the hymenocarina grouping. The species P. spatiosa is regarded as a filter feeder, using the setae on the endites of their limbs to filter out matter from the water column	Reconstruction of Pectocaris spatiosa
Synophalos	S. xynos		A hymenocarine notable for fossils showing a bizarre chain of multiple individuals. Although the purpose for this behavior is unknown, it may have served a reproductive, migratory, or defensive purpose, with the authors of the describing paper of this genus considering migration as its most likely function.	Reconstruction of a Synophalos chain
Tuzoia	T. sinensis	several carapaces and soft body parts	A large hymenocarine that possessed a semicircular bivalved carapace, and was one of the largest arthropods from the Cambrian	Reconstruction of Tuzoia sp.
Jugatacaris	A. agillis	several carapaces and soft body parts	A hymenocarine arthropod. The carapace of the animal was around 28 to 37 millimetres (1.1 to 1.5 in) in length, with a pronounced ridge at the top of the carapace separating the two valves, which formed a fin-like structure raised above the carapace. The head had a pair of stalked eyes, as well as a dumbbell shaped medial eye between them. The head also bore a pair of mandibles as well as at least one and possibly two pairs of antennules.	Reconstruction of Jugatacaris
Xiazhuangocaris	X. chenggongensis	a single specimen (NIGP 172765), which only preserves the carapace and trunk regions	A hymenocarine with no known head fossils. The material known show that the carapace had a pronounced pair of notches at its front, as well as a posterior notch at its rear. The body had at least 13 tergite-pleurite rings, which terminate in a pair of rounded caudal rami, which are fringed with setae.	Reconstruction of Xiazhuangocaris

===== Fuxianhuiida =====
Genus	Species	Material	Notes	Images
Chengjiangocaris	C. longiformis; C. kunmingensis		A Fuxianhuiid arthropod with numerous appendages. It is one of the most complete arthropods from the lower Cambrian.	Reconstruction of Chengjiangocaris
Fuxianhuia	F. protensa		A large arthropod named after Fuxian Lake. Some adult specimens are found closely associated with numerous juveniles, indicating a level of parental care.	Reconstruction of Fuxianhuia with associated juveniles
Liangwangshania	L. biloba		A roughly 7 cm long fuxianhuiid, with which Shankouia is potentially synonymous through sexual dimorphism.	

===== Bradoriida =====
Genus	Species	Material	Notes	Images
Comptaluta	C. inflata; C. kailiensis			
Indiana	I. sp.			CT-scan of a fossil of Indiana sp.
Jiucunella	J. paulula			
Kunmingella	K. angustacostata; K. douvillei; K. guanshanensis			Reconstruction of Kunmingella douvillei
Kunyangella	K. cheni			
Liangshanella	L. liangshanensis			
Malongella	M. bituerculata			
Parakunmingella	P. malongensis			
Spinokunmingella	S. typica			
Tsunyiella	T. daindongensis			

===== Megacheira =====
Genus	Species	Material	Notes	Images
Haikoucaris	H. ercaiensis			Reconstruction of Haikoucaris

====== Leanchoiliidae ======
Genus	Species	Material	Notes	Images
Alalcomenaeus	A. cambricus		A small arthropod related to Leanchoilia, also known from the Burgess Shale.	Reconstruction of Alalcomenaeus
Leanchoilia	L. illecebrosa		One of the several species of Leanchoilia, it has known juvenile specimens and the labrum morphology known.	Fossil of Leanchoilia illecebrosa

====== Jianfengiidae ======
Genus	Species	Material	Notes	Images
Fortiforceps	F. foliosa			Reconstruction of Fortiforceps
Sklerolibyon	*S. maomima			Reconstruction of Sklerolibyon
Jianfengia	J. multisegmentalis			Reconstruction of Jianfengia
Parapeytoia	P. yunnanensis		A jianfengiid once misidentified as a radiodont	Reconstruction of known elements from Parapeytoia

===== Marrellomorpha =====
Genus	Species	Material	Notes	Images
Primicaris	P. larvaformis			Reconstruction of Primicaris

===== Artiopoda =====
Genus	Species	Material	Notes	Images
Acanthomeridion	A. serratum	Multiple Specimens.		Reconstruction of a fully grown Acanthomeridion
Cindarella	C. eucalla			Reconstruction of Cindarella
Kuamaia	K. lata; K. muricata			Reconstruction of Kuamaia lata
Panlongia	P. tetranudosa			Fossil of Panlongia
Pygmaclypeatus	P. daiensis			CT-scan of a specimen of Pygmaclypeatus
Retifacies	R. abnormalis			Reconstruction of Retifacies
Saperion	S. glumaceum			
Sidneyia	S. malongensis; S. minor; S. sinica			Reconstruction of Sidneyia minor
Sinoburius	S. lunaris			Reconstruction of Sinoburius lunaris
Skioldia	S. aldna			
Squamacula	S. clypeata			Reconstruction of Squamacula
Tonglaiia	T. bispinosa	Single specimen.		Holotype of Tonglaiia bispinosa
Urokodia	U. aequalis		An arthropod that had segmentation which resembled that of a millipede, as well as head and tail shields with thorny spikes. Recently, it was recovered as the most basal artiopod.	Reconstruction of Urokodia
Xandarella	X. spectaculum			Reconstruction of Xandarella
Zhugeia	Z. acuticaudata			Holotype of Zhugeia acuticaudata

====== Nektaspida ======
Genus	Species	Material	Notes	Images
Misszhouia	M. longicaudata			Reconstruction of Misszhouia
Naraoia	N. spinosa			Reconstruction of Naraoia spinosa
Kangacaris	K. shui			Reconstruction of Kangacaris zhangi, the type species from Cambrian Australia

===== Trilobita =====
Genus	Species	Material	Notes	Images
Chengjiangaspis	C. chengjiangensis			Reconstruction of Chengjiangaspis
Eoredlichia	E. intermedia			Reconstruction of Eoredlichia
Kuanyangia	K. pustulosa			Fossil of K. pustulosa
Palaeolenus	E. miniscula			Fossil pair of Palaeolenus
Tsunyidiscus	T. aclis			Line drawing of Tsunyidiscus niutitangensis
Wutingapsis	W. tingi			
Yunnanocephalus	Y. yunnanensis			Fossil of Yunnanocephalus

== Spiralia ==
=== Gnathifera ===
Genus	Species	Material	Notes	Images
Amiskwia	A. sinica			
Inquicus	I. fellatus			Reconstruction of Inquicus
Petalilium	P. latus		Possible synonym of Nectocaris pteryx	Fossil of Petalilium

==== Chaetognatha ====
Genus	Species	Material	Notes	Images
Ankalodous	A. ercainella			
Eognathacantha	E. ercainella			Reconstruction of Eognathacantha
Protosagitta	P. spinosa			Fossil of Protosagitta

=== Lophotrochozoa ===
==== Annelida ====
Genus	Species	Material	Notes	Images
Iotuba	I. chengjiangensis			Fossil of Iotuba
Maotianchaeta	M. fuxianella		A possible polychaete worm.	

==== Mollusca ====
Genus	Species	Material	Notes	Images
Orthrozanclus	O. elongata			Reconstruction of Orthrozanclus elongata
Wiwaxia	W. papillo			Reconstruction of Wiwaxia papilio

==== Hyolitha ====
Genus	Species	Material	Notes	Images
Ambrolinevitus	A. maximus; A. platypluteus; A. ventricosus			
Burithes	B. yunnanensis			Fossils of Burithes
Glossolithes	G. magnus			
Linevitus	L. billingsi; L. flabellaris; L. opimus			
Paramicrocornus	P. ventricosus			Fossils of Paramicrocornus
Triplicatella	T. opimus			Reconstruction of Triplicatella

==== Phoronida ====
Genus	Species	Material	Notes	Images
Eophonoris	E. chengjiangensis			

==== Entoprocta ====
Genus	Species	Material	Notes	Images
Cambrotentacus	C. sanwuia			Reconstruction of a pair of Cambrotentacus
Cotyledion	C. tylodes			Reconstruction of Cotyledion

==== Cornulitida ====
Genus	Species	Material	Notes	Images
Cambrocornulitus	C. rarus			

==== Brachiopoda ====
Genus	Species	Material	Notes	Images
Diandongia	D. pista			
Donglongtanella	D. chengjiangensis			Fossil of Donglongtanella
Heliomedusa	H. orienta			Fossil of Heliomedusa
Lingulella	L. chengjiangensis			Fossil of Lingulella chengjiangensis
Lingulellotreta	L. malongensis			
Longtancunella	L. chengjiangensis			
Yuganotheca	Y. elegans			

== Deuterostomia ==
Genus	Species	Material	Notes	Images
Yunnanozoon	Y. lividium		A species of deuterostome animal with controversial taxonomy, with some authors placing it as an chordate, stem-vertebrate, hemichordate, etc.	Fossil of Yunnanozoon

=== Chordata ===
Genus	Species	Material	Notes	Images
Cathaymyrus	C. diadexus; C. haikouensis		A chordate known from the Yunnan Province with potential relations to cephalochordates like lancelets.	Reconstruction of C. diadexus and Vetulocystis
Cheungkongella	C. ancestralis			Reconstruction of Cheungkongella
Haikouichthys	H. ercaicunensis		An early craniate (an animal with a distinct notochord and head) of the Myllokunmingiida order. Some authors consider it potentially synonymous with the contemporary Myllokunmingia.	Reconstruction of Haikouichthys
Myllokunmingia	M. fengjiaoa		A myllokunmingiid known for its wide body plan, sail-like fin on its dorsal plane, and a non-biomineralized skeleton.	Reconstruction of Myllokunmingia
Shankouclava	S. anningense; S. shankouense		Likely one of the earliest known tunicates, alongside Cheungkongella and possibly "Palaeoikopleuria".	Reconstruction of Shankouclava anningense
Zhongjianichthys	Z. rostratus		Another myllokunmingiid known for lacking a dorsal fin, and having a more slim body compared to its two contemporary relatives.	Reconstruction of Zhongjianichthys
Zhongxiniscus	Z. intermedius		An early chordate thought to represent a transitional form between earlier chordates, and more derived craniates.	Reconstruction of Zhongxiniscus

==== Vetulicolia ====
Genus	Species	Material	Notes	Images
Beidazoon	B. venustum			Reconstruction of Beidazoon
Didazoon	D. haoae			Reconstruction of Didazoon
Pomatrum	P. ventralis			Reconstruction of Pomatrum
Heteromorphus	H. confusus; H. longicaudatus			Reconstruction of H. longicaudatus (below much smaller "Form A")
Vetulicola	V. cuneata; V. gantoucunensis; V. rectangulata			Reconstruction of Vetulicola rectangulata
Shenzianyuloma				
Yuyuanozoon	Y. magnificissimi			Reconstruction of Yuyuanozoon
"Form A"				Reconstruction of the small "Form A" (above larger H. longicaudatus)

=== Ambulacraria ===
==== Cambroernida ====
Genus	Species	Material	Notes	Images
Phlogites	P. brevis; P. longus			Fossil of Phlogites
Rotadiscus	R. grandis			Reconstruction of Rotadiscus
Stellostomites	S. eumorphus		Senior synonym of Eldonia eumorpha.	Diagram of Stellostomites

==== Hemichordata ====
Genus	Species	Material	Notes	Images
Cambrobranchus	C. pelagobenthos			
Galeaplumosus	G. abilus			
Yuknessia	Y. simplex			

==== Vetulocystida ====
Genus	Species	Material	Notes	Images
Dianchicystis	D. jianshanensis			
Vetulocystis	V. catenata			Reconstruction of Vetulocystis

== Ctenophora ==
Genus	Species	Material	Notes	Images
Daihua	D. sanqiong			Fossil of Daihua
Dinomischus	D. venustus			Fossil of Dinomischus venustus
Maotianoascus	M. octanarius			Reconstruction of Maotianoascus octanarius
Sinoascus	S. paillatus			Reconstruction of Sinoascus papillatus
Trigoides	T. aclis			
Xianguangia	X. sinica		Commonly interpreted as a ctenophore	Fossil of Xianguangia

== Porifera ==
Genus	Species	Material	Notes	Images
Allantospongia	A. mica			
Choia	C. xiaolantianensis			Fossil of Choia xiaolantianensis
Choiaella	C. radiata			
Hazelia	H.			
Leptomitella	L. confusa; L. conica; L. metta			
Leptomitus	L. teretiusculus			
Paradiagoniella	P. conica; P. magna; P. marsupiata; P. oliviformis; P. xiaolantianensis			
Paraleptomitella	P. dictyodroma; P. globula			
Quadrolaminiella	Q. crassa; Q. diagonalis			Quadrolaminiella diagonalis fossil
Saetaspongia	S. densa			
Sinoflabrum	S. antiquum			Fossil of Sinoflabrum
Triticispongia	T. diagonata			

== Cnidaria ==
Genus	Species	Material	Notes	Images
Archisaccophyllia	A. kunmingensis			Fossil of Archisaccophyllia
Nailiana	N. elegans			
Priscapennamarina	P. angusta			
Yunannoascus	Y. haikouensis		Alternatively interpreted as a ctenophore.	Fossil of Yunannoascus

== Petalonamae ==
Genus	Species	Material	Notes	Images
Stromatoveris	S. psygmoglena			

== Enigmatic ==
Genus	Species	Material	Notes	Images
Allonnia	A. erjiensis; A. phrixothrix			Reconstruction of A. erjiensis (left) and A. phrixothrix (right)
Anthrotum	A. robustus			
Batofasciculus	B. ramificans			Batofasciculus ramificans fossils
Calathites	C. spinalis			
Conicula	C. straita			
Discoides	D. abnormalis			
Hippotrum	H. spinatus			
Jiucunia	J. petalina			
Maanshania	M. crusticeps			
Macrocephalus	M. elongates			
Petalilium	P. latus		Possible synonym of Nectocaris pteryx	Fossil of Petalilium
Parvulonoda	P. dubia			
Phacatrum	P. tubifer			
Phasangula	P. striata			
Pristitoites	P. bifarius			
Rhipitrus	R. calvifer			

== Miscellaneous macroalgae ==
Macroalgae rank fourth in species-level diversity behind arthropods, priapulids, and sponges, and account for 71.5% of total abundance from the biota, particularly dominated by unattached (floating, planktonic, and drifting) species.

Genus	Species	Material	Notes	Images
Enteromorphites	E. intestinalis		Sessile, attached to the substrate.	Line drawing of Enteromorphites siniansis from the Dengying Formation
Fuxianospira	F. gyrata	The most common species of macroalgae present, accounting for 52% of all macroalgae fossils reported from the Chengjiang.	Unattached (planktonic, drifting, floating)	
Liulingjitaenia	L. alloplecta		Unattached (planktonic, drifting, floating)	Line drawing of Liulingjitaenia alloplecta
Longfengshania	L. stipitata; L. spheria; L. cordata		Sessile, attached to the substrate.	
Megaspirellus	M. houi			Fossil of Megaspirellus
Morania	M. fragmenta		Unattached (planktonic, drifting, floating)	Fossil of Morania fragment from the Cambrian Wheeler Shale of Utah, USA.
Paralongfengshania	P. sicyoides		Sessile, attached to the substrate.	
Paradelesseria	P. sanguinea		Unattached (planktonic, drifting, floating)	
Plantulaformis	P. sinensis		Sessile, attached to the substrate.	
Punctariopsis	P. latifolia; P. simplexis		Sessile, attached to the substrate.	
Sinocylindra	S. yunnanensis; S. linearis		Unattached (planktonic, drifting, floating)	Fossil of Sinocylindra yunnanensis
Tawuia	T. sp.		Unattached (planktonic, drifting, floating)	Fossil of Tawuia sp.
Yunnanospirellus	Y. typica; Y. elegans		Unattached (planktonic, drifting, floating)	

== See also ==
- List of Xiaoshiba Biota species
- List of Guanshan Biota species
