= Priapulus tuberculatospinosus =

Scientific classification
- Domain: Eukaryota
- Kingdom: Animalia
- Phylum: Priapulida
- Class: Priapulimorpha
- Order: Priapulimorphida
- Family: Priapulidae
- Genus: Priapulus
- Species: P. tuberculatospinosus

Binomial name
- Priapulus tuberculatospinosus Baird, 1868

Synonyms
- Priapulus caudatus var. antarcticus Michaelsen, 1889; Priapulus fuegensis Lahille, 1899

Species of priapulid worm

Priapulus tuberculatospinosus is a species of priapulid worm within the family Priapulidae. The species is found distributed in the southern hemisphere around Antarctica in the Southern Ocean and south Atlantic Ocean, with it living at depths of 6 to 5289 meters in benthic environments. In this distribution, P. tuberculatospinosus is preyed upon by animals such as gummy sharks and Patagonian blennies.
