= Jiucunella =

Jiucunella Temporal range: Early Cambrian–Mid Cambrian

Scientific classification
- Kingdom: Animalia
- Phylum: Arthropoda
- Order: †Bradoriida
- Genus: †Jiucunella; Hou and Bergström, 1991

Species
- †Jiucunella paulula Hou and Bergstrom, 1991; †Jiucunella phaseloa Betts et al, 2014

Extinct genus of arthropods

Jiucunella is genus of Cambrian arthropod known from the Cambrian Chengjiang biota of China as well as Australia.

== See also ==
- List of Chengjiang Biota species by phylum
