= Ercaivermis =

Ercaivermis Temporal range: Cambrian Stage 3

Scientific classification
- Kingdom: Animalia
- Phylum: Priapulida
- Class: Priapulimorpha
- Order: Priapulimorphida
- Family: Priapulidae
- Genus: †Ercaivermis
- Species: †E. sparios

Binomial name
- †Ercaivermis sparios Wang et al., 2023

Extinct genus of priapulid

Ercaivermis is an extinct genus of priapulid that lived during Cambrian Stage 3. It is closely related to the genera Louisella and Ottoia.

== Description ==
Unusual octagonal symmetry is observed in Ercaivermis sparios, the type species. Ercaivermis is characterised by a vermiform body divided into an introvert and annulated trunk. The introvert is armed with scalids in longitudinal rows and circles, with each circle containing eight scalids. The scalids on the second to ninth circles exhibit a quincunx pattern, resulting in sixteen longitudinal rows in Zone I. The eight scalids around the first circle, meanwhile, are out of alignment from the longitudinal rows. The pharynx is inverted, and the densely distributed teeth of Ercaivermis are tiny and decrease in size posteriorly. Ercavermis also possesses a straight gut running from middle trunk to anus, along with four pairs of bilaterally arranged bicaudal hooks around the posterior end.
