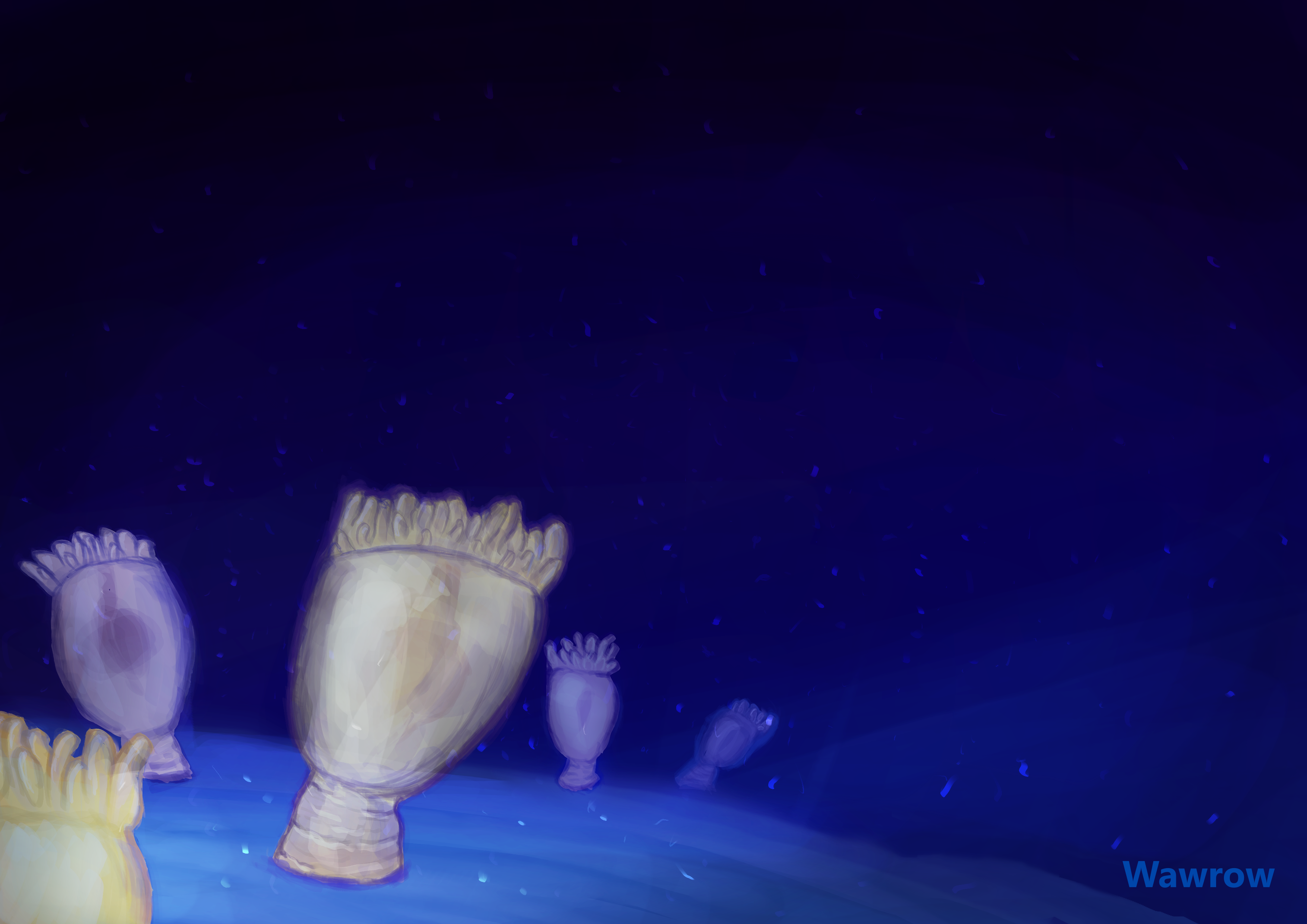
- Artistic reconstruction of a group of Thylacocercus

Scientific classification
- Kingdom: Animalia
- Clade: †Vetulocystida
- Family: †Vetulocystidae
- Genus: †Thylacocercus; Halgedahl, Jarrard and Conway Morris in Conway Morris et al., 2015

Type species
- †Thylacocercus ignota Halgedahl, Jarrard and Conway Morris in Conway Morris et al., 2015

= Thylacocercus =

Thylacocercus Temporal range: 501 Ma Early Cambrian

Genus of vetulocystids

Thylacocercus is a monotypic genus of vetulocystid from the Wheeler Shale of Utah that is tentatively placed within the family Vetulocystidae. Its discovery extended the temporal range of vetulocystids from the Lower Cambrian Stage 3 to the Middle Cambrian Stage 5 (Drumian), and the geographic range from South China to Laurentia., It contains a single species Thylacocerus ignota.

== Etymology ==
The genus name is derived from Greek roots and describes the animal’s form: thylacos refers to the bag-like shape of the anterior region, while kerkus denotes the tail-like posterior. The species name ignotus, likewise derived from Greek, reflects its uncertain phylogenetic position and unusual appearance.

== Description ==
Thylacocercus is unlike the Chengjiang lagerstatte vetulocystids from China both in being more recent and in having a crown of what appear to be broad tentacles at the top of its anterior section.

In addition to being somewhat larger than Vetulocystis and Dianchicystis, the anterior section of Thylacocercus is more cup-like, and the posterior section does not show any signs of segmentation. The anterior section is also smooth, lacking the cones and suspected respiratory organ diagnostic of the Chengjiang vetulocystids, although these absences may be artifacts of the preservation of the single known specimen.

However, the most significant difference is the crown of what appear to be broad tentacles at the top of the anterior section. These seem to broaden away from the main body, and may show bifurcation. The position of what is interpreted to be an esophagus suggests that the mouth is located in the center of the crown, and may lead to a lateral anus in a similar position as other vetulocystids, albeit lacking the distinctive left postero-dorsal cone. The position of the oral opening would explain the lack of the antero-dorsal cone.

== Phylogeny ==
The higher stratigraphic position supports the possibility that Thylacocercus is more derived than the Chengjiang vetulocystids. If vetulocystids are ancestral to echinoderms, then the tentacles of Thylacocercus could be coleomic structures related to feeding ambulacra. In this scenario, the proposed stem echinoderm Yanjiahella could be interpreted as having characteristics intermediate between Thylacocercus and echinoderms.

An analysis focusing on stem chordates was extended to include vetulocystids, and found weak support for them as a monophyletic clade at the base of the chordate stem (contrary to more typical ambulacrarian placements), with the following internal relationships:

- Vetulocystidae
  - - Thylacocercus
  - - Dianchicystis
    - Vetulocystis
