= Ercaia =

Ercaia Temporal range: Early Cambrian–Mid Cambrian

Scientific classification
- Kingdom: Animalia
- Phylum: Arthropoda
- Genus: †Ercaia; Chen et al. 2001
- Species: †E. minuscula

Binomial name
- †Ercaia minuscula Chen, Vannier and Huang, 2001

Extinct genus of crustaceans

Ercaia is genus of Cambrian arthropod known for being a member of the Chengjiang biota, containing the single species E. minuscula. It has been suggested to be one of the oldest crustaceans ever found.

== See also ==
- Arthropod
- Cambrian explosion
- Chengjiang biota
  - List of Chengjiang Biota species by phylum
