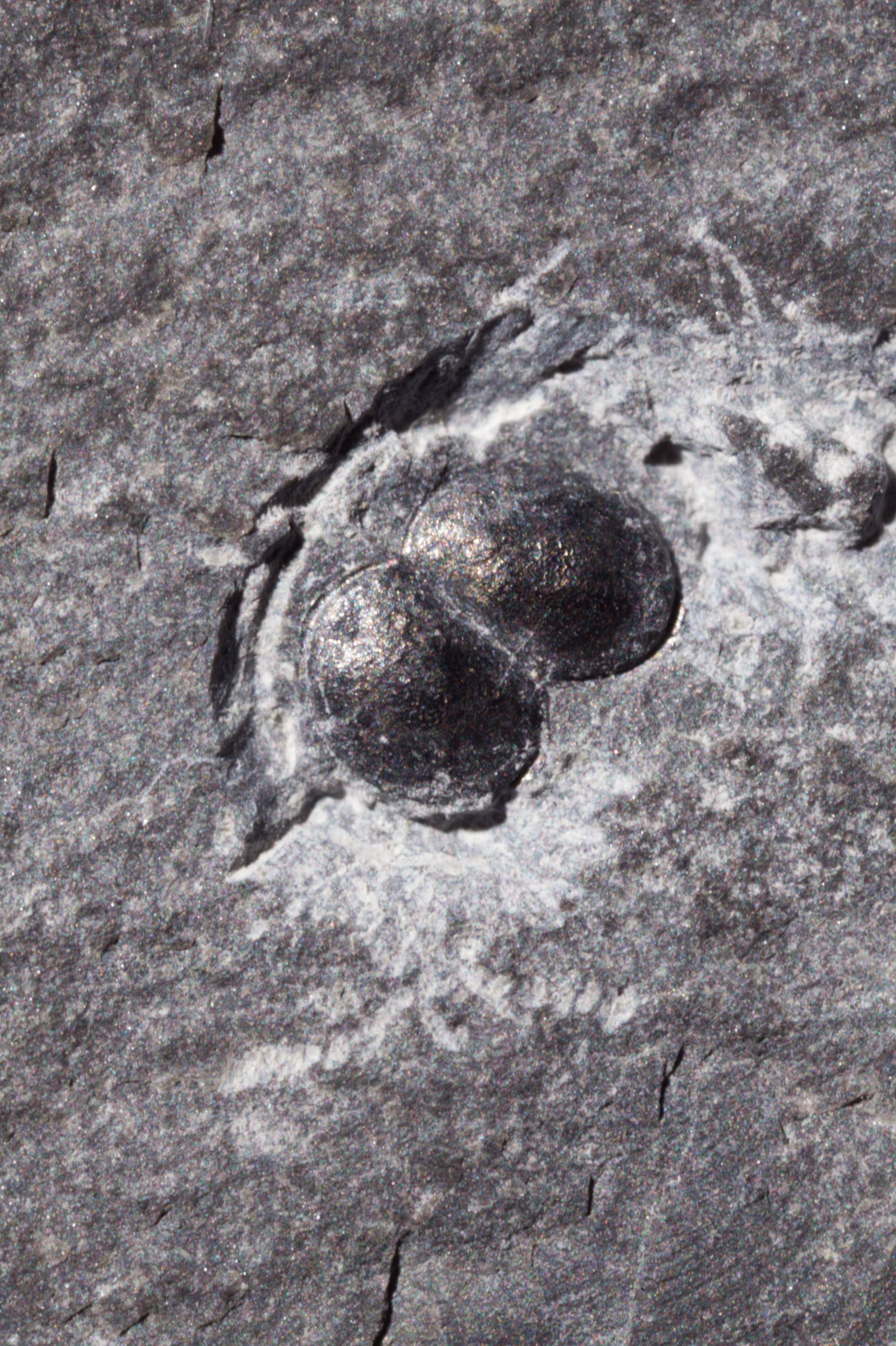
- Holotype of L. burgessensis

Scientific classification
- Kingdom: Animalia
- Phylum: Arthropoda
- Order: †Bradoriida
- Genus: †Liangshanella; Huo, 1956

Type species
- †Liangshanella liangshanensis Huo, 1956

Other species
- †Liangshanella burgessensis Siveter and Williams, 1997; †Liangshanella? qassutit Peel, 2025

= Liangshanella =

Liangshanella Temporal range: Cambrian Stage 3–Mid Cambrian

Extinct genus of cambrian bradoriid

Liangshanella is a genus of Cambrian bradoriid known from the Chengjiang biota and Burgess Shale. 6263 specimens of Liangshanella are known from the Greater Phyllopod bed, where they comprise 11.9% of the community.

== See also ==
- Cambrian explosion
- List of Chengjiang Biota species by phylum
