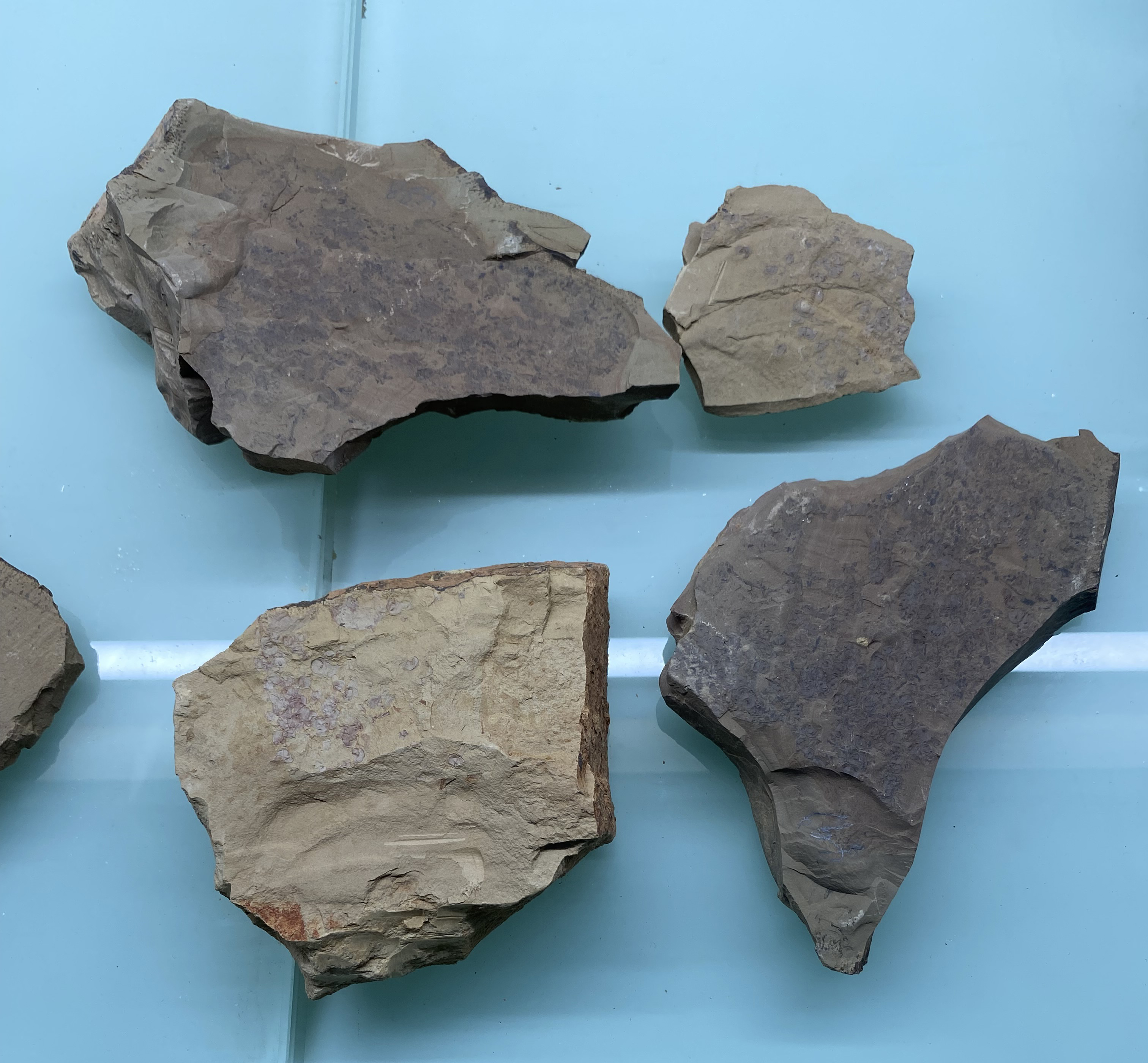
- Fossil of Kunmingella douvillei in Yuxi Museum

Scientific classification
- Kingdom: Animalia
- Phylum: Arthropoda
- Order: †Bradoriida
- Family: †Kunmingellidae; Huo & Shu, 1985
- Genus: †Kunmingella; Huo, 1956
- Species: †K. douvillei

Binomial name
- †Kunmingella douvillei (Mansuy, 1912)

= Kunmingella =

Kunmingella Temporal range: Early Cambrian–Mid Cambrian

Extinct genus of arthropods

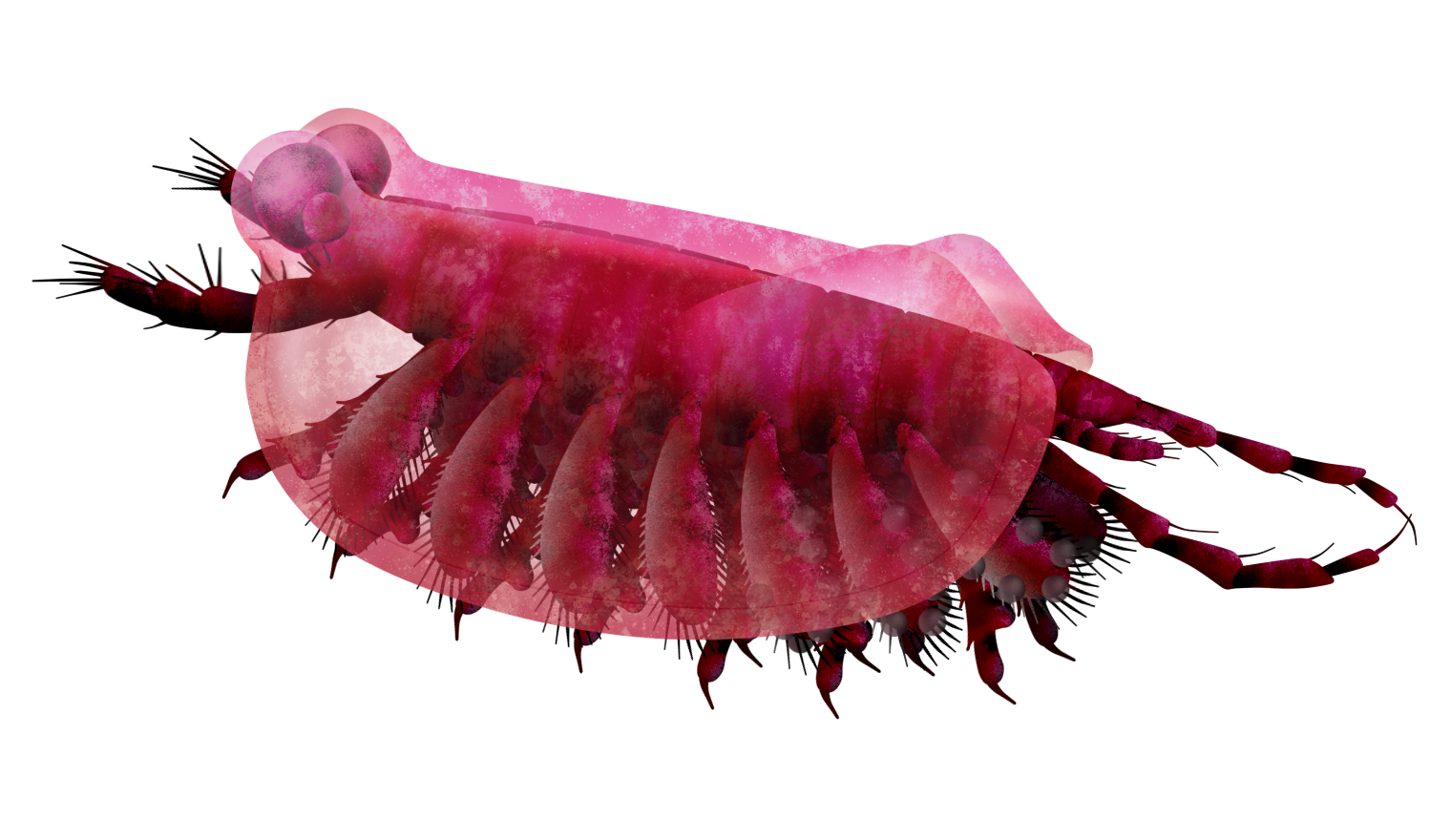
Reconstruction of Kunmingella

Kunmingella is genus of Cambrian bradoriid from the Chengjiang biota, containing the single species Kunmingella douvillei. Kunmingella had 12 appendages, including a pair of antennae as well pairs of biramous limbs, including four anterior pairs of appendages bearing double rows of endites on their endopods, and a posterior 5 with only a single row of endites, as well as two terminal pairs of uniramous limbs. Eggs have been found preserved attached to the posteriormost three pairs of biramous limbs, suggesting it engaged in brood care. Around 50–80 eggs, each around 150–180 μm across were attached in total.

== See also ==
- Cambrian explosion
- List of Chengjiang Biota species by phylum
