= Comptaluta =

Comptaluta Temporal range: Early Cambrian–Mid Cambrian

Scientific classification
- Domain: Eukaryota
- Kingdom: Animalia
- Phylum: Arthropoda
- Order: †Bradoriida
- Genus: †Comptaluta; Öpik, 1968

Type species
- †Comptaluta calcarata Öpik, 1968

Species
- †C. calcarata Öpik, 1968; †C. inflata Cheng, 1974; †C. kailiensis Peng et al. 2010; †C. profunda Öpik, 1968

Genus

Comptaluta is an extinct genus of Cambrian bradoriid arthropod. The genus was erected by Armin Öpik, who described C. calcarata and C. profunda from the Ordian of Australia. Two further species have been described from the Chengjiang biota: C. kailiensis and C. inflata.

== See also ==
- Cambrian explosion
- List of Chengjiang Biota species by phylum
