= Kunyangella =

Kunyangella Temporal range: Early Cambrian–Mid Cambrian

Scientific classification
- Kingdom: Animalia
- Phylum: Arthropoda
- Order: †Bradoriida
- Genus: †Kunyangella; Huo, 1965

Type species
- Kunyangella cheni Huo, 1965

Extinct genus of arthropods

Kunyangella is genus of Cambrian arthropods known for being a member of the Chengjiang biota, containing the single species K. cheni. It has a bivalved carapace and has tentatively been referred to the Bradoriida.

== See also ==
- Arthropod
- Cambrian explosion
- Chengjiang biota
  - List of Chengjiang Biota species by phylum
