= Dongshanocaris =

Dongshanocaris Temporal range: Early Cambrian–Mid Cambrian

Scientific classification
- Kingdom: Animalia
- Phylum: Arthropoda
- Genus: †Dongshanocaris Hou, Bergström, Wang, Feng & Chen, 1999
- Species: †D. foliiformis

Binomial name
- †Dongshanocaris foliiformis Hou, Bergström, Wang, Feng & Chen, 1999

Extinct genus of arthropods

Dongshanocaris is genus of Cambrian arthropod known for being a member of the Chengjiang biota, containing the single species Dongshanocaris foliiformis. It was described by Hou and Bergstrom in 1999. In 2013 Oxford University fellow David Legg described it as "too poorly preserved to verify their identity as a valid taxa [taxon]".

== See also ==
- List of Chengjiang Biota species by phylum
