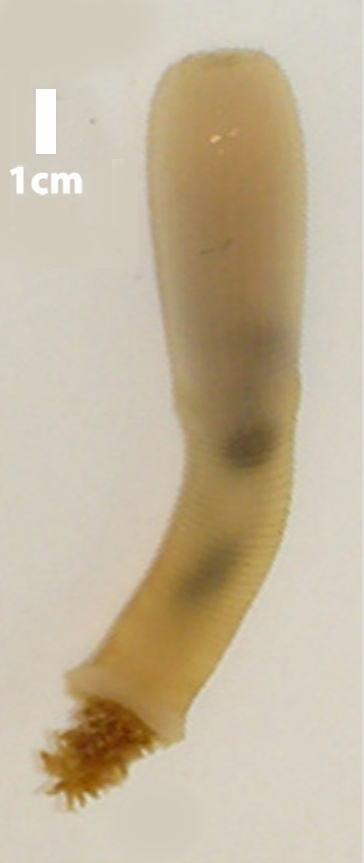
- Priapulus caudatus

Scientific classification
- Domain: Eukaryota
- Kingdom: Animalia
- Phylum: Priapulida
- Class: Priapulimorpha
- Order: Priapulimorphida
- Family: Priapulidae
- Genus: Priapulus; Lamarck, 1816

= Priapulus =

Genus of priapulid worms

Priapulus is a genus of worms belonging to the family Priapulidae.

The genus has cosmopolitan distribution.

Species:

- Priapulus abyssorum Menzies, 1959
- Priapulus caudatus Lamarck, 1816
- Priapulus tuberculatospinosus Baird, 1868
