= Diplopyge =

Diplopyge Temporal range: Early Cambrian–Mid Cambrian

Scientific classification
- Kingdom: Animalia
- Phylum: Arthropoda
- Genus: †Diplopyge; Luo & Hu, 1999

Diplopyge is genus of Cambrian arthropod known for being a member of the Chengjiang biota. It was described by Luo et al. in 1999.

== See also ==
- Arthropod
- Cambrian explosion
- Chengjiang biota
  - List of Chengjiang Biota species by phylum
