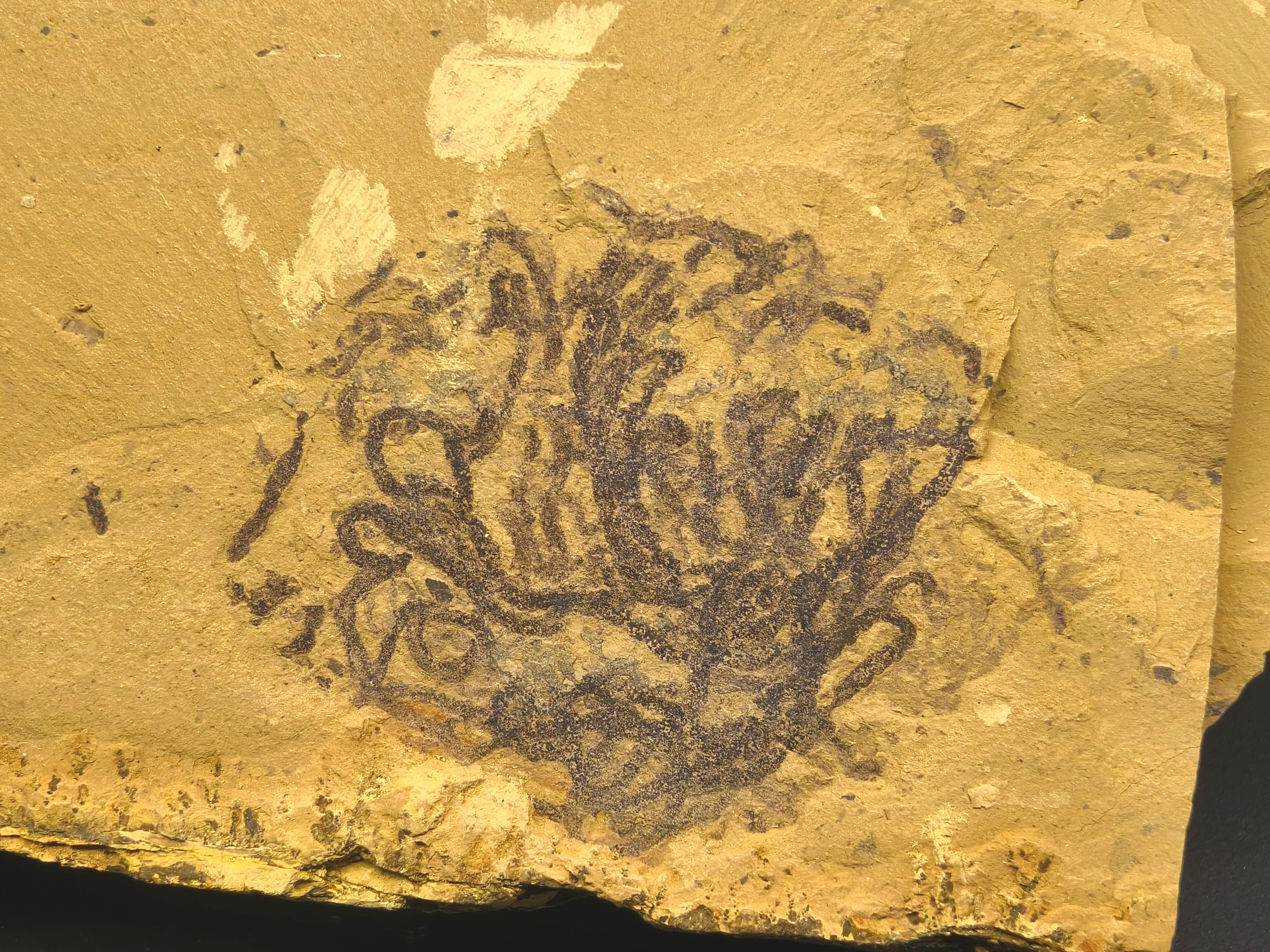
- Fossil Sinocylindra yunnanensis

Scientific classification
- Kingdom: Plantae
- Division: Chlorophyta
- Genus: †Sinocylindra; Chen & Erdtmann, 1991

Type species
- Sinocylindra yunnanensis Chen & Erdtmann 1991

Species
- S. linearis Ye et al. 2019; S. yunnanensis Chen & Erdtmann 1991

= Sinocylindra =

Sinocylindra Temporal range: Ediacaran–Cambrian Series 2

Extinct algae genus

Sinocylindra is an extinct genus of macroalgae that existed between the Ediacaran and Middle Cambrian periods. It is a part of the Chengjiang biota in the Maotianshan Shales in Yunnan, China. Only two species, S. yunnanensis and S. linearis, are described.

== Species ==
Sinocylindra yunnanensis was a cylindrical macroalgae 0.2-0.35 mm wide, that could reach up to 20-40 mm long. Its surface is smooth, and it was likely flexible, as specimens have been found coiled and curved. It was previously thought by some that S. yunnanensis might be a prokaryotic species in the Siphonophycus genus, however due to elements of its morphology such as the size and length of the species, it was determined to most likely be a eukaryotic algae of a previously unknown genus. S. yunnanensis lived roughly between 635-516 million years ago.

Sinocylindra linearis, like yunnanensis, was cylindrical in shape, with a diameter ranging from 0.3-2.0mm, and a length of 5.0-50 mm. It was probably firmer and less flexible than yunnanensis as some specimens found were almost completely straight.

== Discovery ==
Sinocylindra yunnanensis was first described in 1991, found in the Upper Doushantuo shales at Chengjiang, in the Chinese province of Yunnan. Since its discovery, a number of fossils across Southern China have been found, as well as a specimen in the Drumian Marjum formation in Utah, United States.

Sinocylindra linearis was described by researchers in 2017 after being found in the Ediacaran Miaohe member in southern China, where one hundred and twenty-eight specimens were found. The name linearis was given due to the straight, rigid nature of the species.

== See also ==
- Paleobiota of the Maotianshan Shales
