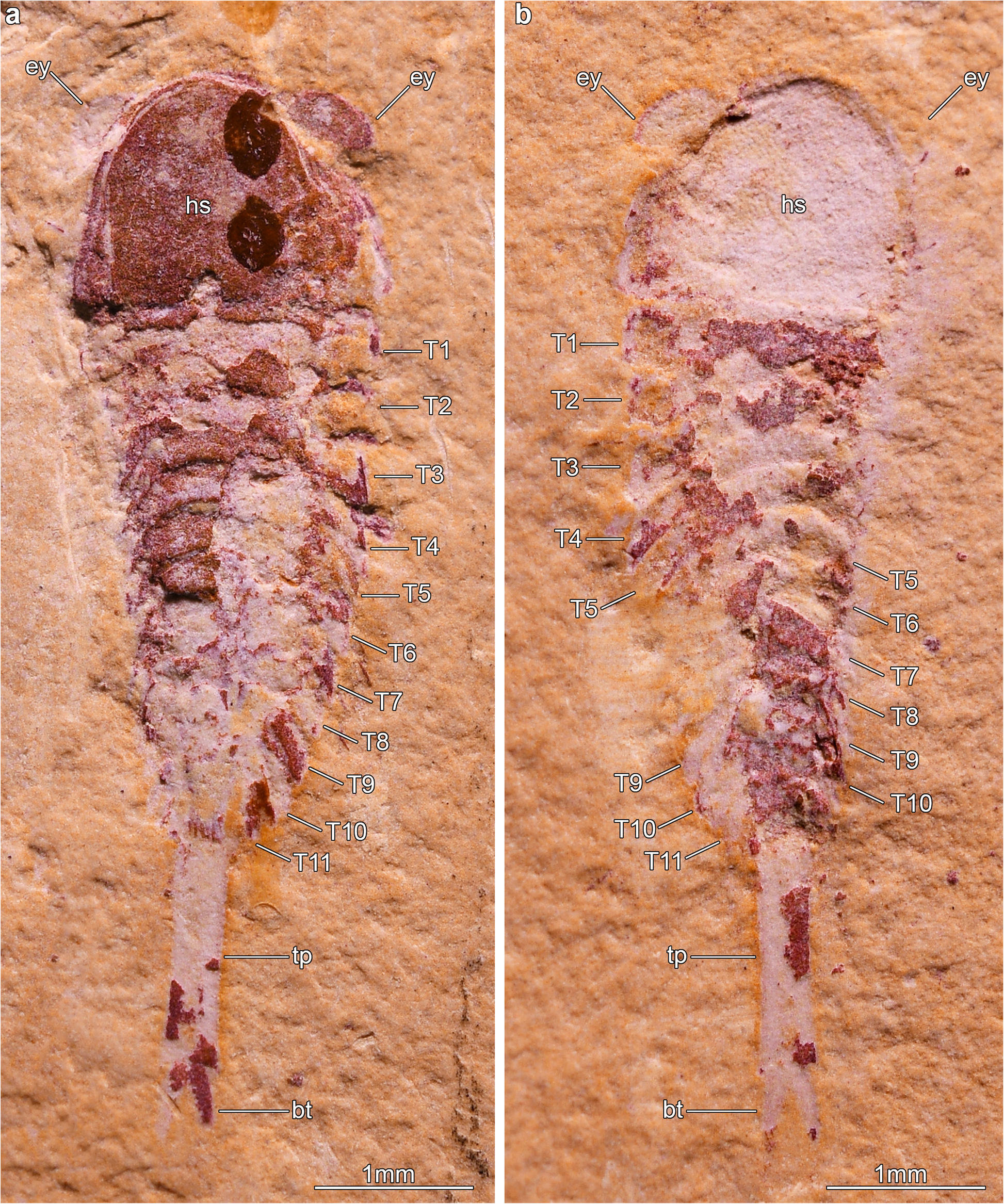
- Part and counterpart of the holotype specimen

Scientific classification
- Kingdom: Animalia
- Phylum: Arthropoda
- Genus: †Jianshania Luo & Hu, 1999
- Species: †J. furcatus

Binomial name
- †Jianshania furcatus Luo & Hu, 1999

= Jianshania =

Jianshania Temporal range: Cambrian Stage 3

Extinct genus of arthropods

Jianshania is a genus of Cambrian arthropod known from the Chengjiang biota, containing the single species J. furcatus. It was described by Luo et al. in 1999. In 2020, a specimen originally assigned to the species was found to represent the separate fuxianhuiid taxon Xiaocaris pending revision of the type specimen.

== See also ==
- List of Chengjiang Biota species by phylum
