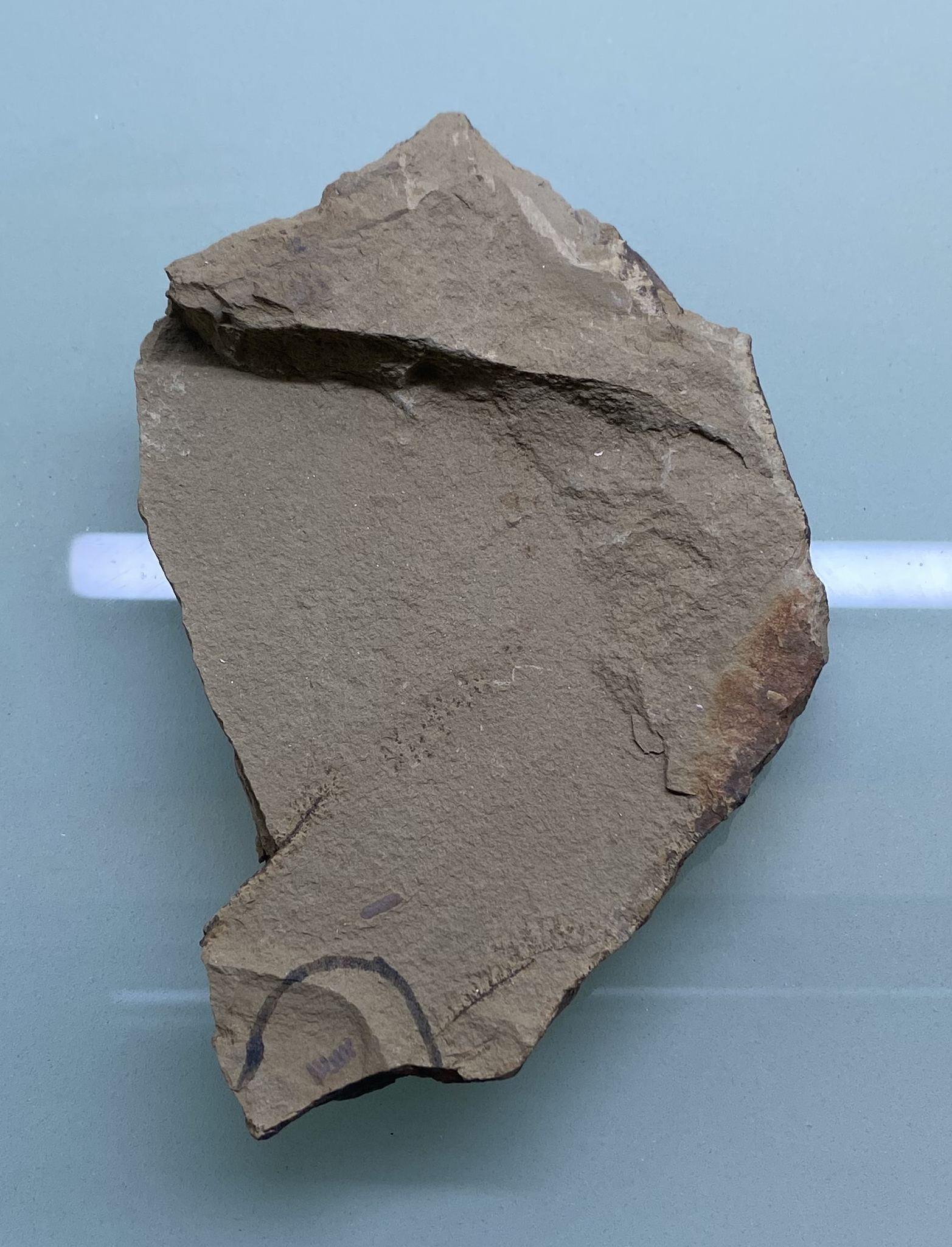
- Fossil of Fuxianospira gyrata in Yuxi Museum

Scientific classification
- Domain: Eukaryota
- (unranked): SAR
- (unranked): Heterokonta
- Genus: Fuxianospira
- Species: F. gyrata

Binomial name
- Fuxianospira gyrata Chen & Zhou, 1997

= Fuxianospira gyrata =

Fuxianospira gyrata Temporal range: Cambrian

Species of single-celled organism

Fuxianospira gyrata is a Cambrian macroalgae found in the Chengjiang lagerstätte. The filaments, preserved in clustered, helicoid groups, are thread-like, plain, and branchless. With their brown and smooth appearance, these structural characteristics bear a resemblance to modern brown algae. Only a limited number of algal species have been identified in the Chengjiang biota, indicating that the diversity within the general algal population may have been relatively low. It is hypothesized that macroalgae may constitute the most fundamental component of the Chengjiang biota's food chain.

It is also theorised that Fuxianospira gyrata, among other Chengjiang algae, is actually a coprolite.

== See also ==
- List of Chengjiang Biota species by phylum
