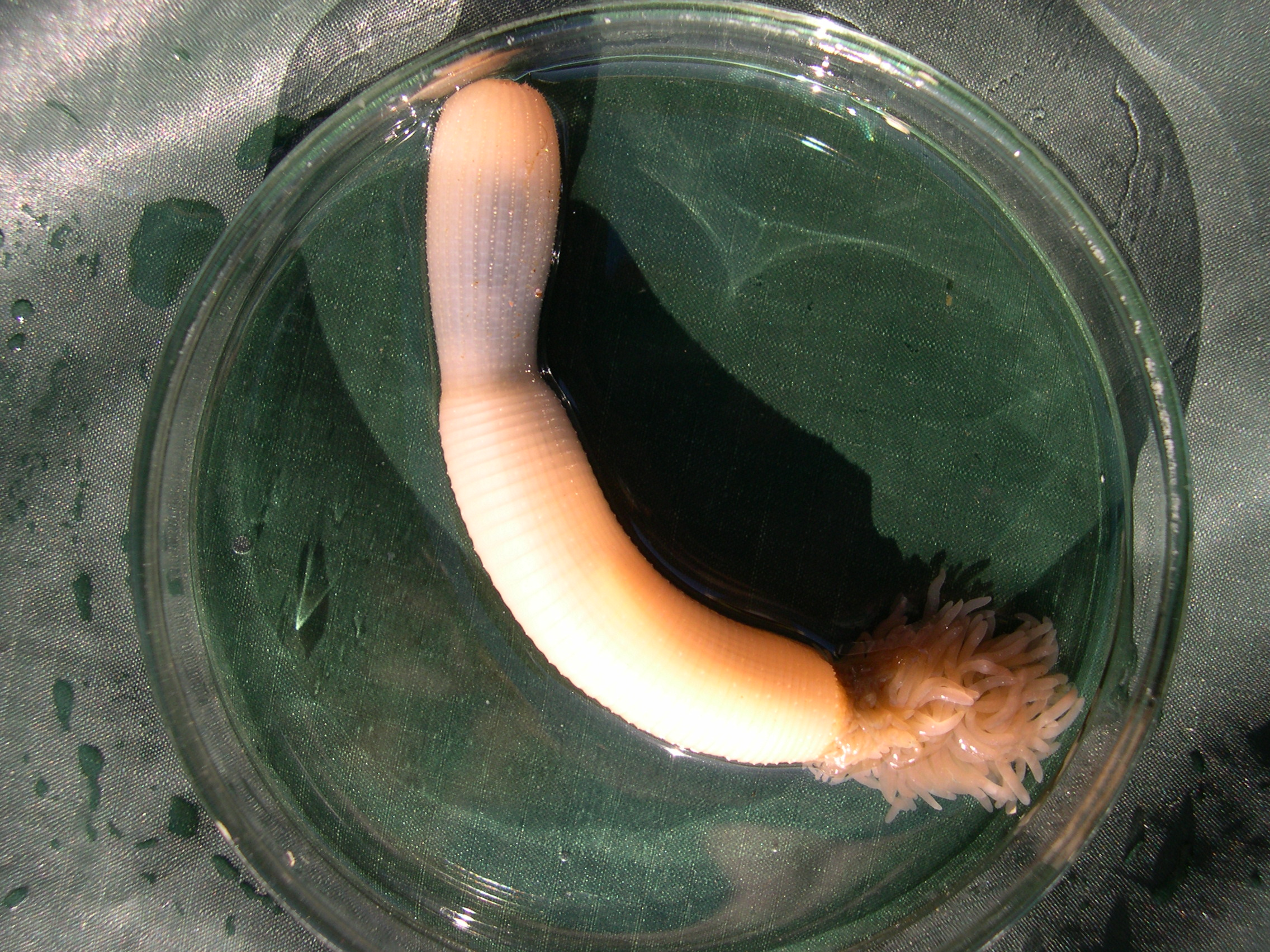

Scientific classification
- Kingdom: Animalia
- Phylum: Priapulida
- Class: Priapulimorpha
- Order: Priapulimorphida
- Family: Priapulidae
- Genus: Priapulus
- Species: P. caudatus

Binomial name
- Priapulus caudatus Lamarck, 1816

Synonyms
- Priapulus brevicaudatus Ehlers, 1861; Priapulus glandifer Ehlers, 1861; Priapulus hibernicus McCoy, 1845; Priapulus intermedius Lenz, 1878; Priapulus multidentatus Möbius, 1873; Priapulus profundus Sanders & Hessler, 1962

= Priapulus caudatus =

Species of priapulid worm

Priapulus caudatus, known as the cactus worm, is a marine invertebrate belonging to the phylum Priapulida. It is a cylindrical, unsegmented worm which burrows in soft sediment on the seabed. It has a circumpolar distribution.

== Taxonomy and evolution ==
Priapulus caudatus is one of only nineteen known species in the phylum Priapulida. French naturalist Jean-Baptiste Lamarck first described it in 1816. Phylogenetic studies have indicated that scalidophorans, to which priapulids belong, are a basal clade of ecdysozoans (animals that grow by shedding their exoskeleton), and thus a sister group to all other ecdysozoans, an assortment including nematodes and arthropods. Priapulids were abundant and widespread in the Early Cambrian period and their tunnelling activities in soft sediment created many trace fossils. P. caudatus is likely to be very similar to the animals existing at that time.

== Description ==
A cylindrical unsegmented worm, P. caudatus grows to a length of 15 cm (6 in). The body is divided into two distinct regions; at the front is the introvert, ridged longitudinally and heavily armed with rows of spines. The mouth is at its tip and is surrounded by seven rows, each with five teeth. The introvert is retractable into the trunk, a longer and broader region with transverse, ring-like markings. It is terminated on the ventral side by a much-branched, tail-like appendage. The front of the tail is sometimes obscured by a swelling of the trunk. The whole animal is a pinkish-brown colour.

== Distribution and habitat ==
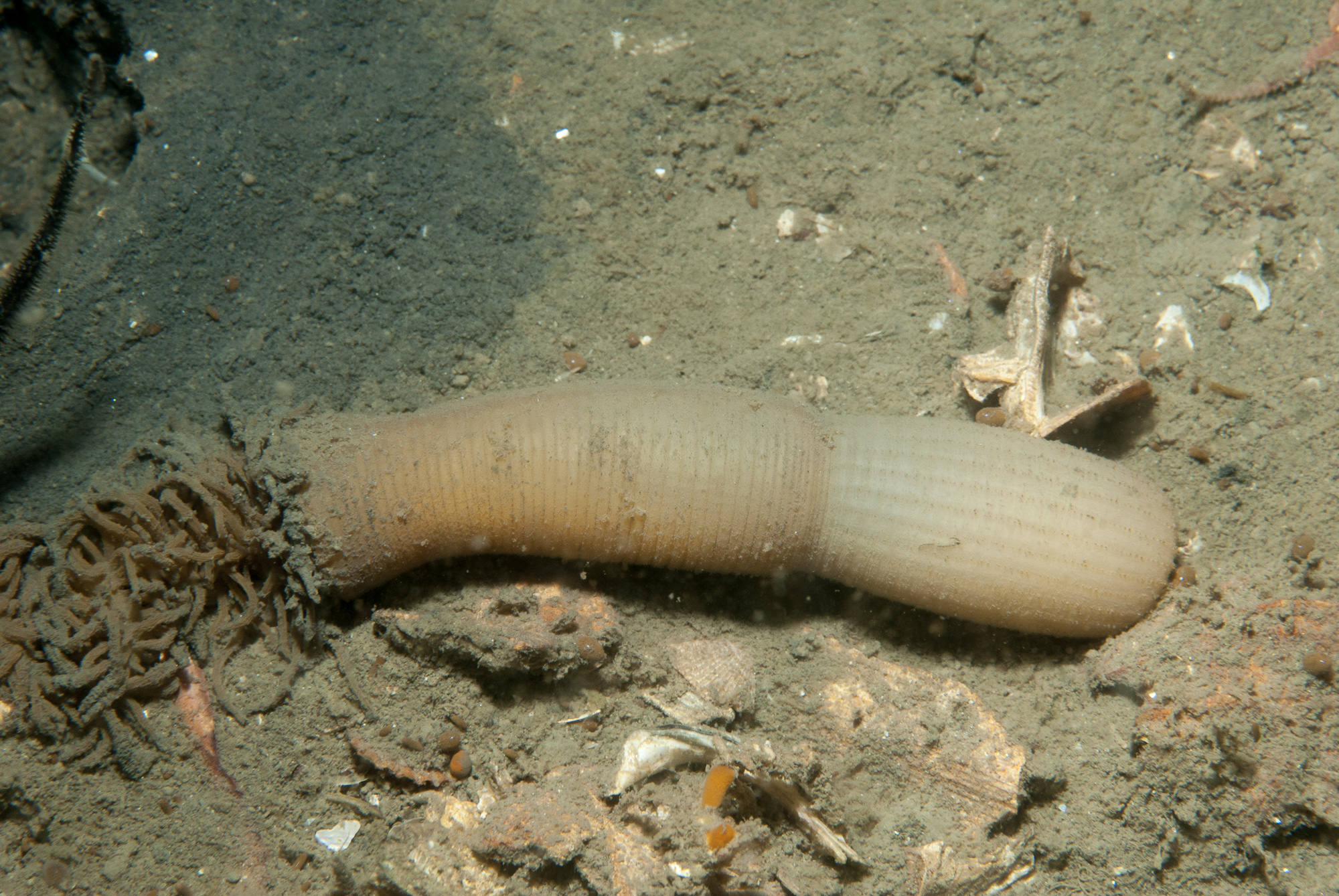
Priapulus caudatus in its habitat

This species has a widespread, northerly circumpolar distribution, being present in New England, eastern Canada, Greenland, Iceland, Scotland and Scandinavia, as well as eastern Russia, Alaska and western United States, and sporadically further south. It is found in the subtidal zone, where it burrows in soft sediments. It is plentiful in Auke Bay, Juneau, in Alaska, where a research study was undertaken in the 1980s. Here it occurred in the depth range of 16 to 187 m (50 to 610 ft) but elsewhere it has been found as deep as 7,500 m (25,000 ft). It can also be found in brackish waters with a salt content of about 7 ppt in parts of the Baltic Sea.

== Ecology ==
Priapulus caudatus has been little studied and its ecology is poorly known. It is believed to be carnivorous while other closely related species are thought to be deposit feeders and detritivores. The sexes are separate and fertilisation is external. Eggs are small and yolky, and cleavage is holoblastic, radial and equal. The larvae live on the seabed and have an introvert, and a trunk enclosed by a thick cuticle into which the introvert can be retracted.
