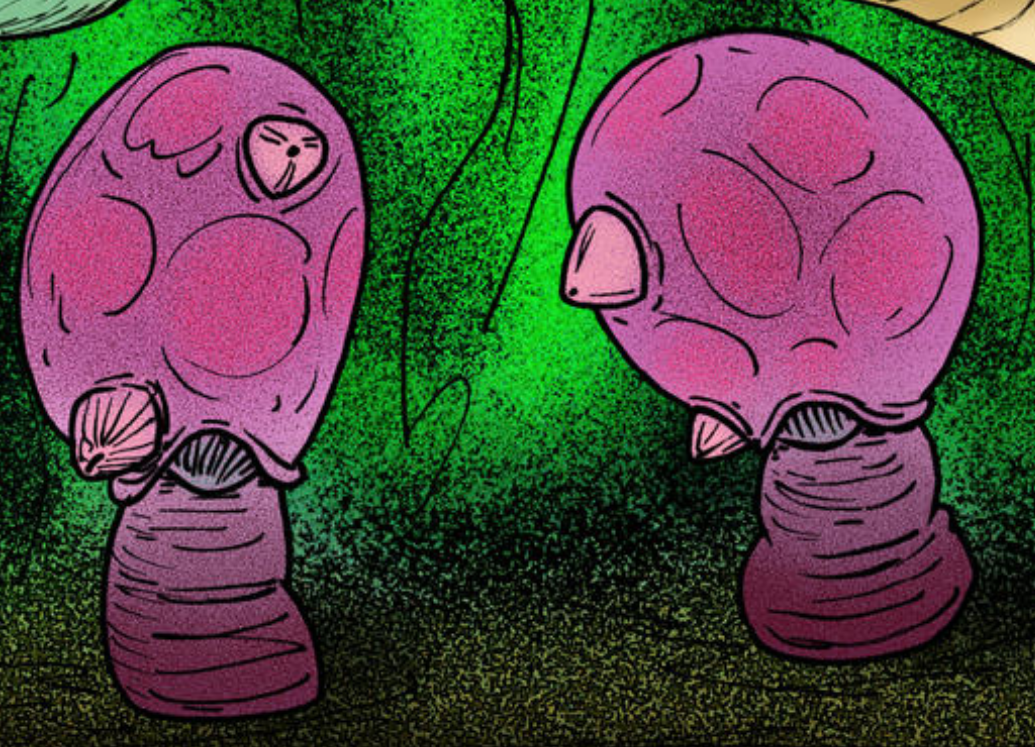
- Vetulocystis catenata

Scientific classification
- Kingdom: Animalia
- Clade: †Vetulocystida
- Family: †Vetulocystidae
- Genus: †Vetulocystis; Shu et al., 2004

Type species
- †Vetulocystis catenata Shu et al., 2004

= Vetulocystis =

Vetulocystis Temporal range: 518–513 Ma Early Cambrian

Genus of vetulocystids

Vetulocystis is an extinct monotypic genus of the family Vetulocystidae. It was found in the Maotianshan Shales, which date to roughly 518 mya.

== Etymology ==
From the latin vetus (old), plus "cystidae" referencing the bag-like shape. The specific name is from the latin catena, meaning chain, as a pun on the fossil as a missing link.

== Description ==
Vetulocystis is distinguished from Dianchicystis by a widening, rather than tapering, "tail" (posterior section). The posterior section appears to be divided into two. The anterior cone is pyramidal with over 50 articulated platelets. The posterior cone is pyramidal with many ribs.

== Phylogeny ==
- Vetulocystidae
  - - Dianchicystis
    - Vetulocystis
  - - Thylacocercus
