= Qiongzhusian =

Cambrian graphical timeline

←	Orsten Fauna

←	Burgess Shale

←	Kaili biota

←	Archaeocyatha extinction

←	Emu Bay Shale

←	Sirius Passet biota

←	Chengjiang biota

←	First Trilobites

←	SSF diversification, first brachiopods & archaeocyatha

←	First halkieriids, mollusсs, hyoliths SSF

←	Baykonurian glaciation

←	Dresbachian extinction

Major Glacial period

Subdivision of the Cambrian according to the ICS, as of 2024.
Vertical axis scale: Millions of years ago

The Qiongzhusian age is a regional subdivision (in China) of Cambrian Series 2 Stage 3; it is correlated with late Atdabanian rocks elsewhere and overlain by the Canglangpuian age.
