= Mongolitubulus =

Mongolitubulus Temporal range: Lower Cambrian–Early Middle Cambrian

Scientific classification
- Kingdom: Animalia
- Phylum: Arthropoda
- Order: †Bradoriida
- Genus: †Mongolitubulus; Missarzhevsky, 1977

Species
- M. decensus Betts et al., 2017; M. henrikseni Skovsted & Peel, 2001; M. squamifer Missarzhevsky, 1977 (type); M. spinosus Hinz, 1987; M. unispinosa Topper et al., 2007; M. reticulatus Kouchinsky et al., 2010

Synonyms
- Rushtonites Hinz, 1987; Tubuterium Melnikova, 2000

Extinct genus of crustaceans

Mongolitubulus is a form genus encapsulating a range of ornamented conical small shelly fossils of the Cambrian period. It is potentially synonymous with Rushtonites, Tubuterium and certain species of Rhombocorniculum, and owing to the similarity of the genera, they are all dealt with herein. Organisms that bore Mongolitubulus-like projections include trilobites, bradoriid arthropods and hallucigeniid lobopodians.

== Morphology ==
The fossils consist of round, slender, pointed, spines with a slight curvature, and are covered with short rhomboid processes that spiral around the spine surface, forming a regular mosaic with a 60° angle of intersection. Spines vary from sub-millimetric up to two centimetres in length, but do not show any growth lines, suggesting that they were moulted and replaced. Species are defined on the basis of the ornamentation, which may of course be convergent.

Spines of Rhombocorniculum cancellatum have a similar surface ornamentation and are also curved, sometimes in two dimensions to form a 'screw'; they had an inner and outer organic layer that surrounded a layer of pillar-like apatite crystals; these enclosed a honeycomb-like structure of narrow edge-parallel chambers. This genus is a useful biostratigraphic marker of the Lower Cambrian. The rhomboid ornament uniformly covers all the spine, with the exception (in some cases) of the smooth-surfaced tip.

Mongolitubulus has a comparable structure; phosphatic fossils show that there was a smooth outer layer about 2–3.5 μm thick, a 10–15 μm-thick inner layer comprising axis-parallel fibres that are each ~1 μm wide, and a large cavity in the centre of the spine.

== Species ==
Species	Distinguishing features	Probable affinity
M. henrikseni Skovsted & Peel, 2001	Ornament of rounded conical protrusions, sometimes associated with faint ridges, at high angle to spine, irregularly arranged at low density. Spines circular in cross-section, straight to gently curved, more parallel-sided than M. squamifer. Tip of spine may be truncated or bifurcate slightly. Original microstructure unknown, but apparently formed two layers. Flaring of base, which is attached to bradoriid carapace.	Bradoriid
M. squamifer Missarzhevsky, 1977 (type)	Regular ornament of rhomboidal to rounded projections arranged in spirals at 60° angle to form regular pattern; these lift slightly from the surface of the spine, directed towards its tip; their intensity fades at the tip, which is generally smooth-walled. Fibrous internal layer with high organic content. Further, very thin layer within this, no structure apparent. Spines are straight or gently curved; the pointed tip is always straight. Circular cross-section. Reaching 2.3 mm in length. Base does not flare.	Trilobite?
M. spinosus (Hinz, 1987)	Described as Rushtonites and since synonymized. Incomplete fragments reach 3 mm in length. Apical angle 5°. Base unknown. Gentle curvature. Spine ornament of rhombi with rounded tips, arrangement slightly deviates from regular pattern, with adjacent rhombi in places so close as to seem to merge. Wall in two layers, microstructure unknown.	Unknown
"Rushtonites" astiaca	Spinose processes, not scales.	Unknown
M. unispinosa Topper et al.. 2007 (=Spinella unialata)	Carapaces with a single central spine. Ornament irregularly distributed, comprising short cones or pustules at steep angle to spine. Spine straight or slightly curved, with pointed tip. Cross-section circular. Base flares to join with carapace.	Bradoriid
M. reticulatus Kouchinsky et al., 2010	Flaring base. Parallel edged near base, becoming highly curved in final quarter of length near tip. Pointed tip and circular cross-section. Two mineralogical layers (both calcium phosphate); inner layer bears transverse lineations, resembling growth lines, not entirely straight. Outer layer bears a polygonal network, grading into a more linear, axis-parallel fabric near the base. Up to 2.5 mm long. Observed attached to carapaces.	Bradoriid

== Affinity ==
M. henrikseni has been shown to be part of the carapace of a bivalved bradoriid arthropod. However, the affinity of M. squamifer is still unresolved; the genus may transpire to be a form taxon, which would require M. henrikseni to be re-classified into a new genus. Unlike the spines of M. henrikseni, which flare out at the base where they attach to the cuticle, the spines of M. squamifer are more parallel-sided, with the fossil material becoming thinner towards the base: consistent with their attachment to non-mineralized cuticle. M. squamifer spines appear to have formed in pairs, owing to their symmetry; on this basis they have been likened to the spines of certain armoured lobopods known from Burgess shale-type deposits. This speculative claim has been substantiated for some material attributed to Mongolitubulus, based on similarities with the spines of the hallucigeniid lobopodians.

The trilobite Hupeidiscus orinentalis has spinose projections with a rhomboidal ornamentation that resembles that seen in Mongolitubulus, so some Mongolitubulus material may represent trilobites.

== Preservation ==
The spines often comprise layers of phosphate, with a central void often infilled with diagenetic phosphate. Similar spines have been recovered from acid macerations, where they are preserved as films of organic carbon.

== Distribution ==
Mongolitubulus is known from the Botomian to the lower strata of the Middle Cambrian, and have a worldwide distribution, being found on every continent including Antarctica.

Rhombocorniculum is known from a variety of localities, including England and Massachusetts.
