= Dianchicystis =

Dianchicystis Temporal range: 518–513 Ma Early Cambrian

Scientific classification
- Domain: Eukaryota
- Kingdom: Animalia
- Clade: †Vetulocystida
- Family: †Vetulocystidae
- Genus: †Dianchicystis; Shu et al., 2004

Type species
- †Dianchicystis jianshanensis Shu et al., 2004

Genus of vetulocystids

Dianchicystis is an extinct genus of vetulocystid deuterostome. It was found in Jianshan, China, near Haikou, in the Cambrian Qiongzhusi Formation.

== Etymology ==
Jianshan is to the locality from which the four initial specimens were collected, and "Dianchi" comes from nearby Dianchi lake.

== Description ==
It is disinguished from Vetulicocystis by an anterior cone that has ribs that are not arranged in platelets, as well as a tapering "tail" (posterior section) with oblique striations. The posterior section has weakly developed furrows, possibly indicating segmentation.

== Phylogeny ==
- Vetulocystidae
  - - Dianchicystis
    - Vetulocystis
  - - Thylacocercus
