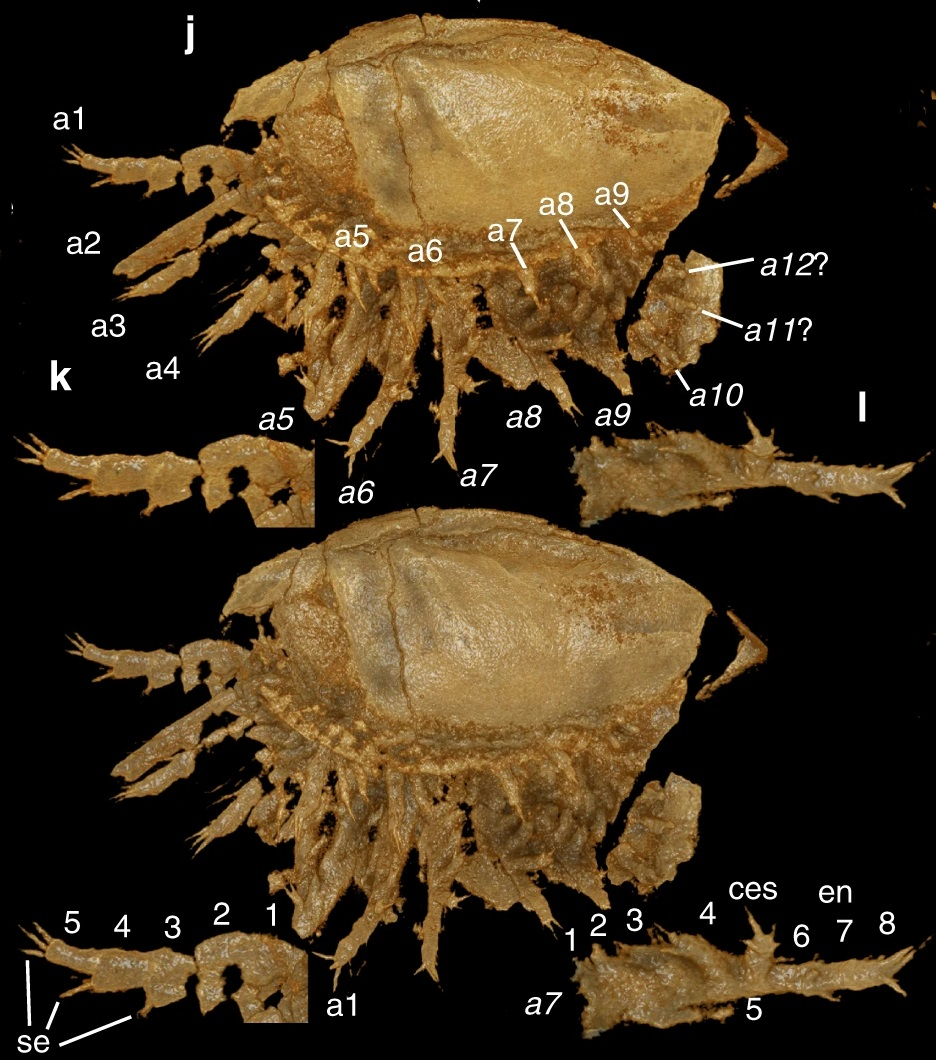
- Stereographic pair of a 3D scan of Indiana sp. from the Maotianshan Shales
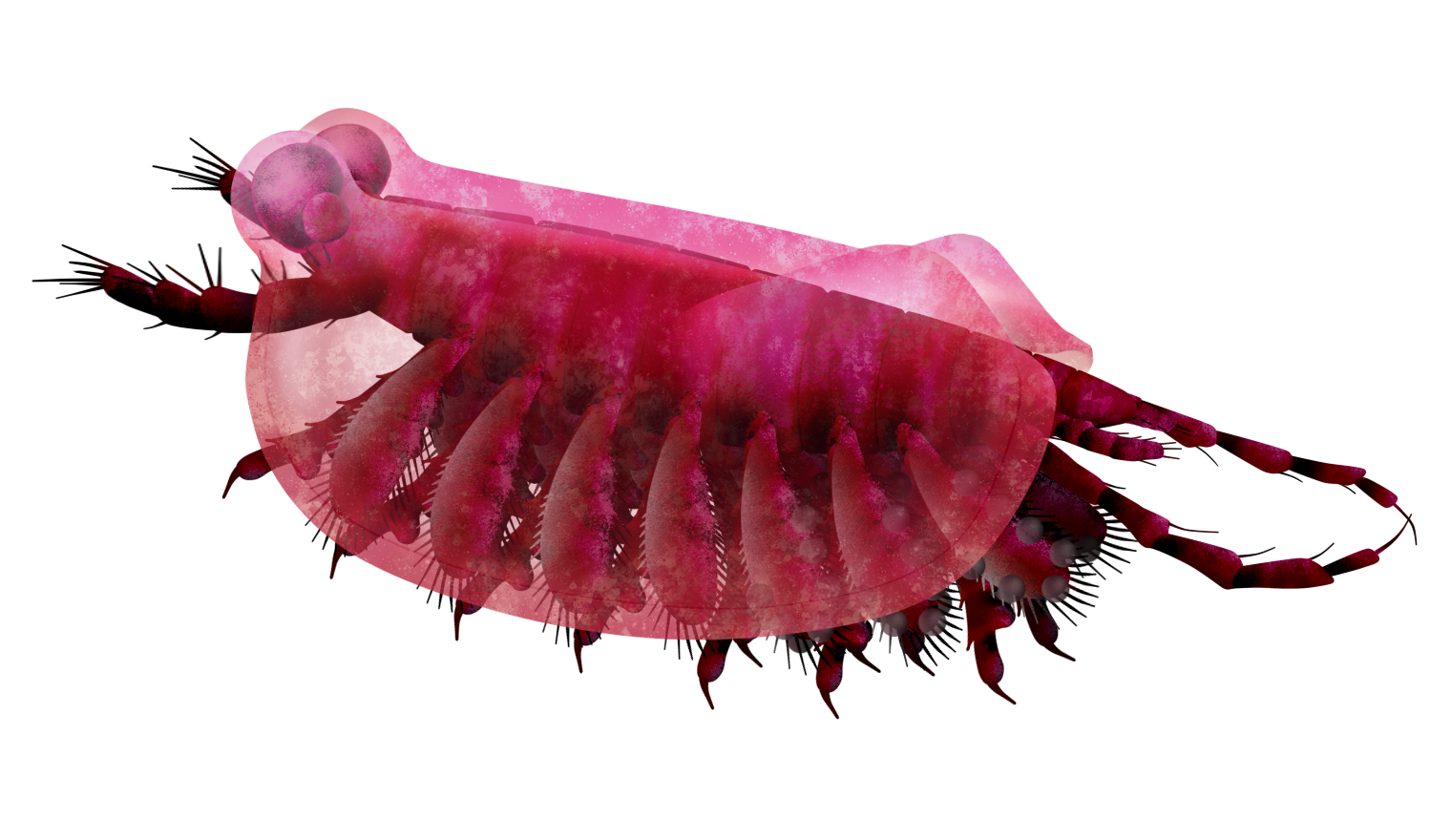
- Life restoration of Kunmingella

Scientific classification
- Kingdom: Animalia
- Phylum: Arthropoda
- Clade: Deuteropoda
- Order: †Bradoriida; Raymond, 1935

Families and genera
- Beyrichonidae; Beyrichona Matthew, 1886; Parahoulongdongella Tong, 1990; Compatulidae Öpik, 1968; Altuella; Zepaera Jones & McKenzie, 1980; Hipponicharionidae Sylvester-Bradley, 1961; Albrunnicola (Beyrichona); Cambroarchilocus; Hipponicharion; Quadricona Topper, 2010; Meishucunella; Neokunmingella Zhang, 1974; Monasteriidae; Epactridion Bengtson, 1990; Svealutidae Öpik, 1968; Liangshanella Huo, 1956; Other genera (may fall into above families or others; please confirm): Albrunnicola; Amphikeropsis; Bradoria; Comptaluta; Dielymella; Haoia; Indiana; Kunmingella; Mongolitubulus(Spinella); Onagrocharion; Shangsiella; Spinospitella; Walcottella; Wimanicharion; and others...

= Bradoriida =

Bradoriida Temporal range: Cambrian stage 3–Mid Ordovician

Extinct order of arthropods

Bradoriida, also called bradoriids, are an extinct order of small marine arthropods with a bivalved carapace, which globally distributed, forming a significant portion of the Cambrian and Early Ordovician soft-bodied communities.

== Affinity ==
Whilst the Bradoriida were traditionally considered as relatives of the modern bivalved arthropod group Ostracoda, the anatomy of their appendages does not support such a relationship; neither are they related to the Cambrian bivalved arthropod group Phosphatocopina. They have been alternatively recovered as stem-group crustaceans, as stem-group mandibulates, or stem-group arthropods, depending on the analysis.

== Description ==
Most bradoriids are only known from their bivalved carapaces, which are small in size, typically up to around 5 millimetres (3/16 in) in length. Preserved soft tissues known from some members, such as Kunmingella, Kunyangella and Indiana suggest that the group was morphologically diverse. Indiana had a pair of antennae followed by 11 pairs of uniramous appendages which were all similar to each other. Kunmingella had 12 appendages, including a pair of antennae as well pairs of biramous limbs, including four anterior pairs of appendages bearing double rows of endites on their endopods, and a posterior 5 with only a single row of endites, as well as two terminal pairs of uniramous limbs. Kunyangella has 4 pairs of appendages on the head each with a distinct morphology, with 9 pairs of trunk appendages, the last being uniramous. In Kunmingella, eggs have been found preserved attached to the posteriormost three pairs of biramous limbs, suggesting it engaged in brood care. Around 50–80 eggs, each around 150–180 μm across were attached in total.

== Ecology ==
Bradoriids are thought to have lived either crawling on the seafloor (epibenthic) or swimming close to the seafloor (nektobenthic). Bradoriids are proposed to have been detritus feeders, scavengers, or micro predators of soft-bodied prey.

== Occurrence ==
Bradoriida are geographically widespread, and first occur in the fossil record shortly before the earliest trilobite fossils. Their taxonomic composition broadly reflects two geographical provinces ("European" and "4A", i.e. America, Asia, Australia, Antarctica) which approximately mirror trilobite provinces, with the 4A area representing warmer waters closer to the palaeo equator. Bradoriid diversity was highest along the coasts of South China and eastern Gondwana (Australia) and was relatively low along the Laurentian coast. Bradoriids severely declined in abundance from the late Middle Cambrian onwards, with only a handful of genera continuing into the Late Cambrian and Early Ordovician.
