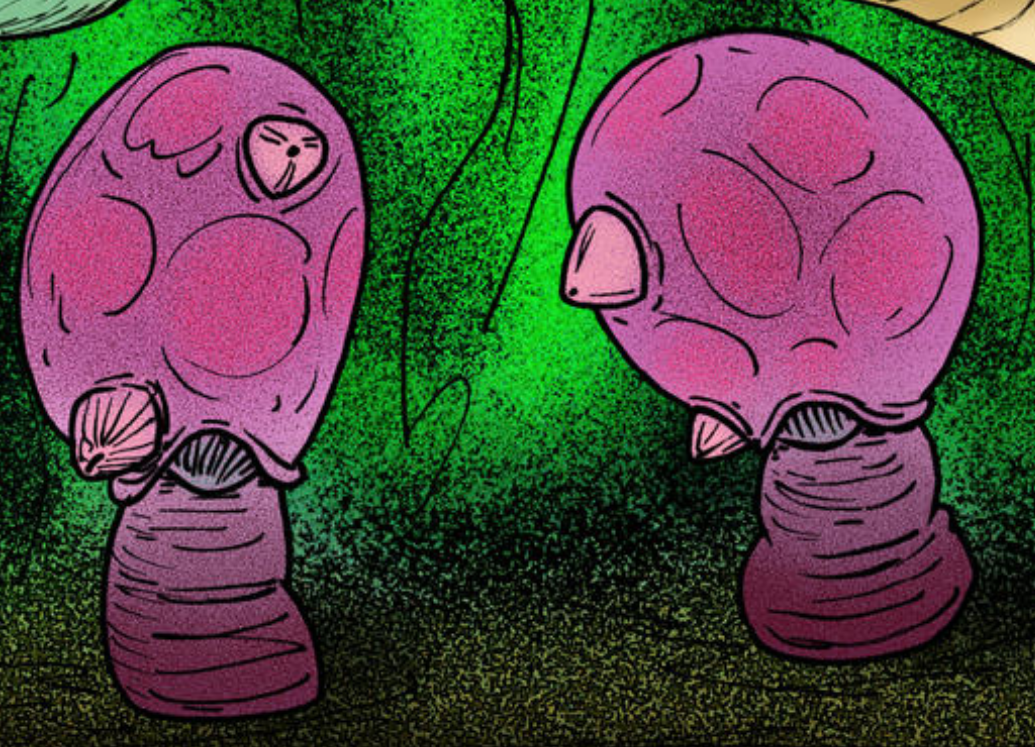
- Reconstruction of 2 specimens of Vetulocystis catenata.

Scientific classification
- Kingdom: Animalia
- Clade: ParaHoxozoa
- Clade: Bilateria
- Clade: Nephrozoa
- Superphylum: Deuterostomia
- Clade: Ambulacraria (?)
- Clade: †Vetulocystida
- Family: †Vetulocystidae; Shu, et al., 2004

Genera
- †Vetulocystis; †Dianchicystis; †Thylacocercus

= Vetulocystidae =

Vetulocystidae Temporal range: Cambrian Stage 3

Extinct family of animals

Vetulocystidae is the only family of the taxon Vetulocystida, which is a group of extinct deuterostomes of uncertain phylogenetic position. Vetulocystidae is made up of the genera Vetulocystis, Dianchicystis and Thylacocercus.

== Etymology ==
The latin vetus means "old," while cystis refers to the organisms' bag-like shape.

== Description ==
The body consists of a voluminous thecal-shaped section (similar to the outer shape of the pterobranchs), where there are two cone-shaped structures (anterior and posterior) and a lenticular respiratory organ; and another small section attached to the substrate.

The anterior cone-shaped structure is believed to have constituted the mouth, due to its similarity to primitive echinoderms (such as stylophorans and blastoids); while the posterior structure (similar to that of the cystoids and eocrinoids) fulfilled the functions of anus and gonopore. Furthermore, and unlike many other echinoderms, these animals lacked a calcified skeleton.

== Paleoecology ==
They were most likely sessile filter feeders, although it is possible that the part attached to the substrate produced a slow displacement, at least for Vetulocystis and Dianchicystis. Thylacocercus shows evidence of a holdfast at the end of its posterior section.

Vetulocystis catenata specimens have been found in close proximity to specimens of the small vetulicolid Beidazoon venustum.

== Phylogeny ==
The affinities of vetulocystida remain unclear, and the only cladistic analysis of the taxon was done as an extension of work focused on stem-chordates.

=== Internal phylogeny ===
Thylacocercus may be more derived than Vetulocystis and Dianchicystis, which its higher stratigraphic position would support. The only available phylogenetic analysis of vetulocystids noted that the interpretation of their morphology "remains highly contested," but found weak support for the following arrangement:

- Vetulocystidae
  - †Thylacocercus
  - - †Dianchicystis
    - †Vetulocystis

=== External phylogeny ===
Numerous placements have been proposed for vetulocystids, without any consensus emerging. These include stem-group ambulacrarians, stem-group echinoderms, stem-group deuterostomes, and even a phylogenetic study that found weak support for a placement at the base of the chordate stem. The following cladogram shows each of these placements with respect to well-established clades (other taxa of uncertain placement, including xenacoelomorphs, cambroernids, and Yanjiahella, are omitted for simplicity):

- Deuterostomia (total group)
  - ? †Vetulocystida
  - Deuterostomia (crown group)
    - Ambulacraria (total group)
      - ? †Vetulocystida
      - - Echinodermata (total group)
          - ? †Vetulocystida
          - Echinodermata (crownward)
        - Hemichordata
    - Chordata (total group)
      - ? †Vetulocystida
      - Chordata (crownward)

==== Possible relationships to vetulicolians and echinoderms ====
Despite noting certain shared surface characteristics with other taxa (such as Tunicata), the discoverers of the first vetulocytids believed them to belong to the Echinodermata stem group, and also to be related to the taxon Vetulicolia. Based on this, Vetulocystida would represent the transition from the body plan of the vetulicolians to one of the echinoderms, as shown by the following cladogram simplified from Shu et al. (2004):

- Deuterostomia (total group)
  - †Vetulicolia
  - Ambulacraria
    - - †Vetulocystida
      - Echinodermata (total group)
        - †Stylophora
        - - †other Homalozoans
          - Echinodermata
            (crown group)
    - Hemichordata

Interpreting the vetulocystids as intermediate between vetulicolians and echinoderms relies on features such as a straight gut, which is seen in the best-preserved specimens as running to the segmented posterior section and a presumed terminal anus, as in vetulicolians. The presence of a single respiratory structure (and possible gill) rather than paired gills could indicate the sort of asymmetry found in echinoderms.

However, a recent review of theories of echinoderm origins disputed such a placement based on the lack of observable echinoderm apomorphies in vetulocystids. Another challenge to the above cladogram is the more recent majority view that vetulicolians are stem chordates, rather than being placed as basal deuterostomes.

==== Possible relationship to Yanjiahella ====
If vetulocystids are ancestral to echinoderms, then the tentacles of Thylacocercus could be coleomic structures related to feeding ambulacra. In this scenario, the proposed stem echinoderm Yanjiahella could be interpreted as having characteristics intermediate between Thylacocercus (as a relatively derived vetulocystid) and echinoderms. While a stem-echinoderm affinity for Yanjiahella is a matter of some debate, the proposed alternatives are also within stem- or crown-group Ambulacraria.

==== Possible relationship to chordates ====
Vetulocystids have alternatively been found to be in the chordate stem group. Cladogram modified after He et al. 2026, finding vetulocystids to occupy a basalmost position in the chordate stem group.

- Deuterostomia
  - Chordata (total group)
    - - - - Chordata (crown group)
          - †Pikaia
        - †Yunnanozoon
      - - †Vetulicolidae
        - †Ooedigera
        - †Didazoonidae
        - †Banffozoa
      - †Nesonektris
    - †Vetulocystida
  - Ambulacraria (total group)
    - - Ambulacraria (crown group)
        - Echinodermata
        - Hemichordata
          - Pterobranchia (total group)
            - Pterobranchia (crown group)
            - †Gyaltsenglossus
          - Enteropneusta (total group)
            - Enteropneusta (crown group)
            - †Spartobranchus
            - †Oesia
      - †Yujingia
    - †Cambroernida
      - - †Eldonioidea
          - †Rotadiscus
          - - †Eldonia eumorpha
            - †Eldonia ludwigi
            - †Pararotadiscus
        - †Phlogites
      - †Herpetogaster

==== Disproven relationship to Saccorhytus ====
An alternative phylogeny connecting both vetulocystids and vetulicolians with Saccorhytus, which was initially thought to be an early deuterostome, was disproven when Saccorhytus was shown to be an ecdysozoan (a protostome) instead.
