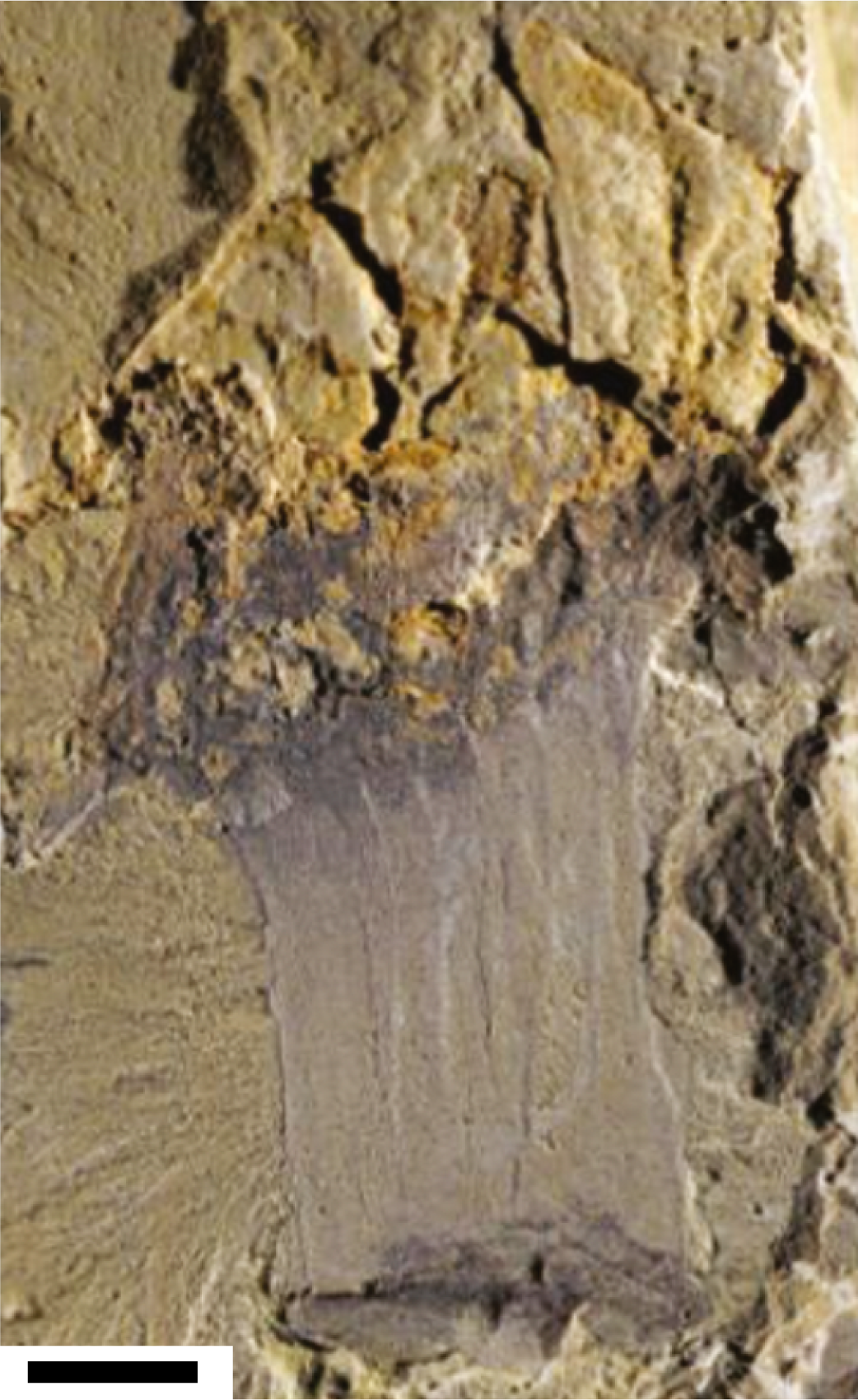
- Fossil of Archisaccophyllia kunmingensis

Scientific classification
- Kingdom: Animalia
- Phylum: Cnidaria
- Subphylum: Anthozoa
- Class: Hexacorallia
- Order: Actiniaria (?)
- Genus: †Archisaccophyllia
- Species: †A. kunmingensis

Binomial name
- †Archisaccophyllia kunmingensis Hou et al 2005

= Archisaccophyllia =

Archisaccophyllia Temporal range: Chengjiang

Genus of sea anemones

Archisaccophyllia is a genus of putative sea anemone whose true affinity remains unclear.
