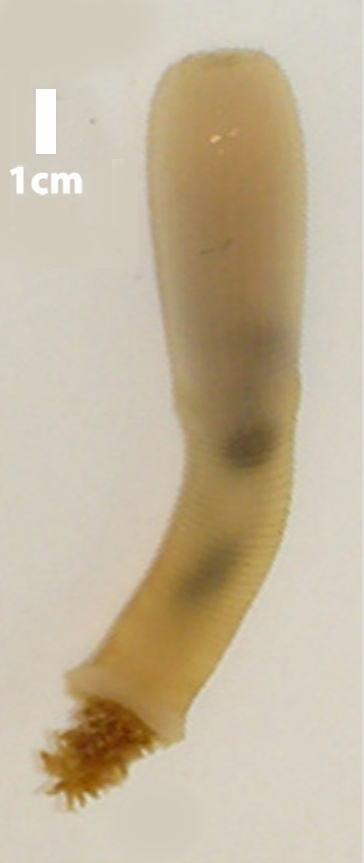
- Priapulus caudatus

Scientific classification
- Domain: Eukaryota
- Kingdom: Animalia
- Phylum: Priapulida
- Class: Priapulimorpha
- Order: Priapulimorphida
- Family: Priapulidae; Gosse, 1855

Genera
- Priapulus Lamarck 1816 (type); Priapulites † Schram, 1973; Priapulopsis Koren & Danielssen, 1875

= Priapulidae =

Priapulidae Temporal range: Recent (Stem-group from the Carboniferous)

Family of priapulid worms

Priapulidae is the canonical family of priapulid worms, comprising Priapulus and Priapulosis as well as the Carboniferous genus Priapulites.

== Systematics ==
Classification and maximum trunk length:

- Family Priapulidae
  - Genus Acanthopriapulus
    - Species A. horridus (24.5 mm)
  - Genus Priapulopsis
    - Species P. australis (50 mm)
    - Species P. bicaudatus (100 mm)
    - Species P. cnidephorus (only known from a postlarval specimen)
  - Genus Priapulus
    - Species P. abyssorum (30 mm)
    - Species P. caudatus (200 mm)
    - Species P. tuberculatospinosus (200 mm)
