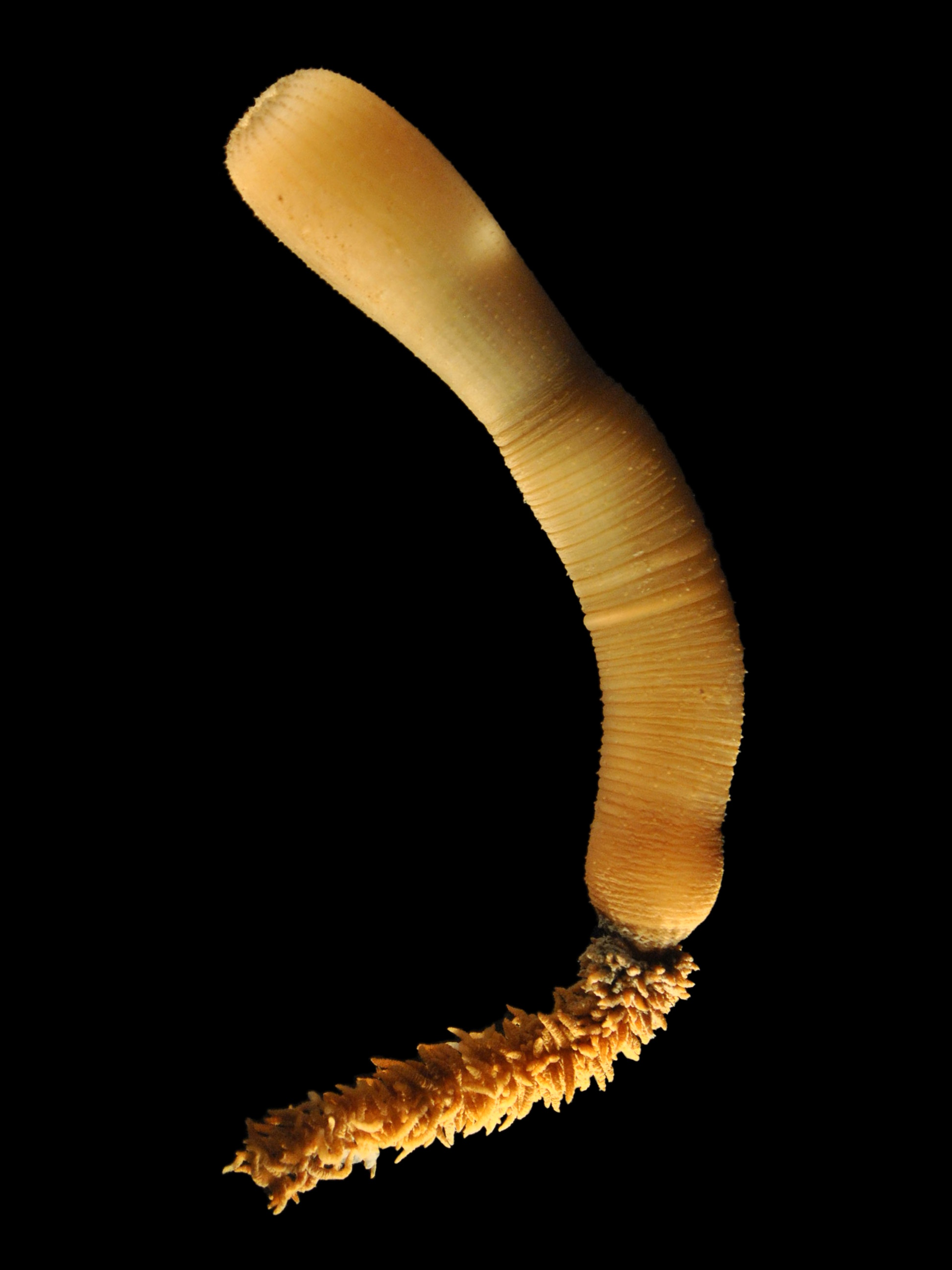
- An adult Priapulus caudatus

Scientific classification
- Kingdom: Animalia
- Phylum: Priapulida
- Class: Priapulimorpha
- Order: Priapulimorphida; Salvini-Plawen, 1974

Families
- Priapulidae; Tubiluchidae

= Priapulimorphida =

Priapulimorphida Temporal range: Moscovian – Recent

Order of priapulid worms

Priapulimorphida is the sole order within the Priapulimorpha, one of the three extant priapulid classes.
