= Maotianshan Shales =

Series of Early Cambrian deposits in the Chiungchussu Formation in China

Maotianshan Shale
- Stratigraphic range: Cambrian Stage 3, Qiongzhusian age local stage ≤518 Ma
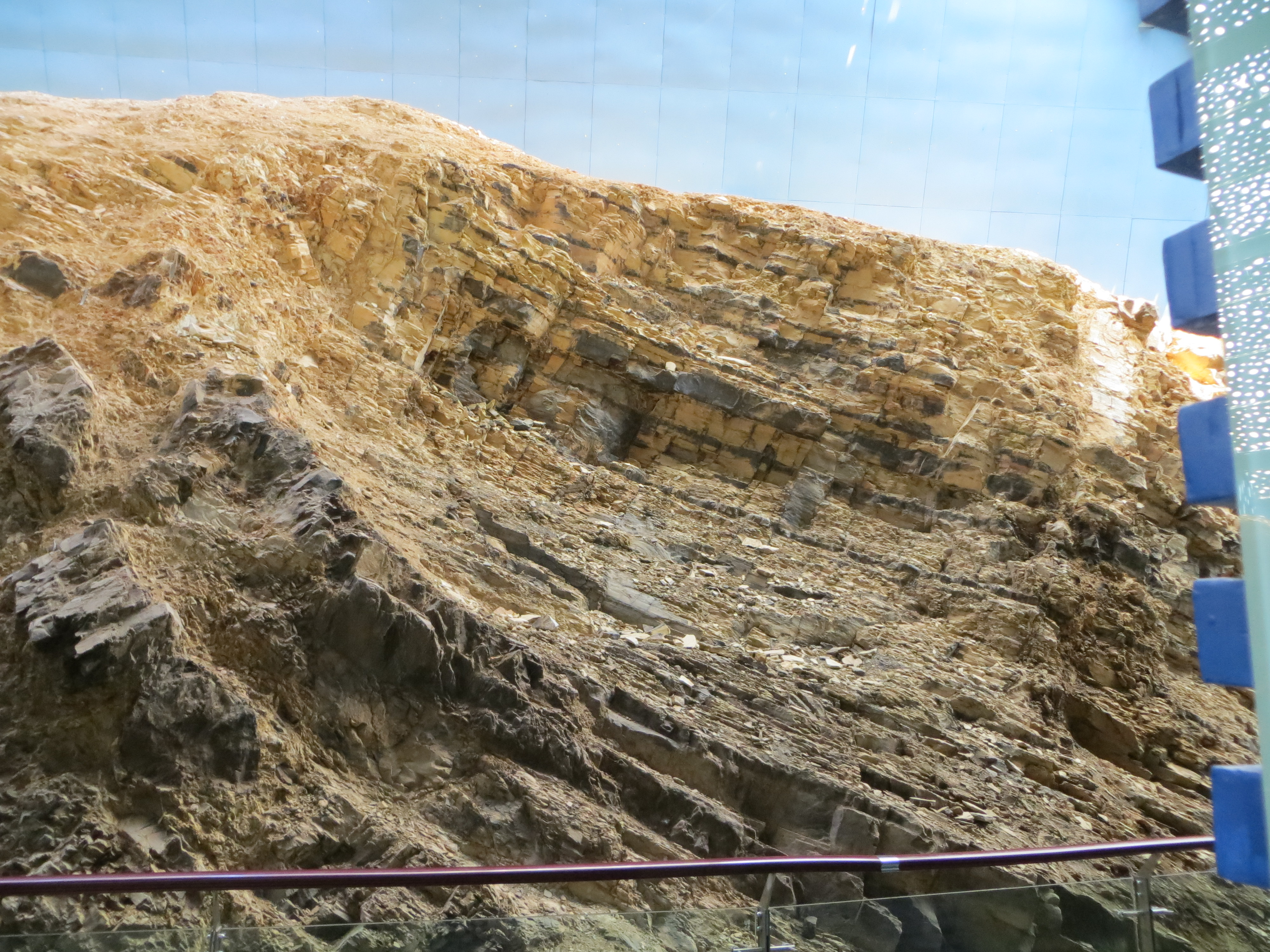
- Outcrop of the Maotianshan Shale, site of the discovery of the Chengjiang Biota
- Type: Member
- Unit of: Chiungchussu Formation
- Area: multiple 10,000 km^{2} (3,900 sq mi)
- Thickness: 50 m (160 ft)

Lithology
- Primary: Shale
- Other: Mudstone

Location
- Coordinates: 26.7°N 108.4°E
- Approximate paleocoordinates: 28.1°N 154.3°E
- Region: Chengjiang County, Yunnan
- Country: China

Type section
- Named for: Maotianshan Hill
- Location: Maotianshan Hill
- Region: Chengjiang County, Yunnan
- Country: China

The Maotianshan Shales (simplified Chinese: 帽天山页岩; traditional Chinese: 帽天山頁岩; pinyin: Màotiānshān yèyán) are a series of Early Cambrian sedimentary deposits in the Chiungchussu Formation or Heilinpu Formation, famous for their Konservat Lagerstätten, deposits known for the exceptional preservation of fossilized organisms or traces. The Maotianshan Shales form one of some 40 Cambrian fossil locations worldwide, exhibiting exquisite preservation of rarely preserved, non-mineralized soft tissue, comparable to the fossils of the Burgess Shale of British Columbia, Canada. They take their name from Maotianshan Hill (Chinese: 帽天山; pinyin: Màotiānshān; lit. 'Hat Sky Mountain') in Chengjiang County, Yunnan Province, China, and lies within the "Eoredlichia-Wutingaspis Zone" of South China. A 512-hectare (1,270-acre) site within this formation, known as the Chengjiang Fossil Site, was listed as a World Heritage Site by UNESCO in 2012.

The most famous assemblage of organisms are referred to as the Chengjiang biota for the multiple scattered fossil sites in Chengjiang. The age of the Chengjiang Lagerstätte is locally termed Qiongzhusian, a stage correlated to the late Atdabanian Stage in Siberian sequences of the middle of the Early Cambrian. The shales date to ≤518 million years ago.

Along with the Burgess Shale, the Maotianshan Shales are remarked as "our best window into the Cambrian 'explosion'", especially on the origin of chordates.

== History and scientific significance ==
Although fossils from the region have been known from the early part of the 20th century, Chengjiang was first recognized for its exquisite states of preservation with the 1984 discovery of the naraoiid Misszhouia, a soft-bodied relative of trilobites. Since then, the locality has been intensively studied by scientists throughout the world, yielding a constant flow of new discoveries and triggering an extensive scientific debate surrounding the interpretation of discoveries. Over this time, taxa have been revised or reassigned to different groups. Interpretations have led to many refinements of the phylogeny of groups and even the erection of the new phylum Vetulicolia of primitive deuterostomes.

The Chengjiang biota has all the animal groups found in the Burgess Shale; however, since it is ten million years older, it more strongly supports the deduction that metazoans diversified earlier or faster in the early Cambrian than does the Burgess Shale fauna alone. The preservation of an extremely diverse faunal assemblage renders the Maotianshan shale the world's most important for understanding the evolution of early multi-cellular life, particularly the members of phylum Chordata, which includes all vertebrates. The Chengjiang fossils comprise the oldest diverse metazoan assemblage above the Proterozoic-Phanerozoic transition and, thus, the fossil record's best data source for understanding the apparently rapid diversification of life known as the Cambrian Explosion.

One of the locations of the Chengjiang biota is the Haiyan Lagerstätte, where hundreds of juvenile specimens have been found. This unique location offers insights into the development of most animal groups and as such is a unique deposit in the Cambrian.

=== IUGS geological heritage site ===
In respect of 'the Chengjiang fossils represent[ing] an unparalleled record of the fundamentally important rapid diversification of metazoan life in the early Cambrian', the International Union of Geological Sciences (IUGS) included the 'Cambrian Chengjiang fossil site and lagerstätte' in its assemblage of 100 'geological heritage sites' around the world in a listing published in October 2022. The organisation defines an 'IUGS Geological Heritage Site' as 'a key place with geological elements and/or processes of international scientific relevance, used as a reference, and/or with a substantial contribution to the development of geological sciences through history.'

=== World Heritage Site ===
A 512-hectare (1,270-acre) site within this formation, known as the Chengjiang Fossil Site, was listed as a World Heritage Site by UNESCO in 2012.

== Preservation and taphonomy ==
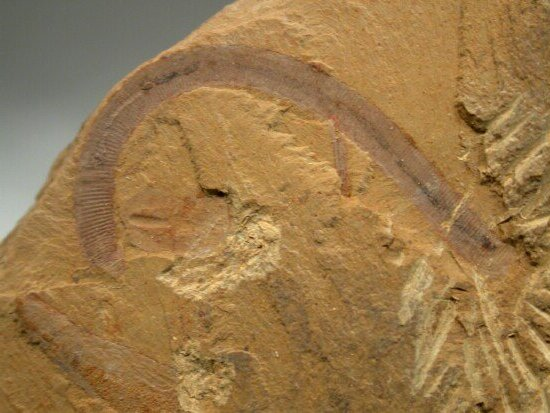
Maotianshania cylindrica, a fossil nematomorph worm, Early Cambrian, Chengjiang Maotianshan Shales

The fossils occur in a section of mudstone 50 metres (160 ft) thick in the Yuanshan Member of the Qiongzhusi Formation. The Yuanshan Member is extensive, covering multiple 10,000 square kilometres (3,900 sq mi) of eastern Yunnan Province, where there are many scattered outcrops yielding fossils. Studies of the strata are consistent with a tropical environment with sea level changes and tectonic activity. The region is believed to have been a shallow sea with a muddy bottom. The preserved fauna is primarily benthic and was likely buried by periodic turbidity currents, since most fossils do not show evidence of post-mortem transport. Like the younger Burgess Shale fossils, the paleo-environment enabled preservation of non-mineralized, soft body parts. Fossils are found in thin layers less than an inch thick. The soft parts are preserved as aluminosilicate films, often with high oxidized iron content and often exhibiting exquisite details.

The Chengjiang beds are very deeply weathered, as evidenced by their low specific gravity (i.e., they are very lightweight). Trace fossils are abundant.

== Chengjiang fauna ==
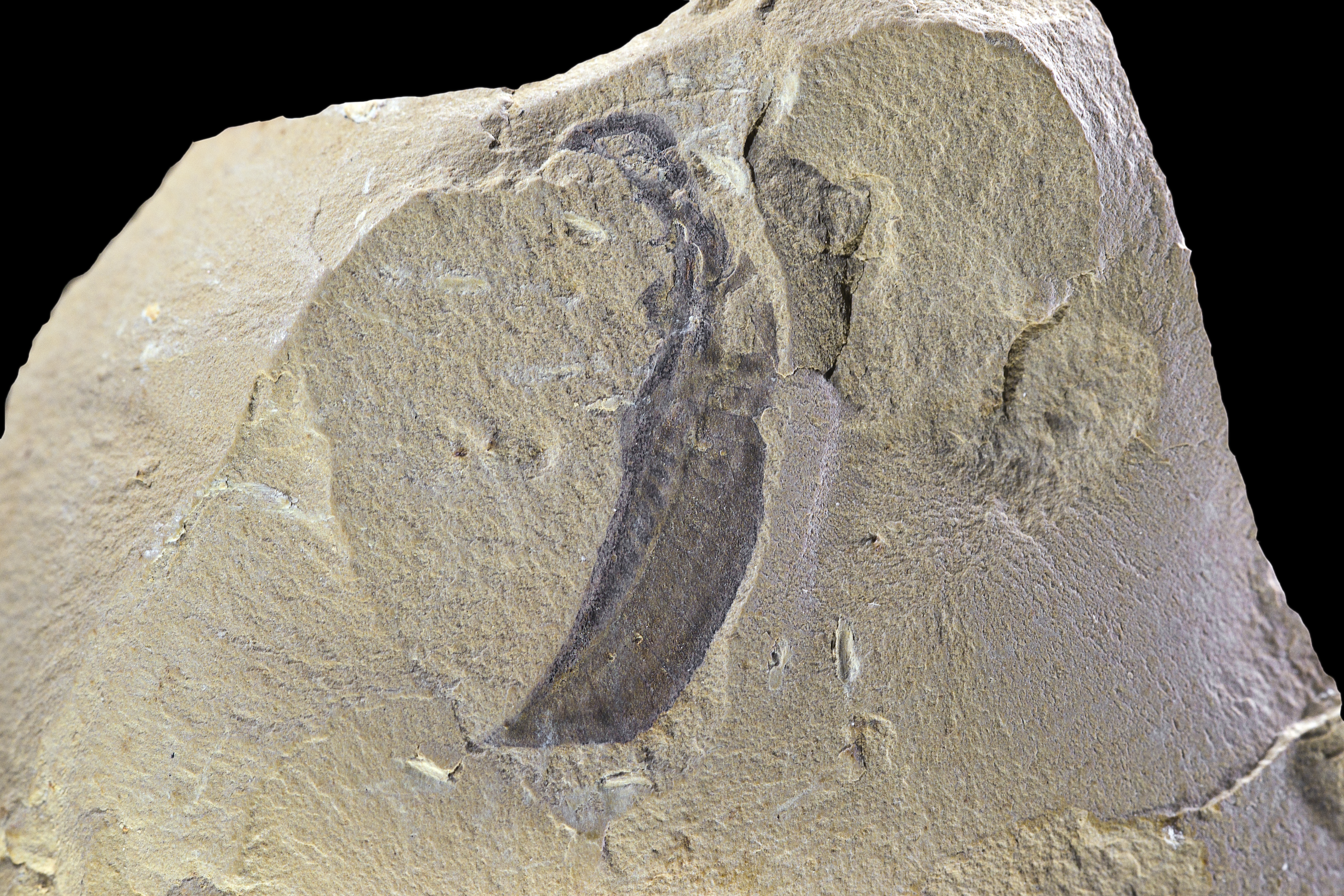
Haikouella lanceolata, Maotianshan Shales, Chengjiang County, Yunnan Province

Reconstruction of various animals of the Chengjiang Biota.

The Chengjiang biota comprises an extremely diverse faunal assembly, with some 185 species described in the literature as of June 2006. Of these, nearly half are arthropods, few of which had the hard, mineral-reinforced exoskeletons characteristic of all later arthropoda; only about 3% of the organisms known from Chengjiang have hard shells. Most of those are the trilobites (of which there are five species), all of which have been found with traces of legs, antennae, and other soft body parts, an exceedingly rare occurrence in the fossil record. Phylum Porifera (sponges; 15 species) and Priapulida (16 species) are also well represented. Other phyla represented are Brachiopoda, Chaetognatha, Cnidaria, Ctenophora, Echinodermata, Hyolitha, Nematomorpha, Phoronida, and Chordata. Possible molluscs include Wiwaxia.

About one in eight animals are problematic forms of uncertain affinity, some of which may have been evolutionary experiments that survived for only a brief period as benthic environments rapidly changed in the Cambrian. Chengjiang is the richest source of the Lobopodia, a group including many early panarthropods, with six genera represented: Luolishania, Paucipodia, Cardiodictyon, Hallucigenia (also known from the Burgess Shale), Microdictyon, and Onychodictyon.

Perhaps the most important fossils from Chengjiang are eight possible members of phylum Chordata, the phylum to which all vertebrates belong. The most famous is Myllokunmingia, possibly a very primitive agnathid (i.e., jawless fish). Similar to Myllokunmingia is Haikouichthys ercaicunensis, another primitive fish-like animal.

A wide range of affinities have been proposed for the enigmatic Yunnanozoon lividum including stem cephalochordates, stem or crown hemichordates, craniates, stem deuterostomes, stem bilaterians, or ambulacrarians. Specimens initially identified as Haikouella (a genus later deemed a junior synonym of Yunnanozoon) display has several chordate features, including a discernible heart, dorsal and ventral aorta, gill filaments, and a notochord (neural chord). A 2024 study placed Yunnanozoon along the chordate stem.

Another much-debated group is the Vetulicolia, starting with the discovery of Vetulicola in 1987. Close Chengjiang relatives of Vetulicola include Beidazoon and the Didazoonids. Heteromorphus is more closely related to Banffia from the Burgess Shale, but both it and Banffia are also considered to be vetulicolians. Originally described as crustacean arthropods, the Vetulicola were later erected as a new phylum of primitive deuterostomes by D.G. Shu. In recent years, a majority of workers have come to see the vetulicolians as stem chordates, and a 2024 study placed vetulicolians as a basal chordate evolutionary grade, followed by Yunnanozoon. An alternative proposal places vetulicolians as a sister group to tunicates. Vetulicolians are thought to have been swimmers that either were filter feeders or detritivores.

Some two dozen animals from the Chengjiang biota are problematic regarding phylogenetic assignment. Among these, 'Anomalocaris' saron, the alleged predatory terror of the early Cambrian, was the most famous, although that species is later reclassified to Houcaris saron and Innovatiocaris maotianshanensis. Shu (2006) recently described Stromatoveris psygmoglena as a possible bilateran missing link between Ediacaran fronds and Cambrian ctenophores. Cambrocornulitus had a tubicolous shell which probably was biomineralized. It shares some affinities with cornulitids and lophophorates.

The Chengjiang biota is believed to have inhabited a delta front environment rich in oxygen, with high sedimentation rates and major fluctuations in salinity being the main environmental stressors.

== Guanshan biota ==
Located in the Yunnan Province of South China and hosted in the geologically distinct Cambrian Stage 4 Wulongqing Formation, The Guanshan biota are also Burgess shale-type fossils but slightly younger than the Chengjian biota with an age dating to 515–510 Myr. Brachiopods are the most abundant species, followed by trilobites. Other species belong to sponges, chancelloriids, cnidarians, ctenophores, priapulids, lobopodians, arthropods, anomalocaridids, hyoliths, molluscs, brachiopods, echinoderms, algae and vetulicolians. There are also the earliest-known eocrinoids, unidentified soft-bodied animals and abundant trace fossils.

The Guanshan biota are regarded as successors of the Chengjian biota, and share many species. The unique species include arthropods like Guangweicaris and Astutuscaris, alongside vetulicolians like Vetulicola gantoucunensis and V. longbaoshanensis.

== Gallery ==
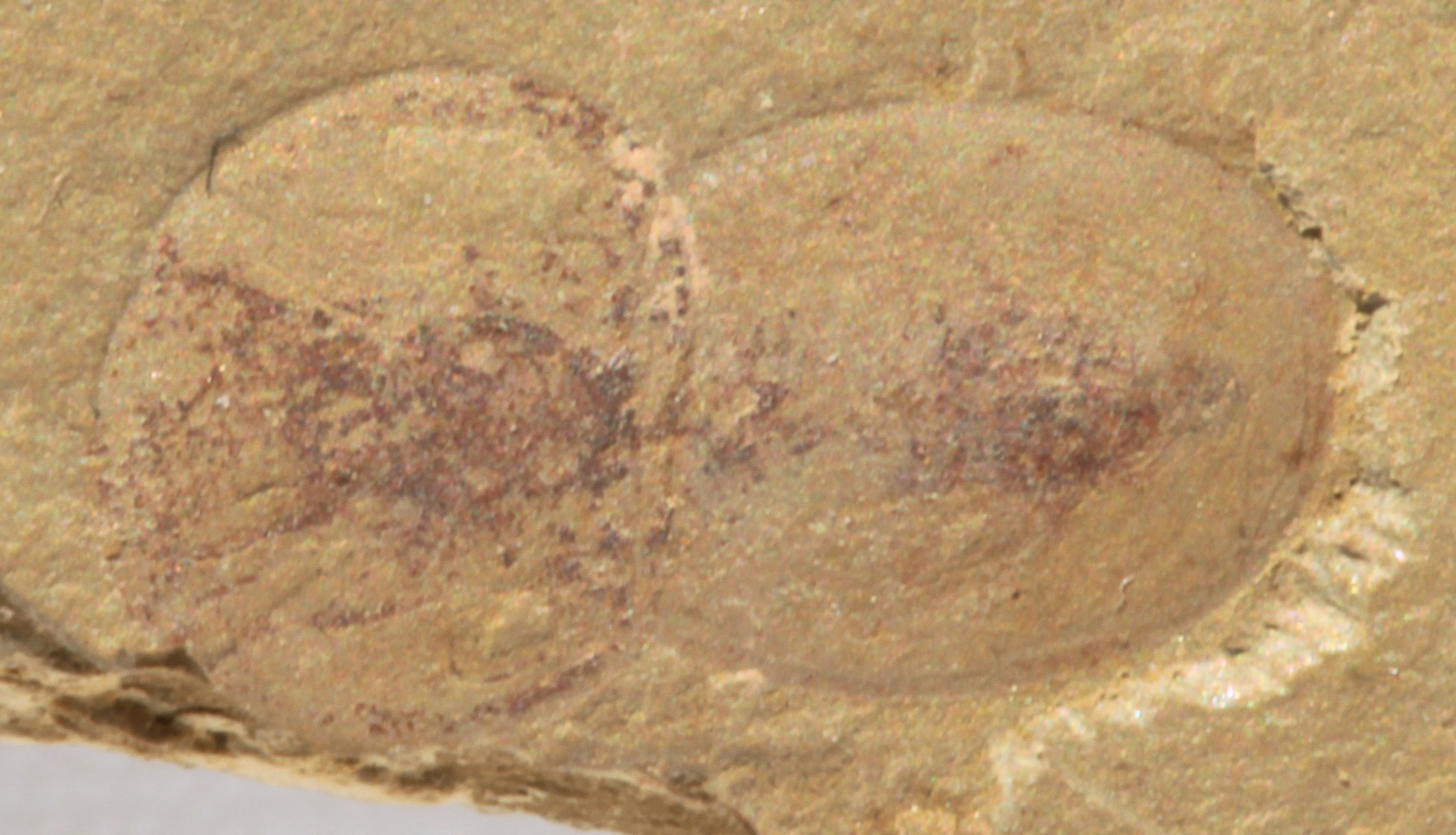
Misszhouia longicaudata

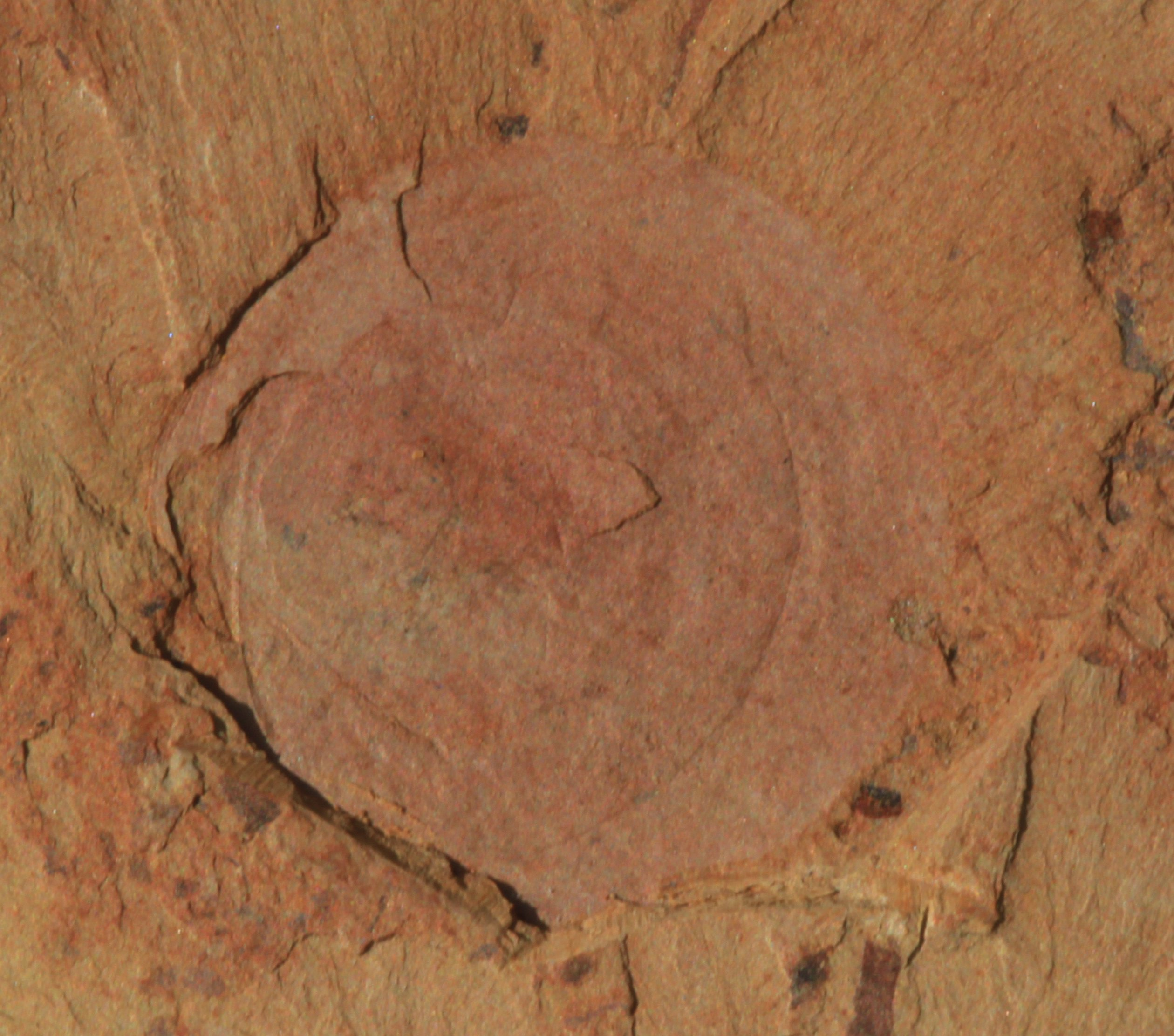
Heliomedusa orienta

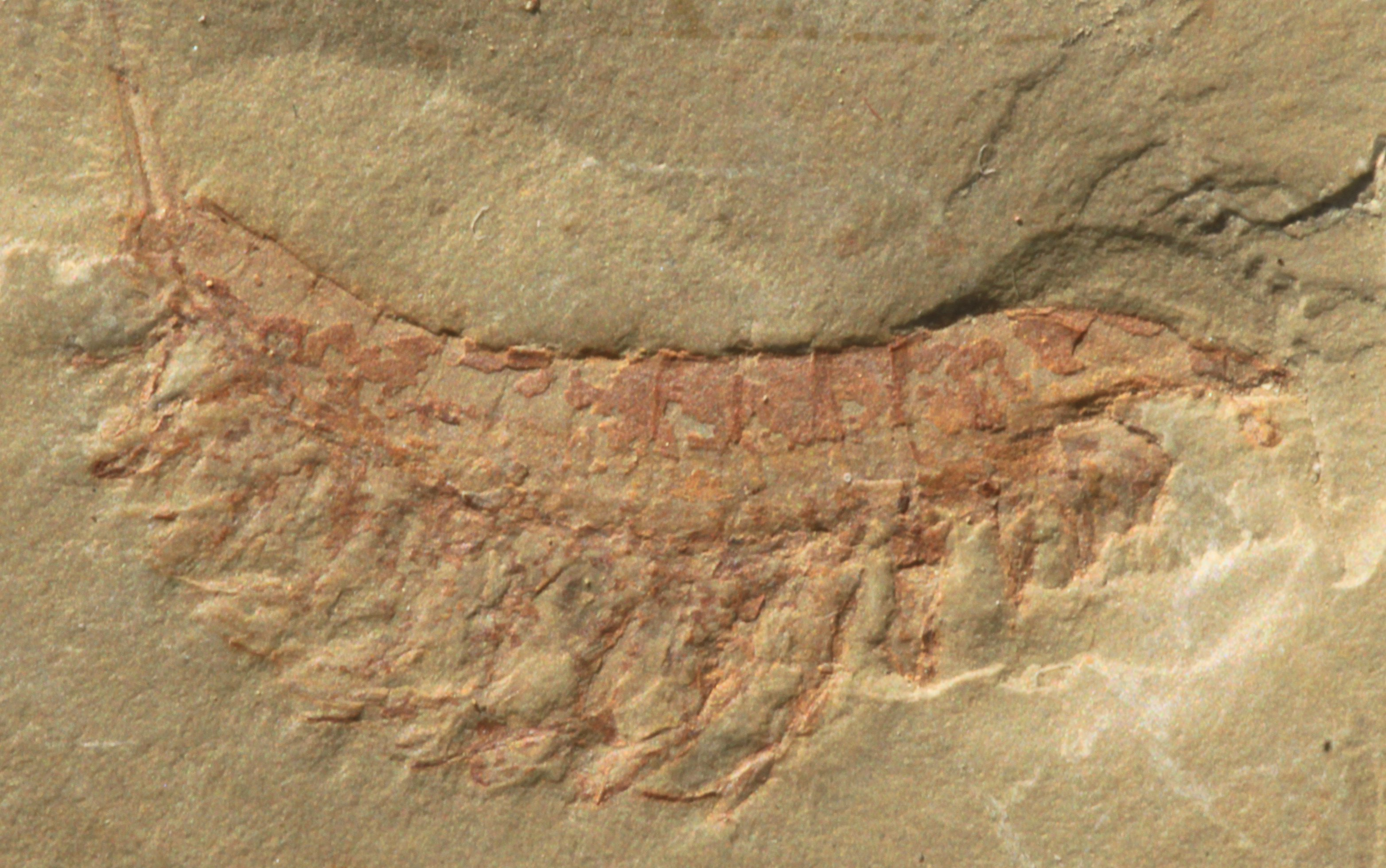
Leanchoilia illecebrosa

== See also ==
- Geography of China
- Stephen Jay Gould, Wonderful Life
- List of arthropods of the Cambrian Period
- List of Xiaoshiba Biota species
