= Zhongpingscolex =

Zhongpingscolex Temporal range: 535 Ma

Scientific classification
- Kingdom: Animalia
- Clade: Protostomia
- Superphylum: Ecdysozoa
- Clade: Scalidophora
- Genus: †Zhongpingscolex
- Species: †Z. qinensis

Binomial name
- †Zhongpingscolex qinensis Zhang & Liu, 2020

Extinct genus of Cambrian scalidophorans

Zhongpingscolex is an extinct genus of scalidophorans that lived during the Fortunian stage of the early Cambrian, around 535 million years ago. It is interpreted as a relative of mud dragons (Kinorhyncha). It has been discovered in the Kuanchuanpu Formation, China. The type and only species is Z. qinensis.

== Discovery and naming ==
The holotype (and only known specimen) was discovered in phosphatic limestone of the Kuanchuanpu Formation, in the Zhangjiagou section of Xixiang County, Shaanxi Province. This horizon has an estimated age of about 535 Ma (Fortunian, early Cambrian). The Zhangjiagou Lagerstätte is known for its exceptionally preserved microfossils such as embryos, cycloneuralians, cnidarians and Saccorhytus. The holotype of Z. qinensis is three dimensionally preserved with soft tissues thanks to phosphatization. Microfossils are extracted from the rock using acid, they are then handpicked and observed under a microscope.

The genus name is a combination if "Zhongping", in honour of Prof. Zhongping Li and the Greek word "scolex", meaning "worm". The species name means "from Qin".

== Description ==
The only known specimen is possibly a juvenile. It is a worm-like animal approximately 1.4 mm long and 390 μm wide. The length may be inaccurate due to the introvert being partially invaginated. The body is divided in two main parts, the trunk and the introvert (eversible head). The introvert bears conical hollow scalids (cuticular spines). The trunk consists of 15 annuli. Each annulus bears a circlet of 15 to 20 sclerites. This species is pretty similar to Eokinorhynchus rarus. However, Z. qinensis lacks a neck part between the introvert and the trunk.

== Classification ==
Cladogram after Shao et al., 2020:

- Ecdysozoa
  - Panarthropoda
    - Onychophora
    - - †Aysheaia
      - - †Kerygmachela
        - - Tardigrada
          - †Microdictyon
  - total-group Cycloneuralia
    - - †Laojieella
      - - †Fieldia
        - †Ancalagon
      - - - †Tylotites
          - - - Nematoidea
              - - †Palaeoscolecida sensu stricto
                - - †Cricocosmia
                  - †Tabelliscolex
          - - †Scolecofurca
            - - †Louisella
              - - †Corynetis
                - †Anningvermis
      - crown-group Scalidophora
        - total-group Kinorhyncha
          - - †Zhongpingscolex
            - †Eokinorhynchus
          - crown-group Kinorhyncha
        - - Loricifera
          - Priapulida
