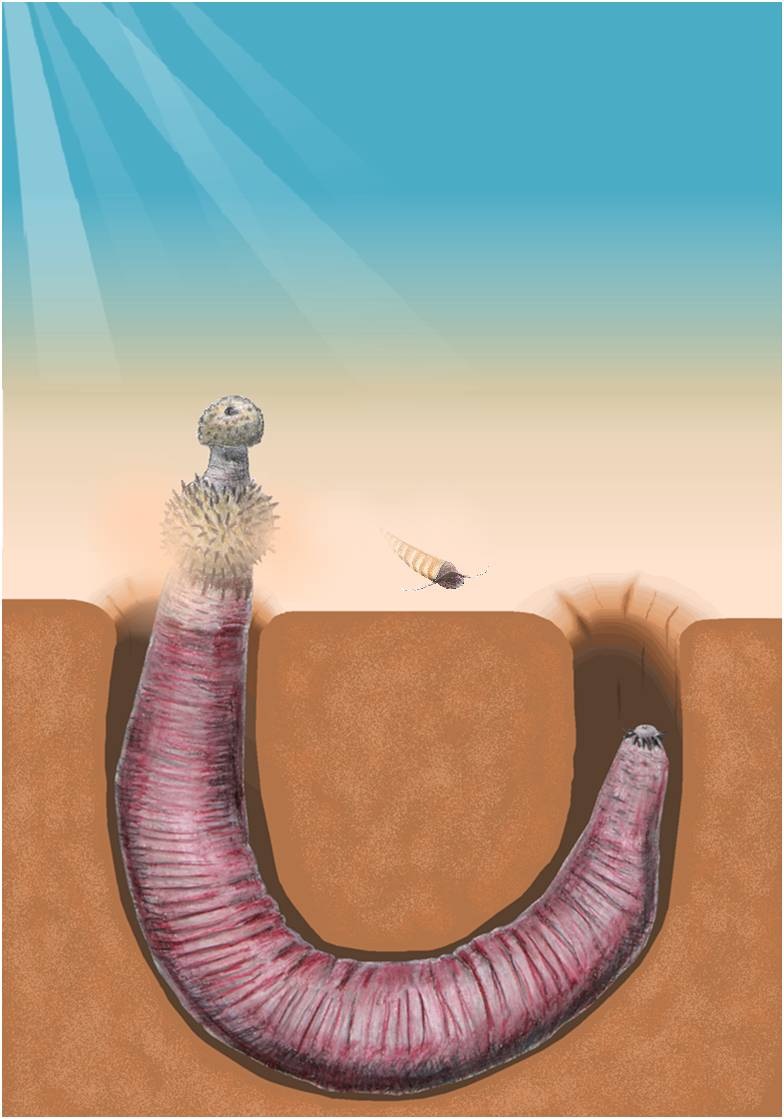
- Reconstruction of the archaeopriapulid Ottoia with a nearby Haplophrentis

Scientific classification
- Kingdom: Animalia
- Stem group: Priapulida (?)
- Class: †Archaeopriapulida

Species
- See text

= Archaeopriapulida =

Archaeopriapulida Temporal range: Cambrian Stage 3–Middle Cambrian

Class of marine worms

Archaeopriapulida is a group of priapulid worms known from Cambrian lagerstätte. The group is closely related to, and very similar to, the modern priapulids. It is unclear whether it is mono- or polyphyletic. Despite a remarkable morphological similarity to their modern cousins, they fall outside of the priapulid crown group, which is not unambiguously represented in the fossil record until the Carboniferous. In addition to well-preserved body fossils, remains of several archaeopriapulid taxa are known to have been preserved primarily as organic microfossils, such as isolated scalids and pharyngeal teeth. They are probably closely related or paraphyletic to the palaeoscolecids; the relationship between these basal worms is somewhat unresolved.

== Species ==
- Genus Acosmia Chen & Zhoi 1997 (Chengjiang deposits)
  - Acosmia maotiania Chen & Zhoi 1997
- Genus Archotuba Hou et al. 1999 (possibly a Cnidarian) (Chengjiang deposits)
  - Archotuba conoidalis Hou et al. 1999
- Genus Baltiscalida Slater et al. 2017
  - Baltiscalida njorda Slater et al. 2017
- Genus Eopriapulites Liu & al 2014
  - Eopriapulites sphinx Liu & al 2014
- Genus Eximipriapulus Ma et al. 2014 (Chengjiang deposits)
  - Eximipriapulus globocaudatus Ma et al. 2014
- Genus Lagenula Luo & Hu 1999 nomen dubium (Chengjiang deposits)
  - Lagenula striolata Luo & Hu 1999 nomen dubium
- Genus Laojieella Han et al. 2006 (Chengjiang deposits)
  - Laojieella thecata Han et al. 2006
- Genus Lecythioscopa Conway Morris 1977 (Burgess Shale)
  - Lecythioscopa simplex (Walcott 1931) Conway Morris 1977 [Canadia simplex Walcott 1931]
- Genus Oligonodus Luo & Hu 1999 nomen dubium (Chengjiang deposits)
  - Oligonodus specialis Luo & Hu 1999 nomen dubium
- Genus Sandaokania Luo & Hu 1999 nomen dubium (Chengjiang deposits)
  - Sandaokania latinodosa Luo & Hu 1999 nomen dubium
- Genus Singuuriqia Peel 2017 (Sirius Passet)
  - Singuuriqia simoni Peel 2017
- Genus Sullulika Peel & Willman, 2018
  - Sullulika broenlundi Peel & Willman, 2018
- Genus Vladipriapulus Ivantsov et al. 2005 (Sinsk Formation)
  - Vladipriapulus malakhovi Ivantsov et al. 2005
- Genus Xishania Hong 1981
  - Xishania fusiformis Hong 1981
  - Xishania jiangxiensis Hong 1988
- Genus Paratubiluchus Han, Shu, Zhang et Liu, 2004 (Chengjiang deposits)
  - Paratubiluchus bicaudatus Han, Shu, Zhang et Liu, 2004
- Genus Xiaoheiqingella Hu 2002
  - Xiaoheiqingella peculiaris Hu 2002 [Yunnanpriapulus halteroformis Huang et al. 2004] (Chengjiang deposits)
- Genus Priapulites Schram 1973 (Mazon Creek)
  - Priapulites konecniorum Schram 1973
- Family Palaeopriapulitidae Hou et al. 1999
  - Genus Sicyophorus Luo & Hu 1999 (Chengjiang deposits)
    - Sicyophorus rara Luo & Hu 1999
    - Sicyophorus sp.
  - Genus Paraselkirkia Luo & Hu 1999
    - Paraselkirkia sinica (Luo & Hu 1999) Luo & Hu 1999
- Family Selkirkiidae Conway Morris 1977 (stem Palaeoscolecida)
  - Genus Selkirkia Walcott 1911
    - Selkirkia elongata Luo & Hu 1999 (Chengjiang deposits)
    - Selkirkia columbia Walcott 1911 (Burgess Shale)
    - Selkirkia pennsylvanica Resser & Howell 1938
    - Selkirkia spencei Resser 1939
    - Selkirkia tsering Nanglu & Ortega-Hernández 2024
    - Selkirkia willoughbyi Conway Morris & Robison 1986
- Order Ancalagonida Adrianov & Malakhov 1995 (stem Scalidophora)
  - Family Ancalagonidae Conway Morris 1977
    - Genus Ancalagon (Walcott 1911) Conway Morris 1977 (Burgess Shale)
      - Ancalagon minor (Walcott 1911) Conway Morris 1977
  - Family Fieldiidae Conway Morris 1977
    - Genus Fieldia Walcott 1912 (Burgess Shale)
      - Fieldia lanceolata Walcott 1912
  - Genus Scolecofurca Conway Morris 1977 (Burgess Shale)
    - Scolecofurca rara Conway Morris 1977
  - Family Ottoiidae Walcott 1911
    - Genus Ottoia Walcott 1911
      - Ottoia cylindrica Sun & Hou 1987
      - Ottoia guizhouenis Yang, Zhao & Zhang 2016
      - Ottoia prolifica Walcott 1911 (Burgess Shale)
      - Ottoia tenuis Walcott 1911
      - Ottoia tricuspida Smith, Harvey & Butterfield 2015
  - Family Corynetidae Huang, Vannier & Chen 2004
    - Genus Corynetis Luo & Hu 1999
      - Corynetis brevis Luo & Hu 1999 [Anningvermis multispinosus Huang et al. 2004) (Chengjiang deposits)
      - Corynetis fortis Hu et al. 2012 (Chengjiang deposits)
      - Corynetis pusillus Klug 1842
  - Family Miskoiidae Walcott 1911
    - Genus Louisella Conway Morris 1977 (Burgess Shale)
      - Louisella pedunculata (Walcott 1911) Conway Morris 1977
    - Genus Miskoia Walcott 1911
      - Miskoia placida Walcott 1931
      - Miskoia preciosa Walcott 1911
