= Fieldia (worm) =

Fieldia Temporal range: Middle Cambrian

Scientific classification
- Kingdom: Animalia
- Stem group: Priapulida (?)
- Class: †Archaeopriapulida
- Family: †Fieldiidae
- Genus: †Fieldia; Walcott, 1912

Species
- Fieldia lanceolata Walcott, 1912

Extinct genus of arthropods

Fieldia (named after American businessman and financier Cyrus W. Field) is a genus of worms known from the Cambrian Burgess Shale, and assigned to the priapulids.

It was originally interpreted as an arthropod; its trunk bears a dense covering of spines, and its proboscis is small. It fed on sea-floor mud, evidenced by the frequent presence of sediments preserved in its gut. It reached 5 cm in length.

Along with the other Cambrian priapulids Ottoia, Selkirkia, Louisella, Ancalagon, Scolecofurca, and Lecythioscopa, the organism was originally classified into a clade termed the Archaeopriapulida, a stem group to the Priapulids proper. However, the morphological similarity of these organisms to their modern cousins is remarkable, especially for the Burgess Shale, and their similarity to the modern genus Maccabeus suggests that they are in the Seticoronaria stem group, and thus are true crown-group priapulids. A phylogenetic analysis does not provide a great deal of resolution to the relationships between these basal worms.

18 species of Fieldia are known from the Greater Phyllopod bed, where they comprise 0.03% of the community.
