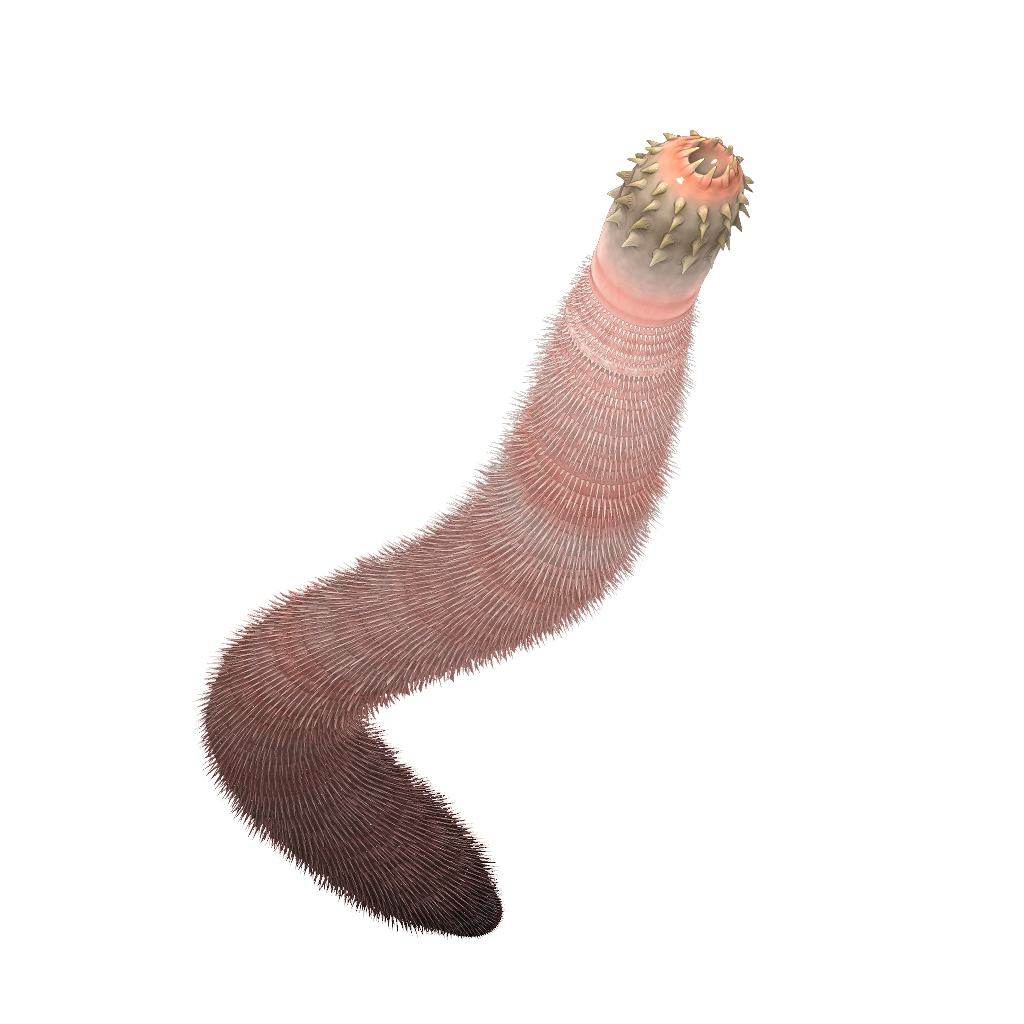
- Reconstruction of Ancalagon minor

Scientific classification
- Kingdom: Animalia
- Stem group: Priapulida (?)
- Class: †Archaeopriapulida
- Family: †Ancalagonidae; Conway Morris, 1977
- Genus: †Ancalagon; Conway Morris, 1977

Species
- †A. minor (Walcott, 1911) Conway Morris, 1977 (type)

Synonyms
- Ottoia minor Walcott 1911

= Ancalagon minor =

Ancalagon Temporal range: Mid Cambrian

Extinct species of priapulid worm

Ancalagon minor is an extinct priapulid worm known from the Cambrian Burgess Shale.

Because it superficially resembles the modern-day internal parasites known as the acanthocephalids or "spiny-headed worms," A. minor was once thought to be, or once thought to resemble the hypothetical free-living ancestor of acanthocephalids. Two specimens of Ancalagon are known from the Greater Phyllopod bed, where they comprise < 0.01% of the community.

Along with the other Cambrian worms such as Ottoia, Selkirkia, Louisella, Fieldia, Scolecofurca, and Lecythioscopa, the organism may fall into a clade termed "Archaeopriapulida," a stem group to the Priapulids proper. However, the morphological similarity of these organisms to their modern cousins is remarkable, especially for the Burgess Shale. A phylogenetic analysis does not provide a great deal of resolution to the relationships between these basal worms.

== Etymology ==
The generic name is a homage to the dragon Ancalagon of J.R.R. Tolkien's Middle-earth legendarium, in reference to the worm's prominent rows of hooks on its proboscis. The species was previously placed in the genus Ottoia, as Ottoia minor, but was removed by Simon Conway Morris, who noted morphological differences.

== Morphology ==
Ancalagon had a slender, cyndrical, radially symmetric body averaging 6 centimeters in length. Its proboscis was armed with circum-oral hooks at the anterior. There were about 10 of these hooks, equal in size and with prominent bases. Directly posterior was an unarmed space, followed by posteriorly directed spinose hooks. The trunk is annulated with 0.2 to 0.25 millimeter spacing, and carried rows of setae possibly performing sensory functions. The apparent absence of retractor muscles correlates with Ancalagon's inability to significantly invert its proboscis. The organism was probably a burrowing predator.

== See also ==
- Ankalagon, a mesonychid ungulate also named after Ancalagon the Black.
