= List of animal classes =

The following is a list of the classes in each phylum of the kingdom Animalia. There are 105 classes of animals in 24 phyla in this list (the phyla Entoprocta, Gastrotricha, Gnathostomulida, Loricifera, Micrognathozoa, Onychophora, Orthonectida and Phoronida contain no classes, nor does the subphylum Xenoturbellida). However, different sources give different numbers of classes and phyla. For example, Protura, Diplura, and Collembola are often considered to be the three orders in the class Entognatha. This list should by no means be considered complete and authoritative and should be used carefully.

== Annelida (segmented worms) ==
- Polychaeta (bristle worms, paraphyletic with respect to Clitellata and Sipuncula)
- Clitellata (earthworms, leeches)
- Sipuncula (peanut worms)

== Arthropoda (insects, crustaceans, arachnids, centipedes and others) ==
=== Chelicerata ===
- Arachnida (spiders, scorpions, and kin)
- Merostomata (horseshoe crabs)
- Pycnogonida (sea spiders)

=== Myriapoda ===
- Chilopoda (centipedes)
- Diplopoda (millipedes)
- Pauropoda
- Symphyla (pseudocentipedes)

=== Pancrustacea ===
- Ostracoda (seed shrimp)
- Mystacocarida
- Ichthyostraca (tongue worms and fish lice)
- Copepoda
- Malacostraca (crabs, lobsters, crayfish, krill, various shrimp, woodlice, and kin)
- Tantulocarida
- Thecostraca (barnacles)
- Cephalocarida (horseshoe shrimp)
- Branchiopoda (fairy shrimp, tadpole shrimp, water fleas, and clam shrimp)
- Remipedia

==== Hexapoda ====
- Entognatha (coneheads, two-pronged bristletails and springtails. paraphyletic with respect to insects)
- Insecta (insects)

== Brachiopoda (lamp shells) ==
- Lingulata
- Craniata
- Rhynchonellata

== Bryozoa (moss animals) ==
- Gymnolaemata
- Phylactolaemata
- Stenolaemata

== Chaetognatha (arrow worms) ==
- Sagittoidea

== Chordata (vertebrates, tunicates, and lancelets) ==
=== Cephalochordata ===
- Leptocardii (lancelet)

=== Tunicata ===
- Appendicularia (larvaceans)
- Ascidiacea (sea squirts, paraphyletic with respect to Thaliacea)
- Thaliacea (salps, pyrosomes, and doliolids)

=== Vertebrata ===
==== Cyclostomata (jawless fish) ====
- Myxini (hagfish)
- Petromyzontida (lamprey)

==== Gnathostomata (jawed vertebrates) ====
- Chondrichthyes (cartilaginous fish: chimeras, sharks and rays)
- Actinopterygii (ray-finned fish, which includes most familiar bony fish)
- Actinistia (coelacanths)
- Dipnoi (lungfish)
- Amphibia (amphibians)
- Mammalia (mammals)
- Aves (birds)
- Reptilia (reptiles, paraphyletic with respect to Aves)

== Cnidaria (marine stinging animals) ==
=== Anthozoa (corals and sea anemones) ===
- Octocorallia
- Hexacorallia

=== Medusozoa (jellyfish and hydrozoans) ===
- Cubozoa (box jellyfish)
- Hydrozoa (hydroids)
- Scyphozoa (true jellyfish)
- Staurozoa (stalked jellyfish)

=== Endocnidozoa (marine parasites) ===
- Myxozoa
- Polypodiozoa

== Ctenophora (comb jellies) ==
- Tentaculata
- Nuda (beroids)

== Cycliophora (tiny marine animals) ==
- Eucycliophora

== Dicyemida (rhombozoa) ==
- Rhombozoa

== Echinodermata (sea stars, sea urchins, sand dollars, sea lilies, and others) ==
=== Crinozoa ===
- Crinoidea (sea lilies and feather stars)

=== Asterozoa ===
- Asteroidea (sea star)
- Ophiuroidea (brittle stars)

=== Echinozoa ===
- Echinoidea (sea urchins)
- Holothuroidea (sea cucumbers)

== Hemichordata ==
- Enteropneusta (acorn worms)
- Pterobranchia
- Planctosphaeroidea

== Kinorhyncha (mud dragons) ==
- Allomalorhagida
- Cyclorhagida

== Mollusca (mollusks) ==
- Solenogastres
- Caudofoveata
- Bivalvia (clams, cockles, mussels, oysters and scallops)
- Cephalopoda (octopuses, squids, cuttlefish and nautiluses)
- Gastropoda (snails and slugs)
- Monoplacophora
- Polyplacophora (chitons, or sea cradles)
- Scaphopoda (tusk shells)

== Nematoda (roundworms) ==
- Chromadorea
- Enoplea

== Nematomorpha (horsehair worms) ==
- Gordioida
- Nectonematoida

== Nemertea (ribbon worms) ==
- Hoplonemertea
- Palaeonemertea
- Pilidiophora

== Placozoa ==
- Polyplacotomia
- Uniplacotomia

== Platyhelminthes (flatworms) ==
- Catenulida
- Turbellaria (e.g. Dugesia, paraphyletic with respect to Neodermata)

=== Neodermata (parasitic worms) ===
- Cestoda (tapeworms and relatives)
- Monogenea
- Trematoda (flukes)

== Porifera (sponges) ==
- Calcarea (calcareous sponges)
- Demospongiae
- Hexactinellida (glass sponges)
- Homoscleromorpha

== Priapulida (priapulid worms) ==
- Halicryptomorpha
- Priapulimorpha
- Seticoronaria

== Rotifera (rotifers) ==
- Bdelloidea
- Monogononta
- Seisonidea

=== Acanthocephala (thorny-headed worms) ===
- Archiacanthocephala
- Eoacanthocephala
- Palaeacanthocephala (ancient thornheads)
- Polyacanthocephala

== Tardigrada (tardigrades, water bears, or moss piglets) ==
- Eutardigrada
- Heterotardigrada

== Xenacoelomorpha ==
=== Acoelomorpha (simple soft-bodied flat worms) ===
- Acoela
- Nemertodermatida
