= Saccus =

Saccus may refer to:

- Saccus, Roman cognomen, see List of Roman cognomina
- Saccus, a genus of plants in the family Moraceae, synonym of Artocarpus
- Saccus, a fossil genus of ecdysozoans from the Fortunian-dated Kuanchuanpu Formation of southern Shaanxi Province, China
- Saccus, in anatomy:
  - Saccus endolymphaticus
  - Saccus lacrimalis
  - Saccus caecus caudodorsalis
  - Saccus caecus caudoventralis
  - Saccus conjunctivae
  - Saccus cranialis
  - Saccus dorsalis
- Saccus, in entomology:
  - Saccus (insect anatomy), an anatomical structure of male lepidoptera genitalia, being an anterior extension of the vinculum
