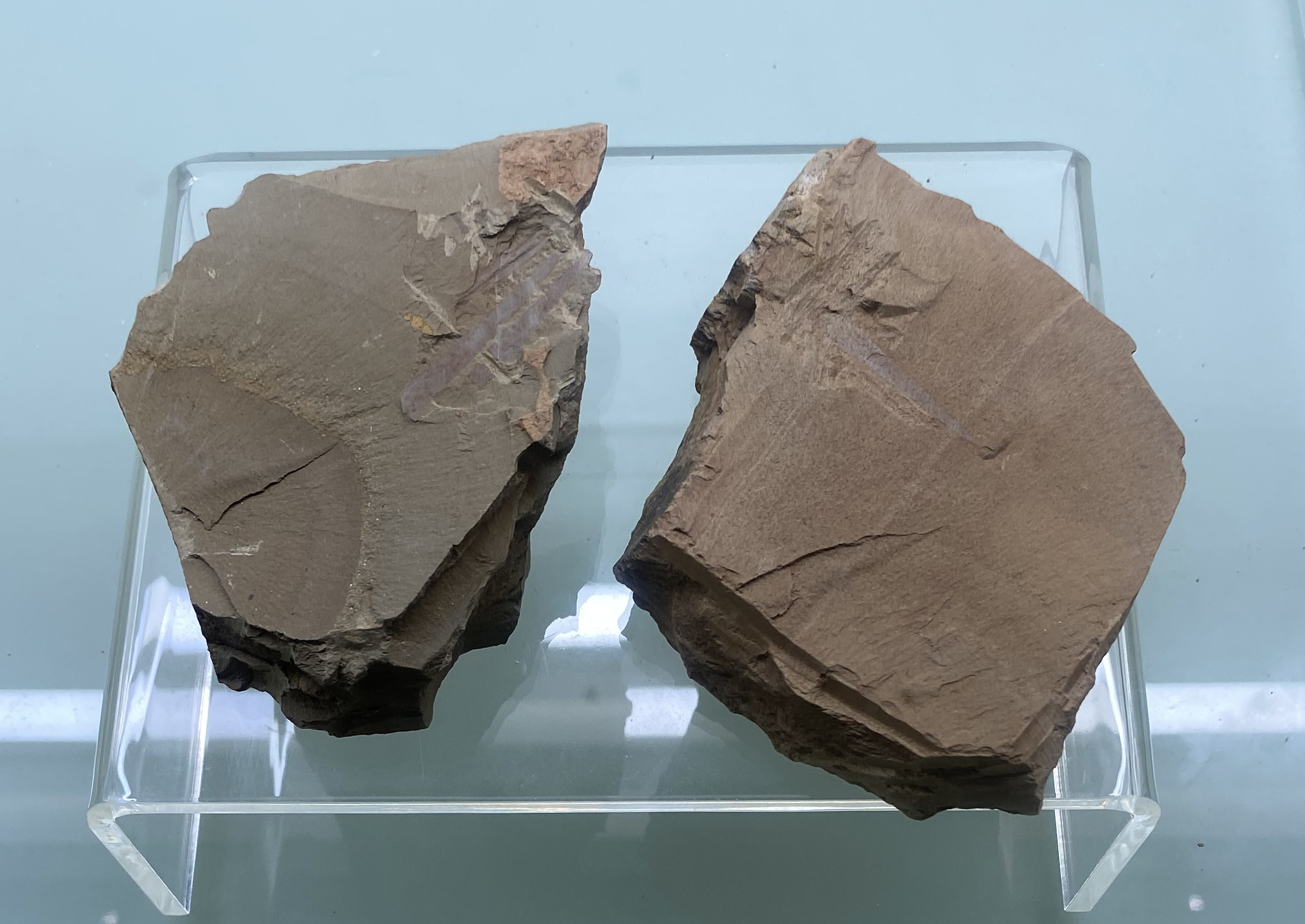
- Fossil of Archotuba conoidalis in Yuxi Museum

Scientific classification
- Kingdom: Animalia
- Phylum: incertae sedis
- Genus: †Archotuba
- Species: †A. elongata

Binomial name
- †Archotuba elongata Hou et al 1999

Synonyms
- Archotuba conoidalis

= Archotuba =

Archotuba Temporal range: 518 Ma

Genus of fossil tubes

Archotuba is a genus of elongated conical tubes that were seemingly deposited by colonial organisms. Known from the Chengjiang, its biological affinity is uncertain; it somewhat resembles the tubes of the 'priapulid' Selkirkia, but a cnidarian affinity is also possible. In the absence of soft parts, there is insufficient data to confirm a biological affiliation.

== Archotuba elongata ==
The extinct species Archotuba elongata is a debated priapulid from the Early Cambrian, discovered by Luo and Hu in 1999. Recorded only in the Chengjiang Biota of Yunnan Province, this species was initially found to be part of the phylum Priapulida, but some have raised the question that A. elongata may be related to the cnidarians. In fact, due to the lack of soft body preservation, not only does confusion remain as to the placement of A. elongata, another described species, Archotuba conoidalis, has been found to be a synonym of A. elongata.

The available specimens consist of hundreds of compressed tubes, white with some rust-colored blotches, each in shape a long cone at most 5 cm in length and 6 mm in width. The posterior is pointed, but save for a few rare annulations, the fossil is unadorned. The creature's intestine is visible along its midline, and its dark color may indicate a carnivorous nature. The habits of A. elongata are disputable: a popular explanation is that because this species is often found fixed to other creatures, and even clustered together with its own kind in similar orientations, it perhaps did not move, highly unlike the current understanding of priapulids. However, if indeed they were sedentary like the cnidarians, no tentacles have been preserved to support such a conjecture.
