= Kuanchuanpu Formation =

Geological formation in China

- Stratigraphic range: Fortunian
- Type: Geological Formation
- Underlies: Guojiaba Formation
- Overlies: Dengying Formation

Lithology
- Primary: Limestone

Location
- Region: Shaanxi
- Country: China

The Kuanchuanpu Formation, occasionally reclassified as the Kuanchuanpu Member of the Dengying Formation, is a geologic formation located in Shaanxi province in China. It is one of the earliest Cambrian formations, dating right to the Ediacaran-Cambrian boundary. This formation preserves numerous meiofauna through Orsten-type preservation.

== Paleobiota ==
=== Animals ===
Color key: Taxon / Reclassified taxon / Taxon falsely reported as present / Dubious taxon or junior synonym / Ichnotaxon / Ootaxon / Morphotaxon	Notes; Uncertain or tentative taxa are in small text; ~~crossed out~~ taxa are discredited.

Animals
Genus	Species	Higher taxon	Notes	Images
Saccorhytus	S. coronarius	Ecdysozoa	Formerly misidentified as a deuterostome, debated whether it is a scalidophoran larva or an adult ecdysozoan	Saccorhytus reconstruction
Saccus	S. necopinus, S. xixiangensis	Ecdysozoa	May resemble Saccorhytus as adults?	
Eolympia	E. pediculata	incertae sedis	At different points claimed to be a sea anemone, a ctenophore or a scalidophoran worm.	
Eopriapulites	E. sphinx	Ecdysozoa	A basal priapulid or a stem-cycloneuralian	
Dahescolex	D. kuanchuanpuensis	Scalidophora	Likely a stem-scalidophoran	
Zhongpingscolex	Z. qinensis	Kinorhyncha?	Possibly a stem-group kinorhynch	
Eokinorhynchus	E. rarus	Kinorhyncha	First described kinorhynch fossil	
Qinscolex	Q. spinosus	Scalidophora	A stem-scalidophoran	
Shanscolex	S. decorus	Scalidophora	A stem-scalidophoran	
Xinliscolex	X. intermedius	Scalidophora	A stem-scalidophoran	
Feiyanella	F. manica	Cloudinidae	Shows dichotomous branching and so likely reproduced asexually	
Sinaster	S. petalon	Cubozoa	Likely a stem-cubozoan	
Hanagyroia	H. orientalis	Medusozoa	Transitional between scyphozoans and cubozoans	
Primocyathus	P. uniseriatus	Archaeocyatha	One of the earliest known sponges, and the earliest known archaeocyath	
Sinocyathus	S. biseriatus	Archaeocyatha	One of the earliest known sponges, and the earliest known archaeocyath	
Protohertzina	P. anabarica, P. unguliformis	Protoconodonta	An early protoconodont, included in Small Shelly Fossils	
Anabarites	A. trisulcatus, A. rotundus	Anabaritidae	Enigmatic small shelly fossil, may be related to olivooids	
Conotheca	C. subcurvata	Orthothecida	One of the earliest hyolith fossils known	
Siphogonuchites	S. mirus, S. triangularis	Siphogonuchitida	Sclerite of a possible early mollusc?	
Lopochites	L. quadrigonus, L. latizonalis	Siphogonuchitida	Sclerite of a possible early mollusc?	
Maikhanella	M. multa	Halkieriida?	Cap-like shell, possibly of an early mollusc?	
Carinachites	C. spinatus, C. platus	Conulatae	Cnidarian sclerite, related to the conulariids	
Acanthocassis	A. orthacanthus	incertae sedis	May be cuticular ornaments?	
Xinlispina	X. spinosa	incertae sedis	May be cuticular ornaments?	
Cambrothyra	C. truncata	"Coeloscleritophora"	Resembles chancelloriid sclerites	
Hexaconularia	H. sp	Conulariida?	An SSF allied with conulariids	
Punctatus	P. emeiensis	Eumetazoa	A well-studied fossil from Kuanchuanpu, may not be a cnidarian?	
Olivooides	O. multisulcatus	Olivooidae	Possibly a cnidarian, but may be a cycloneuralian instead	
Quadrapyrgites	Q. quadratacris	Olivooidae?	Related to Olivooides and Punctatus, likely a scyphozoan	
Octapyrgites	O. elongatus	Olivooidae	A very large olivooid	
Qinscyphus	Q. necopinus	Scyphozoa	Underwent direct development	
Eolarva	E. kuanchuanpuensis	Cnidaria?	Originally described as a cnidarian larva, but reassigned to Ecdysozoa	
Pseudooides	P. prima	Cnidaria	Originally thought to be a scalidophoran larva	
Decimoconularia	D. anisfacialis	Hexangulaconulariidae	Formerly assigned to Hexaconularia	
Indeterminate limbed forms	Unapplicable	Bilateria	Possibly lobopodians or annelids, preserved unusually through microbial colonisation	
Emeiconularia	E. amplicanalis	Hexangulaconulariidae		

=== Microbes and Algae ===
Microbes and Algae
Genus	Species	Higher taxon	Notes	Images
Calathophycus	C. irregulatus	Diaphoretickes incertae sedis	Indeterminate cup-shaped alga, may be a fragment of a Dictyosphaeria-like form?	
Myxococcoides	M. sp	Cyanobacteria	Mat-forming coccoid cyanobacterium	
Gloeodiniopsis	G. lamellose	Chroococcaceae	Coccoid cyanobacterium	
Siphonophycus	S. solidum, S. typicum, S. cf. septatum	Oscillatoriales	Filamentous cyanobacterium	Line drawing reconstruction of Siphonophycus attenuatum
Endoconchia?	?E. sp	incertae sedis	Filaments growing on the inside of shelled fauna	
Palaeosiphonella	P. sp	Cyanobacteria	Filamentous cyanobacterium	
Megathrix	M. longus	Oscillatoriaceae	Filamentous cyanobacterium	
Girvanella	G. problematica, G. wetheredii	Oscillatoriaceae	Filamentous cyanobacteria, formed small irregular mats	
Cambricodium	C. capilloides	Rivulariaceae	Large filamentous cyanobacterium with a holdfast	
Archaeooides	A. granulatus	Diaphoretickes	Formerly thought to be an animal egg	
Shaanisphaera	S. spinosa	Diaphoretickes	Separated out from Archaeooides	
Qinlingisphaera	Q. conica	Diaphoretickes	Separated out from Archaeooides	
Dahisphaera	D. plana	Diaphoretickes	Separated out from Archaeooides	
Concavaesphaera	C. ornata	Eukaryota incertae sedis	Multicellular acritarch, likely an independent evolution of multicellularity	
