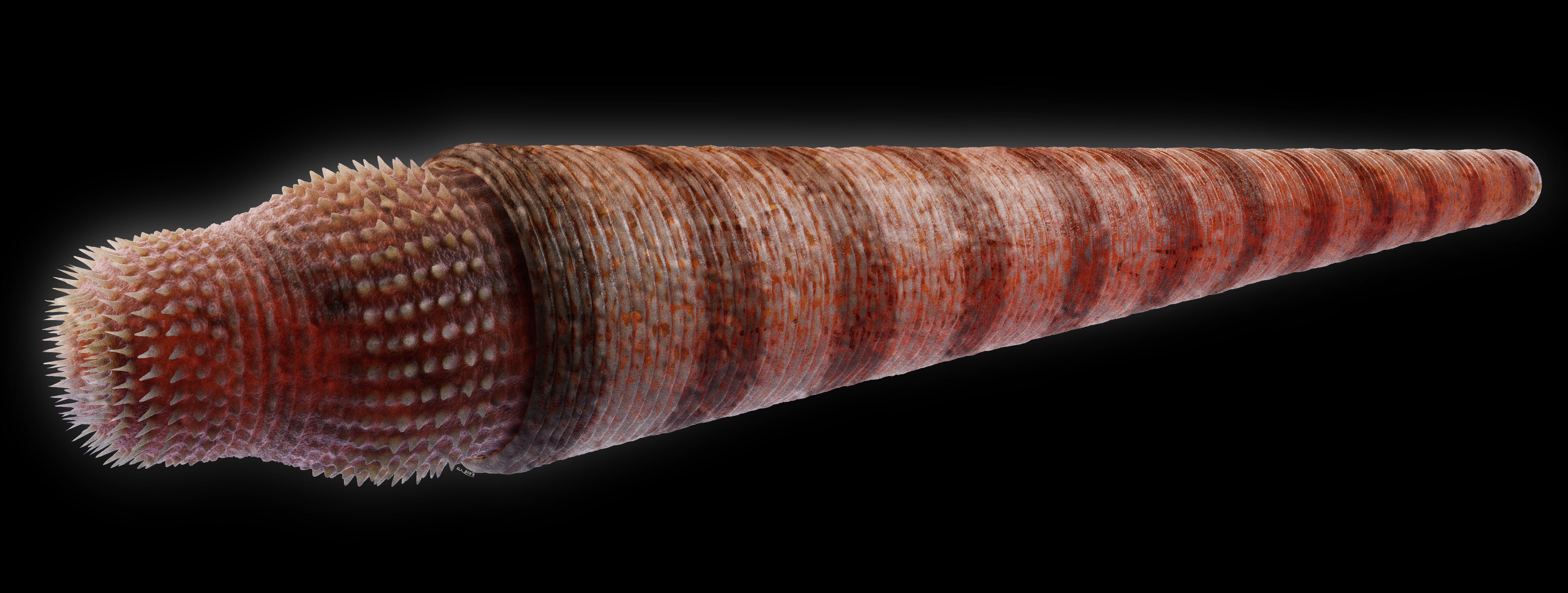
- Reconstruction

Scientific classification
- Kingdom: Animalia
- Class: Archaeopriapulida
- Genus: Paraselkirkia (Luo & Hu 1999) Hou et al. 1999

Binomial name
- Paraselkirkia jinningensis (Luo & Hu 1999) Hou et al. 1999

Synonyms
- Selkirkia sinica Luo & Hu 1999; Paraselkirkia sinica (Luo & Hu 1999)

= Paraselkirkia =

Paraselkirkia Temporal range: Chengjiang

Genus of priapulid worms

Paraselkirkia is a genus of archaeopriapulid known from the Chengjiang biota, resembling Selkirkia.
