= Polythyridium =

Gut component in priapulids

The polythyridium is a component of the gut that surrounds the entrance of the intestine in priapulids of genus Tubiluchus. It comprises tuberculate and hairy plates associated with a strong muscle. These plates may help to keep unwanted particles out of the gut.
