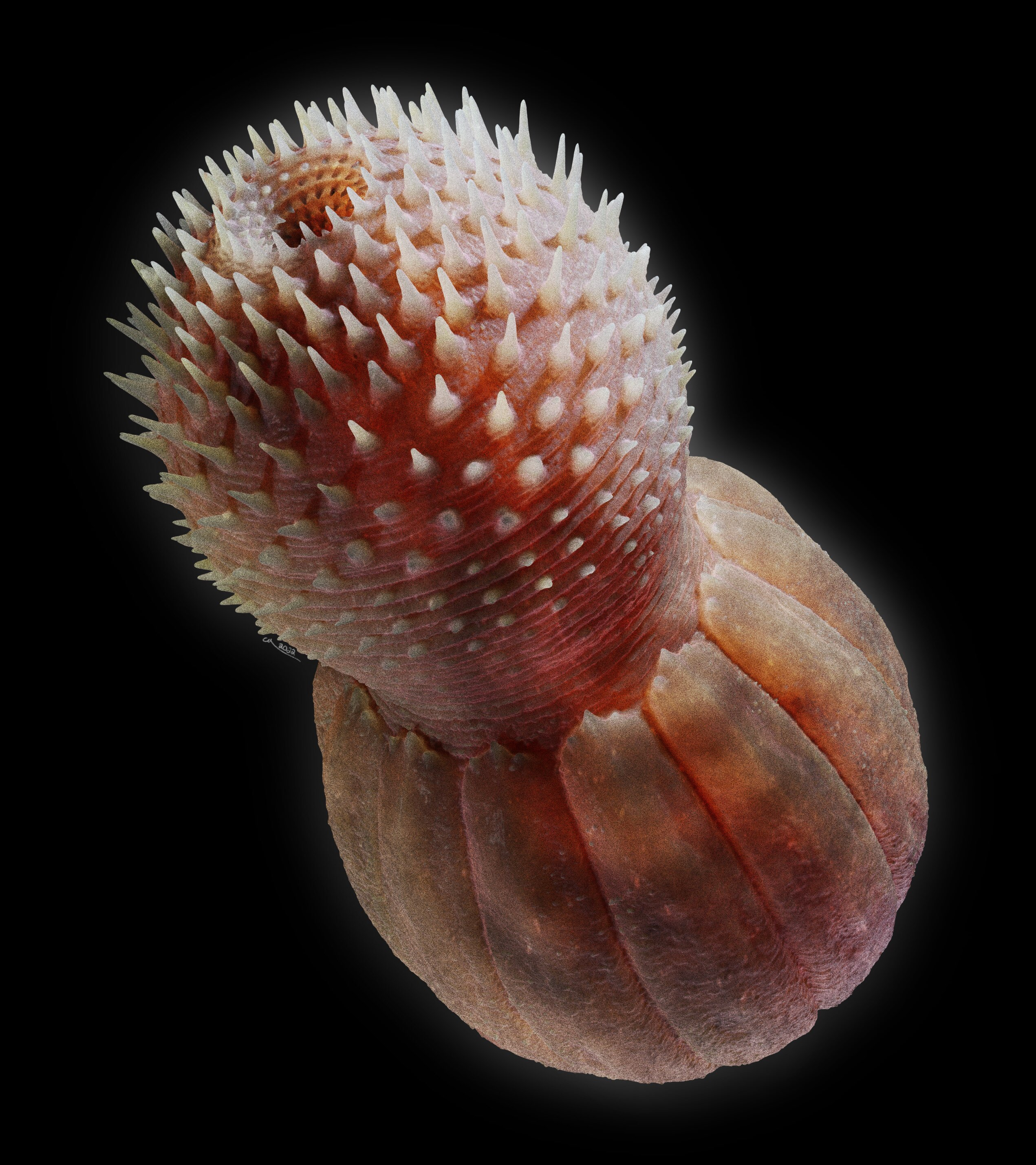
- Reconstruction

Scientific classification
- Kingdom: Animalia
- Stem group: Priapulida (?)
- Class: †Archaeopriapulida
- Genus: †Sicyophorus
- Species: †S. rara

Binomial name
- †Sicyophorus rara Luo & Hu 1999

Synonyms
- Genus; Palaeopriapulites Hou & al 1999; Protopriapulites Hou et al. 1999; Species; Palaeopriapulites parvus Hou & al 1999; Protopriapulites haikouensis Hou et al. 1999

= Sicyophorus =

Sicyophorus Temporal range: Chengjiang

Genus of priapulid worms

Sicyophorus is a genus of archaeopriapulid known from the Chengjiang biota; synonymous with Protopriapulites haikouensis.
