= Qinscolex =

Qinscolex Temporal range: Early Cambrian, 535 Ma

Scientific classification
- Kingdom: Animalia
- Superphylum: Ecdysozoa
- Clade: Scalidophora
- Genus: †Qinscolex; Liu et al. 2019
- Species: †Q. spinosus

Binomial name
- †Qinscolex spinosus Liu et al. 2019

Genus of Stem-Scalidophoran from Southern China

Qinscolex spinosus (/ɒɪŋʃkɔːlɛx/) is an extinct monotypic genus of armored stem-group scalidophoran from the early-Cambrian aged Kuanchuanpu Formation of South China.

== Etymology ==
Qinscolex derives its genus name from "Qin" the ancient name of the Shaanxi province where it was found, and σκώληξ is the Greek word for "worm", the species name spinosus is Latin for spinose which refers to elements found on the trunk of Qinscolex.

== Description ==
Qinscolex is a worm-like animal known from the fragmentary remains of a juvenile or subadult specimen that measures 1.8 mm long and 1.13 mm wide. The cuticle of Qinscolex was flexible, resulting in deformed fragments after fossilization.

=== Proboscis ===
The proboscis is composed of an introvert with the capability to fully invert itself into the trunk, 100 hollow spine-shaped scalids are present on the introvert and are densely packed in irregular arrangements.

Scalids vary in size from the shortest 100 μm long and 40 μm wide at the scalid's base to 400 μm long at the introvert's anterior. Since the holotype was found with its proboscis inverted it is unknown if a pharynx and a set of pharyngeal teeth were present on the anterior are of the proboscis.

=== Trunk ===
There is a clearly defined boundary between the trunk and proboscis due to the expanded base of the spinose sclerites providing enough differentiation from scalids on the proboscis. Sclerites are confined to 10 annuli with 40-50 spinose sclerites being present on a given annulus as well as an unusually large sclerite between the sixth and seventh annulus that measures 340 μm long and 300 μm wide.

The size of a given sclerite and the annulus it resides on vary, following a trend of increasing in length from the first to tenth annulus with the sclerites getting wider as well as longer. The smallest sclerites are measured at 35 μm long and 29 μm wide, while sclerites found on the 8th and 9th annuli are 150 μm long and 60 μm wide. The ninth annulus measures approximately 160 μm in length while the first annulus is 34 μm long, annuli after the tenth are unknown due to the posterior trunk not being known.

== Classification ==
Qinscolex is an enigmatic taxon due to the holotype's fragmentary nature, resulting in a tentative assignment to total-group Scalidophora due to the presence of sclerites indicating that Qinscolex is more derived from the cylconeuralian common ancestor than nematoids. The derived position of Qinscolex creates an evolutionary grade within Scalidophora without living descendants, requiring it to be placed on the group's stem.

== Distribution ==
Qinscolex is only known from the holotype which was recovered from Fortunian rocks found in the Kuanchuanpu Formation.
