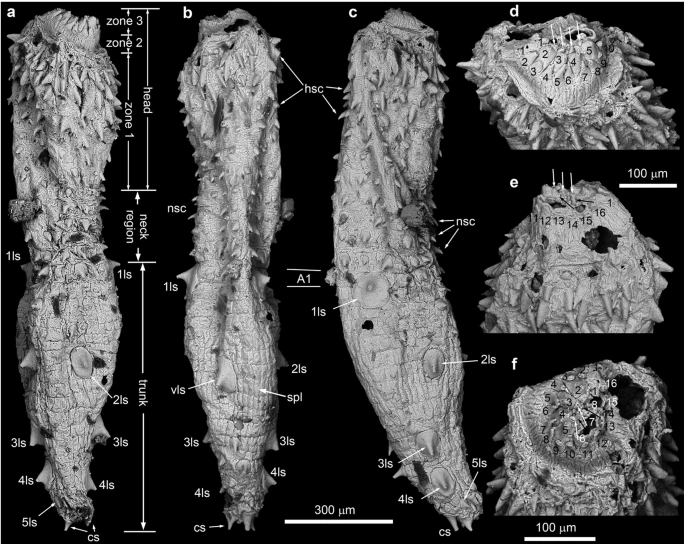
- Holotype of Eokinorhynchus
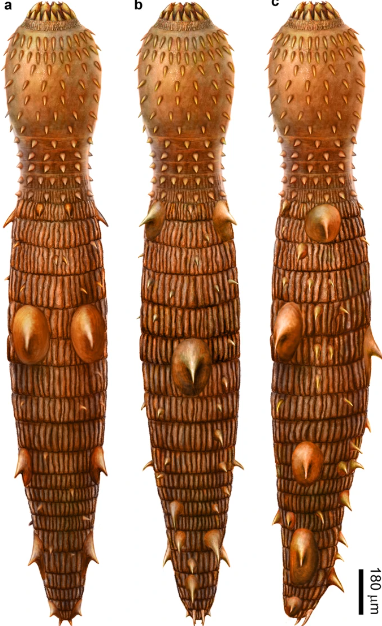
- Reconstruction of Eokinorhynchus

Scientific classification
- Kingdom: Animalia
- Clade: Scalidophora
- Stem group: Kinorhyncha
- Genus: †Eokinorhynchus
- Species: †E. rarus

Binomial name
- †Eokinorhynchus rarus Zhang et al 2015

= Eokinorhynchus =

Eokinorhynchus Temporal range: Cambrian, 535 Ma

Extinct genus of stem-group kinorhynchs

Eokinorhynchus is an extinct genus of mud dragons (Kinorhynchs) that lived around 535 million years ago in the Zhangjiagou Lagerstätte of Southern China during the earliest Cambrian period in the Fortunian stage. This genus is known from three fossils which makes up one species, Eokinorhynchus rarus, and two unnamed but related forms.

The genus Eokinorhynchus means “dawn kinorhynchs” with Eo meaning “dawn”. “Rarus” is Latin for rare.

It has an introvert with pentaradially arranged hollow scalids. The trunk of Eokinorhynchus has at least 20 annuli that are each consisting of many small rectangular plates. They are armored with five pairs of large and bilaterally placed sclerites. The annuli of its trunk is similar to the epidermis segments of other kinorhynchs.

== Taxonomy ==
Eokinorhynchus has been interpreted as a stem-group member of Kinorhyncha (mud dragons). Kinorhynchs are a member of the ecdysozoan group Scalidophora which is a group that includes priapulid worms (Priapulida) and corset animals (Loricifera). If this interpretation is proven true, it would make Eokinorhynchus by far the earliest and indeed only reported member of this group from the fossil record.
