= Acanthopriapulus =

Scientific classification
- Domain: Eukaryota
- Kingdom: Animalia
- Phylum: Priapulida
- Class: Priapulimorpha
- Order: Priapulimorphida
- Family: Priapulidae
- Genus: Acanthopriapulus; Land, 1970

Genus of priapulid worms

Acanthopriapulus is a genus of priapulids belonging to the family Priapulidae.

Species:

- Acanthopriapulus horridus (Théel, 1911)
