= Meiopriapulus =

Scientific classification
- Domain: Eukaryota
- Kingdom: Animalia
- Phylum: Priapulida
- Class: Priapulimorpha
- Order: Priapulimorphida
- Family: Tubiluchidae
- Genus: Meiopriapulus; Morse, 1981

Genus of marine worms

Meiopriapulus is a genus of worms belonging to the family Tubiluchidae.

The species of this genus are found in Southeastern Asia.

Species:

- Meiopriapulus fijiensis Morse, 1981
