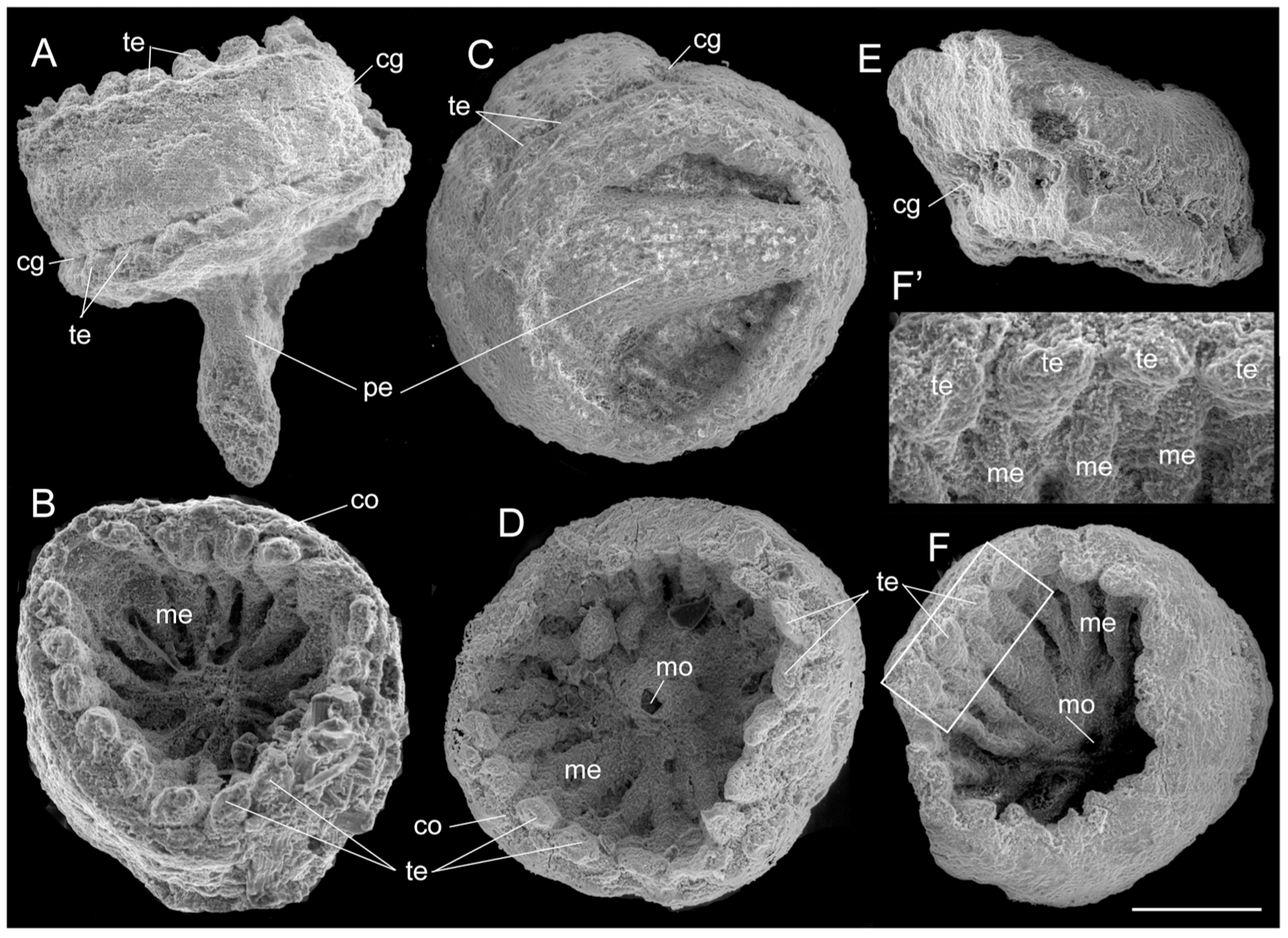

Scientific classification
- Kingdom: Animalia
- Phylum: incertae sedis
- Genus: †Eolympia
- Species: †E. pediculata

Binomial name
- †Eolympia pediculata Han et al., 2010

= Eolympia =

Eolympia Temporal range: Fortunian

Extinct genus of sea anemones

Eolympia (meaning "dawn (Greek word 'eos') + Olympic games") is interpreted as an extinct monospecific genus of sea anemone or dinomischid ctenophore which existed in what is now Ningqiang, Shaanxi Province, China during the lower Cambrian period (Fortunian Stage of the Terreneuvian Series - the lower unit of the Lower Cambrian). Its fossils have been recovered from the Kuanchuanpu Formation. The pedicle (after which E. pediculata is named) is long, suggesting the animal engaged in sexual intercourse, though marked perforations imply that reproduction by transverse fission was also quite likely as a more primitive backup.

The fossil may alternatively represent a scalidophoran worm.
