= Tubiluchidae =

Scientific classification
- Kingdom: Animalia
- Phylum: Priapulida
- Class: Priapulimorpha
- Order: Priapulimorphida
- Family: Tubiluchidae

Genera
- Meiopriapulus; Tubiluchus; †Paratubiluchus

Family of priapulid worms

Tubiluchidae is one of the two families of priapulimorphidan priapulid worms.

== Anatomy ==
The Polythyridium is a gut component. Members of the group also have a neck region both as larvae and as adults.

== Taxa ==
The family includes only the genus Tubiluchus van der Land 1968, and in some classifications Meiopriapulus. A full list of the included species:

- Tubilucus van der Land, 1968
  - T. arcticus Adrianov, Malakhov, Tchesunov & Tzetlin, 1989
  - T. australensis Van der Land 1985
  - T. corallicola van der Land, 1968
  - T. pardosi Schmidt-Rhaesa, Panpeng & Yamasaki 2017
  - T. philippinensis van der Land, 1985
  - T. remanei van der Land, 1982
  - T. soyoae Schmidt-Rhaesa, Panpeng & Yamasaki 2017
  - T. troglodytes Todaro & Shirley, 2003
  - T. vanuatensis Adrianov & Malakhov, 1991
- Meiopriapulus
  - M. fijiensis
