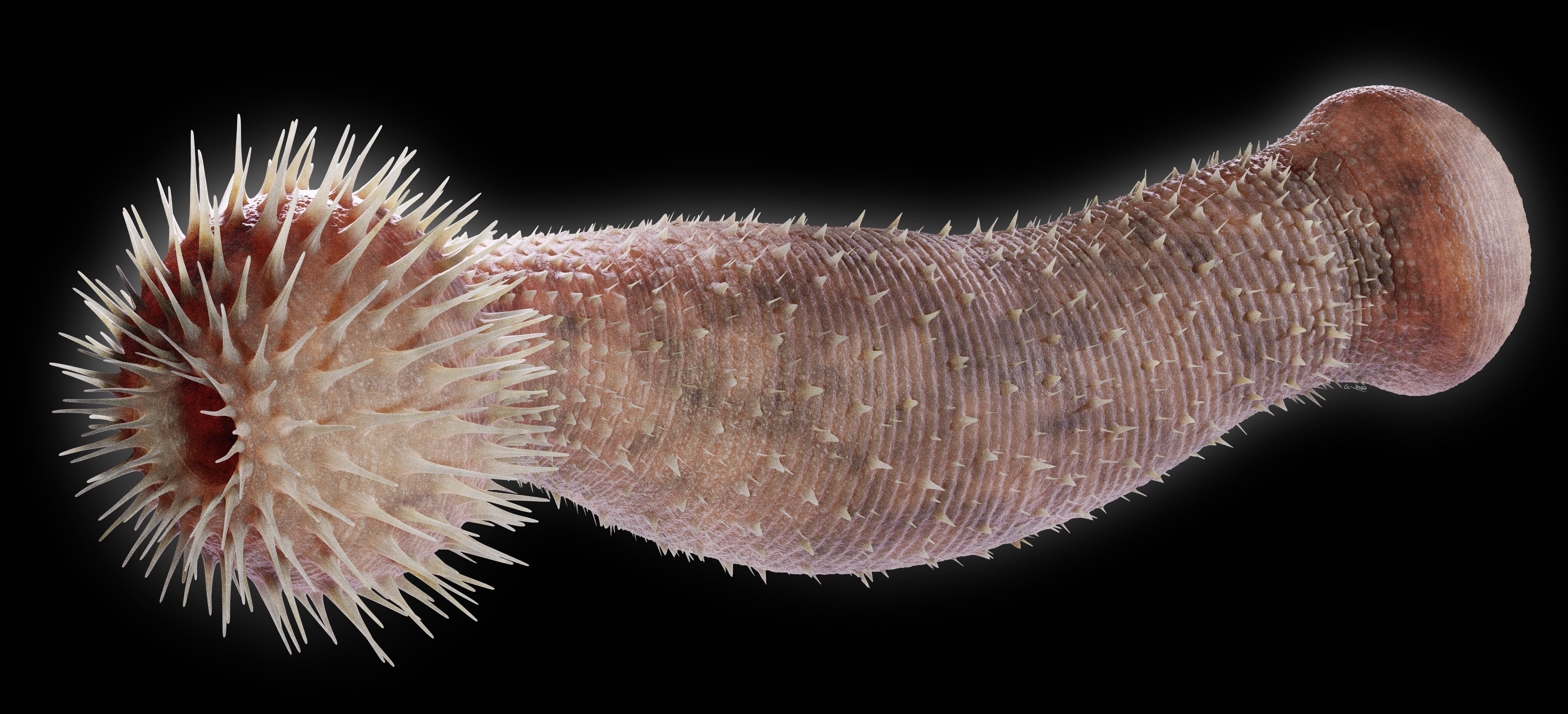
- Reconstruction

Scientific classification
- Kingdom: Animalia
- Phylum: Priapulida
- Class: incertae sedis
- Genus: †Eximipriapulus
- Species: †E. globocaudatus

Binomial name
- †Eximipriapulus globocaudatus Ma et al 2014

= Eximipriapulus =

Eximipriapulus Temporal range: Cambrian

Genus of priapulid worms

Eximipriapulus is a genus of priapulid-like organisms, perhaps belonging to the crown group, known from the Chengjiang biota.

== Paleoecology ==
Eximipriapulus is known to have lived inside Hyolith shells. It was also an active, carnivorous burrower.
