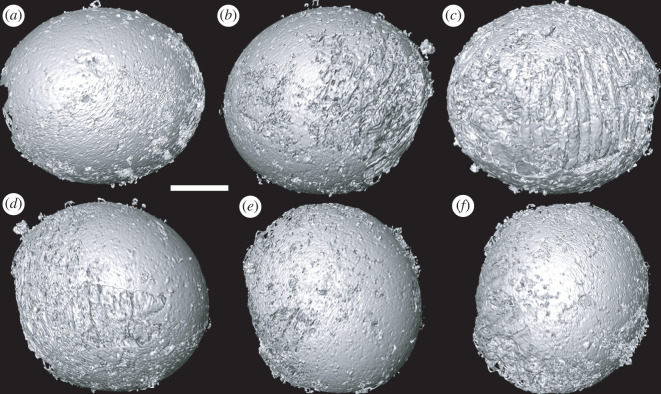

Scientific classification
- Kingdom: Animalia
- Total group: Scalidophora
- Genus: †Markuelia; Val’kov, 1983

Type species
- †Markuelia secunda Val’kov, 1984

Other species
- †M. hunanensis Dong and Donoghue, 2004; †M. lauriei Haug et al., 2009; †M. spinulifera Dong et al., 2010; †M. waloszeki Dong et al., 2010

= Markuelia =

Markuelia Temporal range: Early Cambrian–Early Ordovician

Extinct genus of worms

Markuelia is a genus of fossil worm-like bilaterian animals allied to Ecdysozoa and known from strata of Lower Cambrian to Lower Ordovician age containing five species.

An advanced X-ray imaging technique called X-ray tomographic microscopy has been applied to splendidly preserved, uncrushed Markuelia fossils found in Hunan province in southern China and in eastern Siberia. When details in features smaller than one micrometre across can be observed, these fossils are seen to represent many developmental stages, from the first cell divisions to the time of hatching; therefore they offer a unique opportunity to study the development of Lower Cambrian animals.

The features observed indicate that the genus had a mouth surrounded by a ring of teeth, an alimentary canal, and an anus.

However the characters preserved are inconclusive regarding the genus' taxonomic affinity; it can at best be placed in the scalidophoran total group, since it is currently impossible to ally it with the priapulids or other members of the Scalidophora.
