= Eopriapulites =

Eopriapulites Temporal range: Early Cambrian

Scientific classification
- Kingdom: Animalia
- Genus: †Eopriapulites
- Species: †E. sphinx

Binomial name
- †Eopriapulites sphinx Liu et al 2014

Extinct genus of priapulid worms

Eopriapulites is an early taxon in the priapulid total group, known from orsten-type material at the Kuanchuanpu Formation of China.
