= Spinosoma reticulatus =

Spinosoma Temporal range: Fortunian
- A reconstruction of Spinosoma reticulatus.

Scientific classification
- Kingdom: Animalia
- Superphylum: Ecdysozoa
- (unranked): Scalidophora (?)
- Genus: Spinosoma Zhang et al., 2026
- Species: S. reticulatus

Binomial name
- Spinosoma reticulatus Zhang et al., 2026

Extinct species of animal

Spinosoma reticulatus is an extinct species of ecdysozoan, possibly a scalidophoran, from the Fortunian of China. It is the only known species in the genus Spinosoma. Spinosoma is one of the earliest known Cambrian ecdysozoan fossils.

== Discovery and naming ==
S. reticulatus was named based on specimens discovered in Fortunian cherts in China; specifically, from the Liuchapo Formation of South China and the Yurtus Formation of Tarim. The holotype, YT231001, is from the Liuchapo Formation and preserves much of the animal. Other specimens preserving isolated fragments of cuticle are also known.

The generic name refers to the cuticle's spines, while the specific name is derived from the Latin reticulum, meaning "net-like structure".

== Description ==
S. reticulatus is an elongated, worm-like animal, with a preserved length of 1482 μm long in the holotype (but that specimen is not completely preserved towards the posterior, so the actual length was likely greater). The anterior end of the animal (the proboscis) is inflated and wider than the posterior region (the trunk). S. reticulatus has a mouth surrounded by large hollow spines, each roughly 23 μm in width.

The cuticle has a distinctive anatomy, being composed of a fibrous mesh, spines with ridges, and upright plates. This indicates there was already significant diversity in ecdysozoan cuticle anatomy early on, near the start of the Cambrian explosion.

== Taxonomy ==
Anatomical features, like the flexible cuticle with hollow spines, indicate S. reticulatus is an ecdysozoan, a conclusion further supported by chemical analysis performed using Raman spectroscopy. S. reticulatus may be a scalidophoran, as supported by features like the arrangement of spines around its mouth, which is similar to that of some Cambrian scalidophorans. However, placement within Scalidophora is not yet confirmed.

== Taphonomy ==
Through silicification, preservation in chert has allowed for the three-dimensional preservation of carbonaceous cuticle in S. reticulatus remains. The preservation of fragments of isolated cuticle may be the result of moulting.

== Paleoecology ==
S. reticulatus likely lived in deeper-water areas. This indicates early ecdysozoans already inhabited these areas in addition to shallow-water ecosystems. The localities in which S. reticulatus has been found have yielded a wide array of other fossils. A diverse assemblage of microfossils, including algae, cyanobacteria, sponges, and many problematic taxa, have been found in the Liuchapo Formation.
