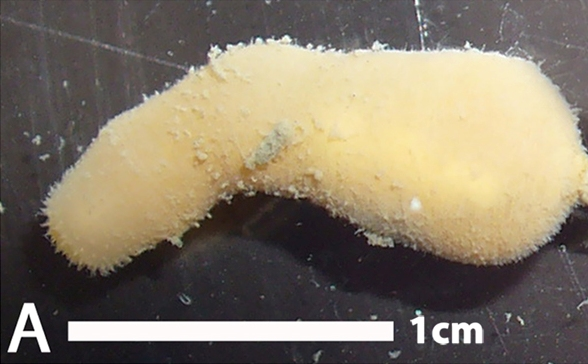
- Halicryptus spinulosus

Scientific classification
- Kingdom: Animalia
- Phylum: Priapulida
- Class: Halicryptomorpha
- Order: Halicryptomorphida
- Family: Halicryptidae
- Genus: Halicryptus von Siebold, 1849

= Halicryptus =

Genus of priapulid worms

Halicryptus is the sole genus of its class of priapulid worms, and has an important effect on the structure of soft-sediment communities.

This genus contains the following species:

- Halicryptus higginsi
- Halicryptus spinulosus - type species

Halicryptus spinulosus exhibits a wide distribution around the Arctic Ocean and can reach lengths of 4 cm as adults, while the distribution of Halicryptus higginsi appears to be restricted to the Beaufort Sea near Point Barrow, and can grow to about 40 cm, the largest known priapulids, even if 20 cm long adults are more common.

== Halicryptus spinulosus ==
Halicryptus spinulosus is a species of priapulid worm found in marine environments. It is a macrobenthic priapulid living in disjunct subarctic brackish seas, including the White Sea, waters off Iceland, northern Siberia and Alaska, and in an outlying range in the Baltic Sea. Known for its distinctive spiny appearance, this worm plays a role in the benthic ecosystem, often inhabiting sandy or muddy substrates. Like other priapulids, it has a relatively simple body structure and is considered a predator, feeding on small invertebrates. Its presence provides insights into the evolutionary history and ecological roles of priapulids, linking modern forms to ancient lineages. lives in sulfide-rich, oxygen-poor sediments. During elevated sulfide levels it increasingly relies on anaerobic metabolism and turns black, due to a film of bacteria covering its cuticle.

== See also ==
- Lemburg, C. (1995). "Ultrastructure of the introvert and associated structures of the larvae of Halicryptus spinulosus (Priapulida)". Zoomorphology. 115: 11–29. doi:10.1007/BF00397931. S2CID 42437901.
