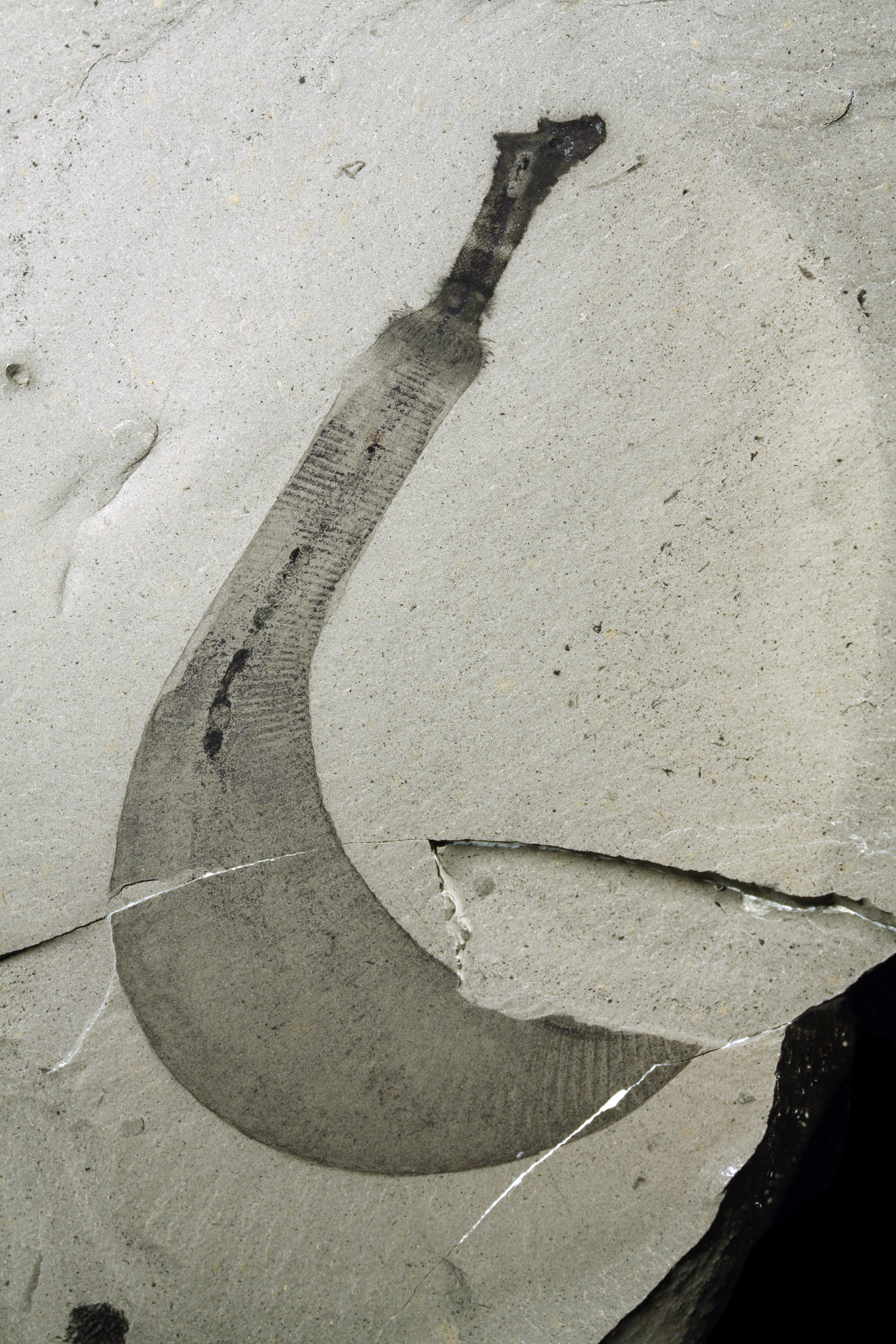
- Ottoia prolifica from the Walcott Quarry of the Burgess Shale (Middle Cambrian) near Field, British Columbia, Canada.

Scientific classification
- Kingdom: Animalia
- Subkingdom: Eumetazoa
- Clade: ParaHoxozoa
- Clade: Bilateria
- Clade: Nephrozoa
- Clade: Protostomia
- Superphylum: Ecdysozoa
- Clade: Scalidophora; Lemburg, 1995

Phyla
- Kinorhyncha
- Loricifera
- Priapulida (sensu lato)
  - Archaeopriapulida† (paraphyletic?)
  - Priapulida
Possible stem groups
- Palaeoscolecida† (possibly paraphyletic)
  - †Chalazoscolecidae
  - †Cricocosmida —possible stem arthropods
  - Other articulated microfossils
- †Shergoldana
- †Markuelia
- †Qinscolex
- †Shanscolex
- †Xinliscolex
- †Dahescolex
- †Zhongpingscolex

Synonyms
- Cephalorhyncha sensu Nielsen, 1995; Priapozoa

= Scalidophora =

Clade of ecdysozoan animals

Scalidophora is a group of marine pseudocoelomate ecdysozoans that was proposed on morphological grounds to unite three phyla: the Kinorhyncha, the Priapulida and the Loricifera. The three phyla have four characters in common — chitinous cuticle that is moulted, rings of scalids on the introvert, flosculi, and two rings of introvert retracts. The introvert and abdomen are separated by a distinct neck region in all groups, but in adult macroscopic priapulids it becomes rudimentary in Priapulus and is completely absent in Halicryptus. However, the monophyly of the Scalidophora was not supported by several molecular studies, where the position of the Loricifera was uncertain, closely related to Nematoida and Panarthropoda, or as the sister group to Nematoda. A 2022 study by Howard and co-authors recovered a monophyletic Scalidophora, but suggested that non-monophyly of Scalidophora should not be ruled out.

The genus Markuelia, known from fossilized embryos from the middle Cambrian, is thought to be a stem scalidophoran. The Cambrian genus Spinosoma may also be a scalidophoran, although this placement is not certain.

The group is named after the spines (scalids) covering the introvert (head that can be retracted into the trunk).

A similar group Cephalorhyncha (meaning "beak"-head) was proposed by Malakhov in 1980 as a phylum consisting of Priapulida, Kinorhyncha, and Nematomorpha, with Lorificera being added later. Nielsen recognised Priapulida, Kinorhyncha and Loricifera as a monophyletic group and in 1995 chose to use the name Cephalorhyncha for a group uniting the three phyla, excluding the Nematomorpha.
