= Saccus (genus) =

Saccus Temporal range: Early Cambrian (Fortunian), ~535 Ma

Scientific classification
- Kingdom: Animalia
- Superphylum: Ecdysozoa
- Genus: †Saccus; Liu et al., 2024

Species
- †Saccus xixiangensis Liu et al., 2024; †Saccus necopinus Liu et al., 2024

Extinct genus of ecdysozoans

Saccus is a fossil genus of ecdysozoans that lived during the Fortunian age of the Early Cambrian, around 535 Ma. It is known from exceptionally preserved embryos found in the Kuanchuanpu Formation of southern Shaanxi Province, China, which have been assigned to two species, S. xixiangensis and S. necopinus.
