= Priapulites =

Priapulites Temporal range: Middle Pennsylvanian

Scientific classification
- Kingdom: Animalia
- Phylum: Priapulida
- Class: Priapulimorpha
- Order: Priapulimorphida
- Genus: †Priapulites; Schram, 1973
- Species: †P. konecniorum

Binomial name
- †Priapulites konecniorum Schram, 1973

Extinct genus of priapulid worms

Priapulites is a fossil priapulid from the Mazon Creek fossil beds. It is the earliest-known crown-group priapulid, and is closely related to the Priapulidae. A detailed description was conducted by Simon Conway Morris.
