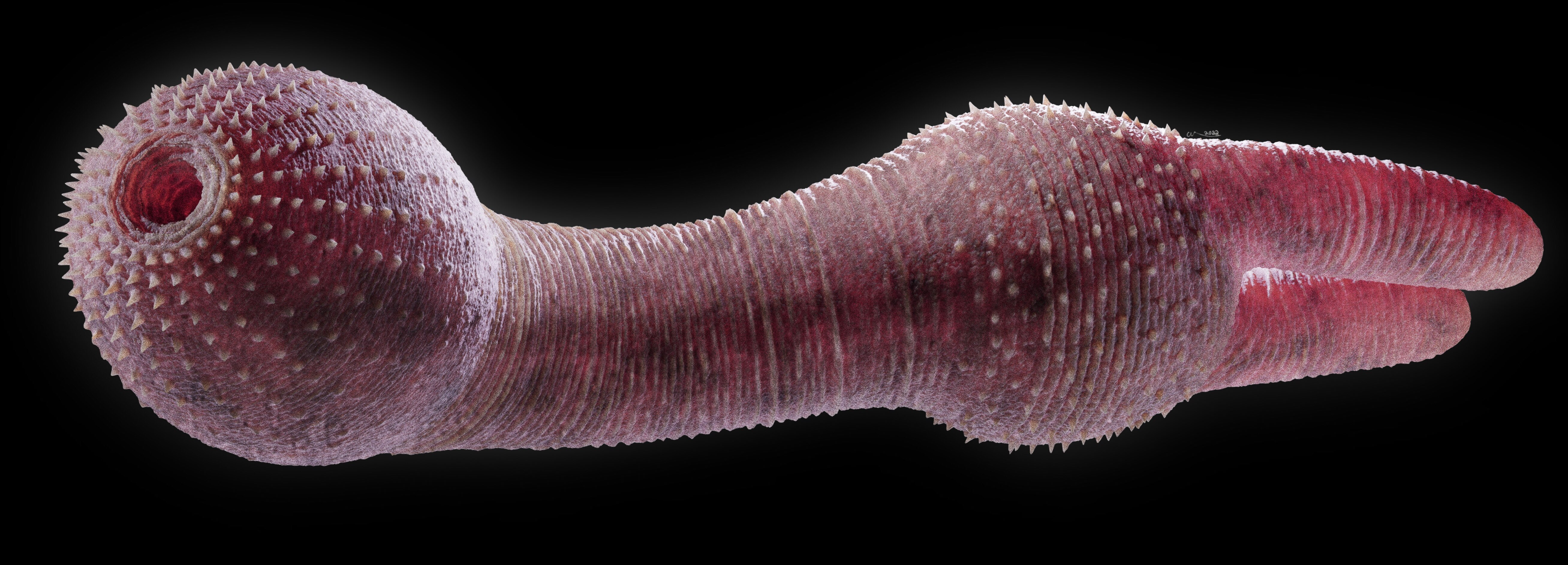
- Reconstruction

Scientific classification
- Kingdom: Animalia
- Phylum: Priapulida
- Family: †Xiaoheiqingidae
- Genus: †Xiaoheiqingella
- Species: †X. peculiaris

Binomial name
- †Xiaoheiqingella peculiaris Hu in Chen et al. 2002

= Xiaoheiqingella =

Xiaoheiqingella Temporal range: Chengjiang

Extinct genus of priapulid worms

Xiaoheiqingella is an extinct priapulid known from the Chengjiang biota, synonymous with Yunnanpriapulus and thought to belong to the priapulid crown group. It is estimated to have measured between 7 mm and 1 cm. Only fourteen fossil specimens are known
