= Lecythioscopa =

Lecythioscopa Temporal range: 505 Ma Burgess Shale

Scientific classification
- Kingdom: Animalia
- Stem group: Priapulida (?)
- Class: †Archaeopriapulida
- Genus: †Lecythioscopa; Conway Morris, 1977

Species
- L. simplex (Walcott, 1931) Conway Morris 1977

Synonyms
- Canadia simplex Walcott 1931

Extinct genus of priapulid worms

Lecythioscopa is a genus of probable archaeopriapulid known from two specimens from the Walcott Quarry from the Middle Cambrian Burgess Shale.

== Morphology ==
The specimens of Lectythioscopa are both missing their posterior portions, leaving a head, comparable to the proboscis of other priapulids, and long trunk, which is curved in both specimens. The animal was probably a burrower due to its external radial symmetry.

== History ==
The species was originally placed as Canadia simplex by Charles Walcott in a 1931 publication based on a single specimen. Simon Conway Morris later identified what was previously considered a specimen of Canadia dubia as sharing similar features, placing them both under the name of Lecythioscopa simplex.
