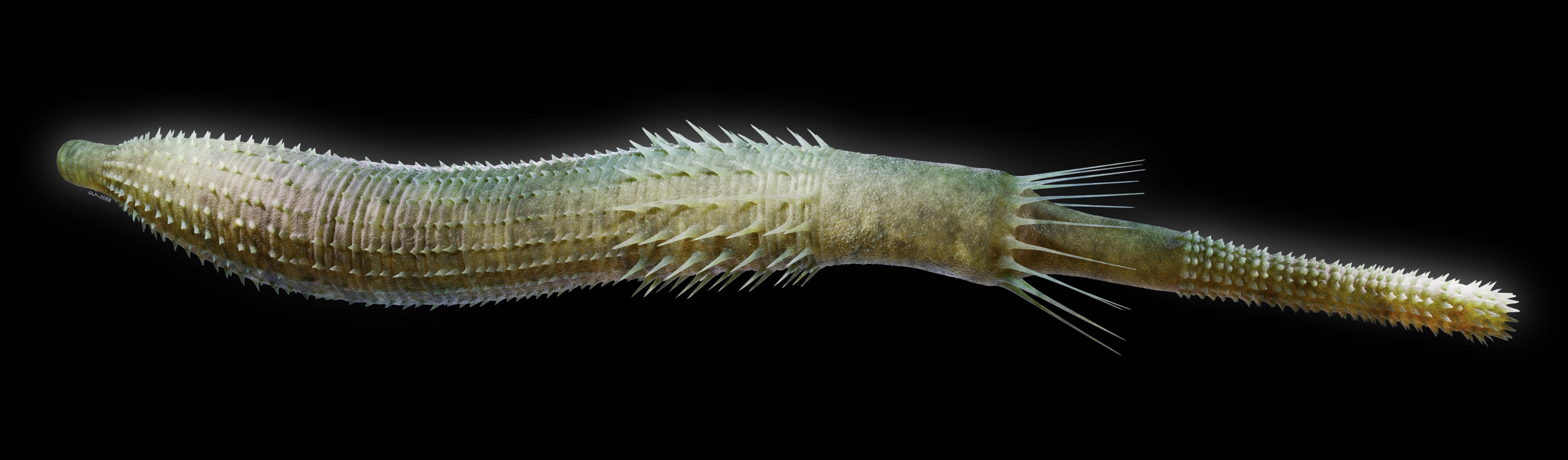
- Reconstruction

Scientific classification
- Kingdom: Animalia
- Stem group: Priapulida (?)
- Class: †Archaeopriapulida
- Genus: †Corynetis; Luo & Hu 1999

Species
- Corynetis brevis Luo & Hu 1999; Corynetis fortis Hu et al 2012

= Corynetis =

Corynetis Temporal range: Cambrian Stage 3 Chengjiang

Extinct genus of priapulid worms

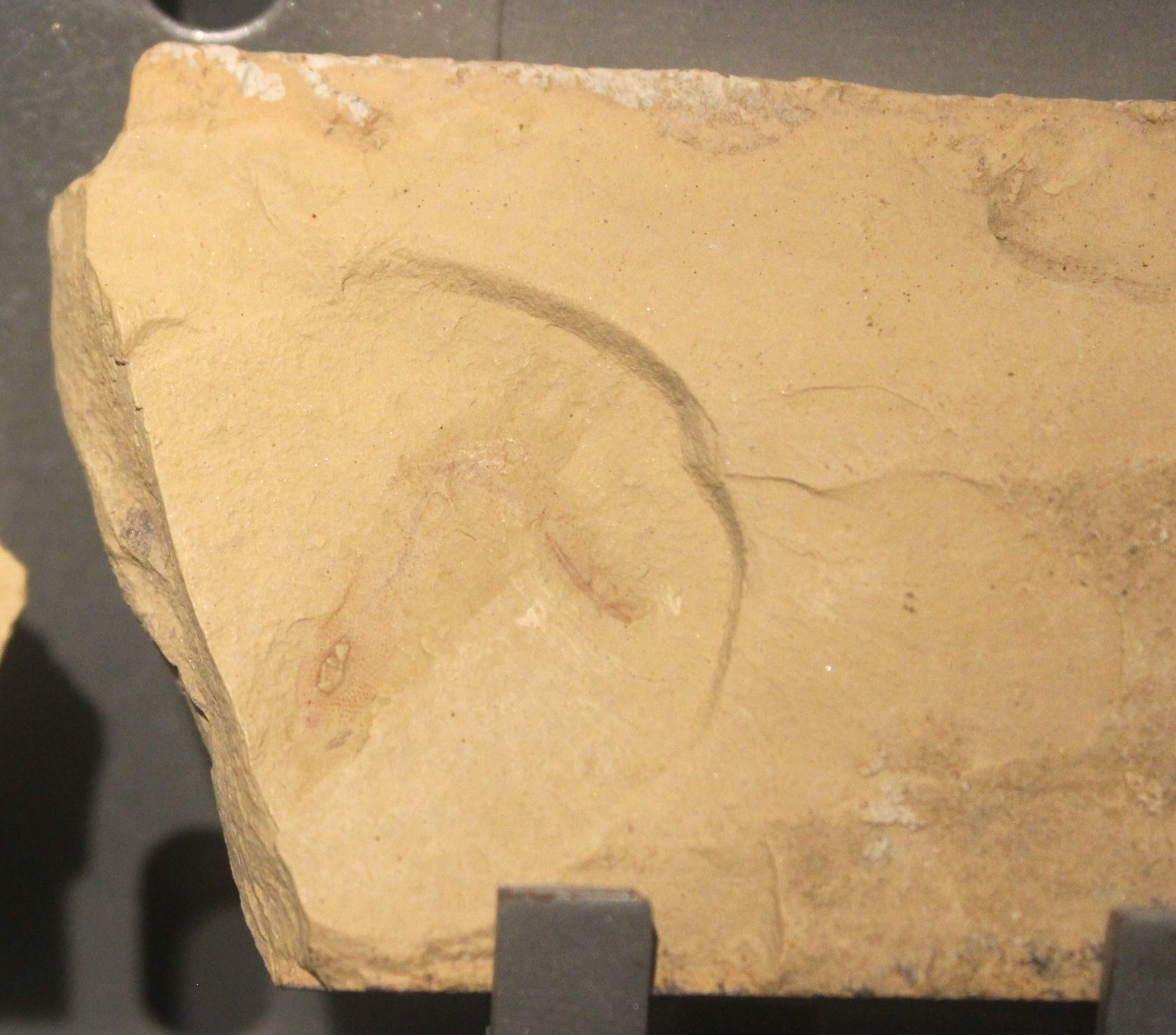
Fossil specimen, Geological Museum of China

Corynetis is a genus of archaeopriapulid known from the Chengjiang biota, and a senior synonym of Anningvermis multispinosus.
