= Chaetostephanidae =

Scientific classification
- Domain: Eukaryota
- Kingdom: Animalia
- Phylum: Priapulida
- Class: Seticoronaria
- Family: Chaetostephanidae
- Genus: Maccabeus; Por, 1973

Species
- Maccabeus tentaculatus Por, 1973; Maccabeus cirratus Malakhov, 1979

Synonyms
- Chaetostephanidae = Maccabeidae

Genus of priapulid worms

Maccabeus is the sole genus of seticoronarian priapulid worms. It dwells inside an agglutinated tube.
