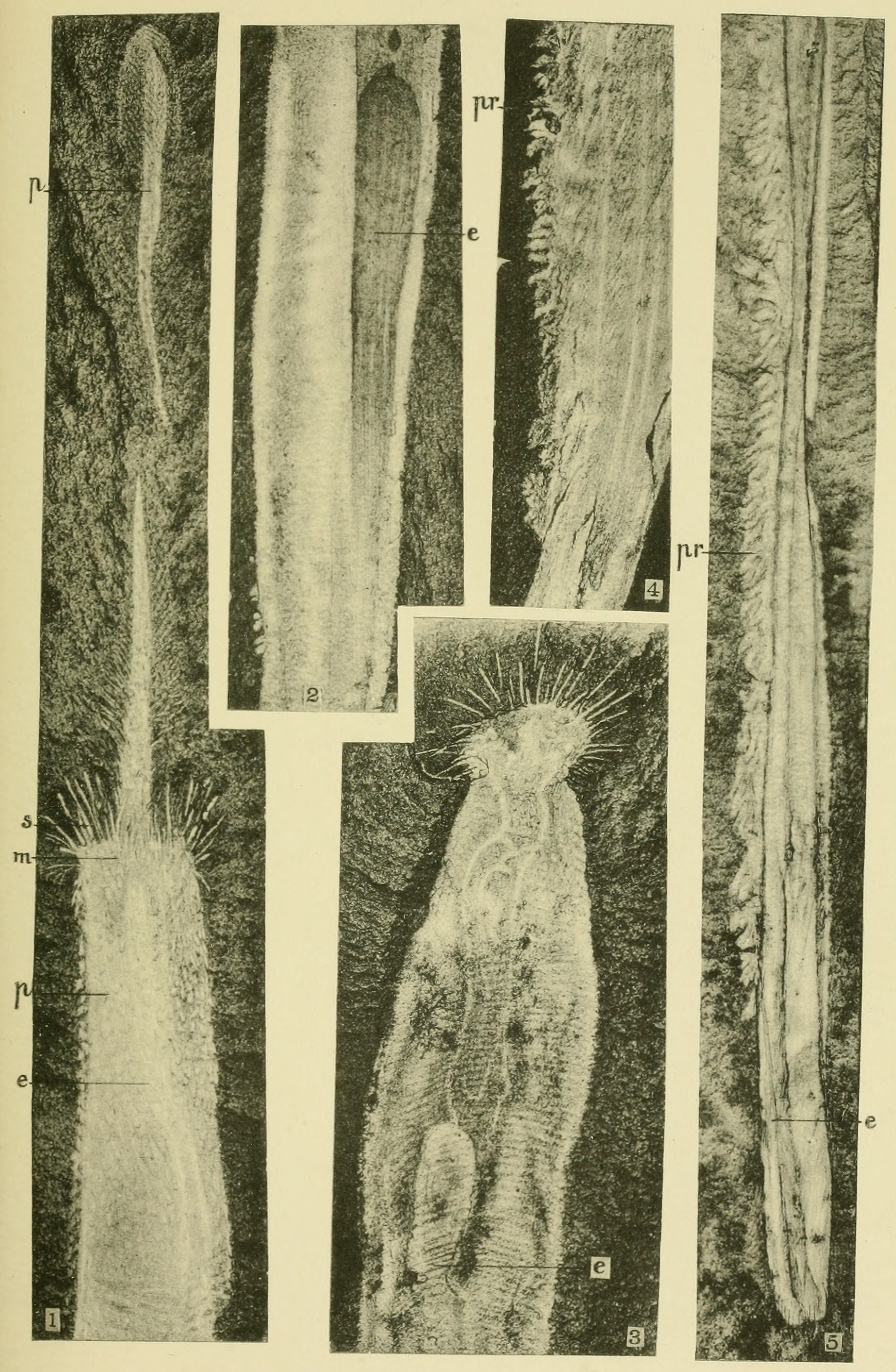
- Retouched images from Walcott's description of Miskoia, now synonymized with Louisella

Scientific classification
- Kingdom: Animalia
- Stem group: Priapulida (?)
- Class: †Archaeopriapulida
- Family: †Miskoiidae
- Genus: †Louisella; Walcott, 1911

Species
- L. pedunculata Walcott, 1911

= Louisella =

Louisella Temporal range: Middle Cambrian

Extinct genus of worms

Louisella is a genus of worm known from the Middle Cambrian Burgess Shale. It was originally described by Charles Walcott in 1911 as a holothurian echinoderm, and represents a senior synonym of Miskoia, which was originally described as an annelid. 48 specimens of Louisella are known from the Greater Phyllopod bed, where they comprise < 0.1% of the community. It has been stated to have palaeoscolecid-like sclerites, though this is not in fact the case.

It's also been interpreted as an annelid and a sipunculan, (neither on particularly compelling grounds) and a pripaulid, but it is more conservatively considered to represent an ecdysozoan worm; deep ecdysozoan relationships are not yet well resolved, making a more precise affiliation challenging.
