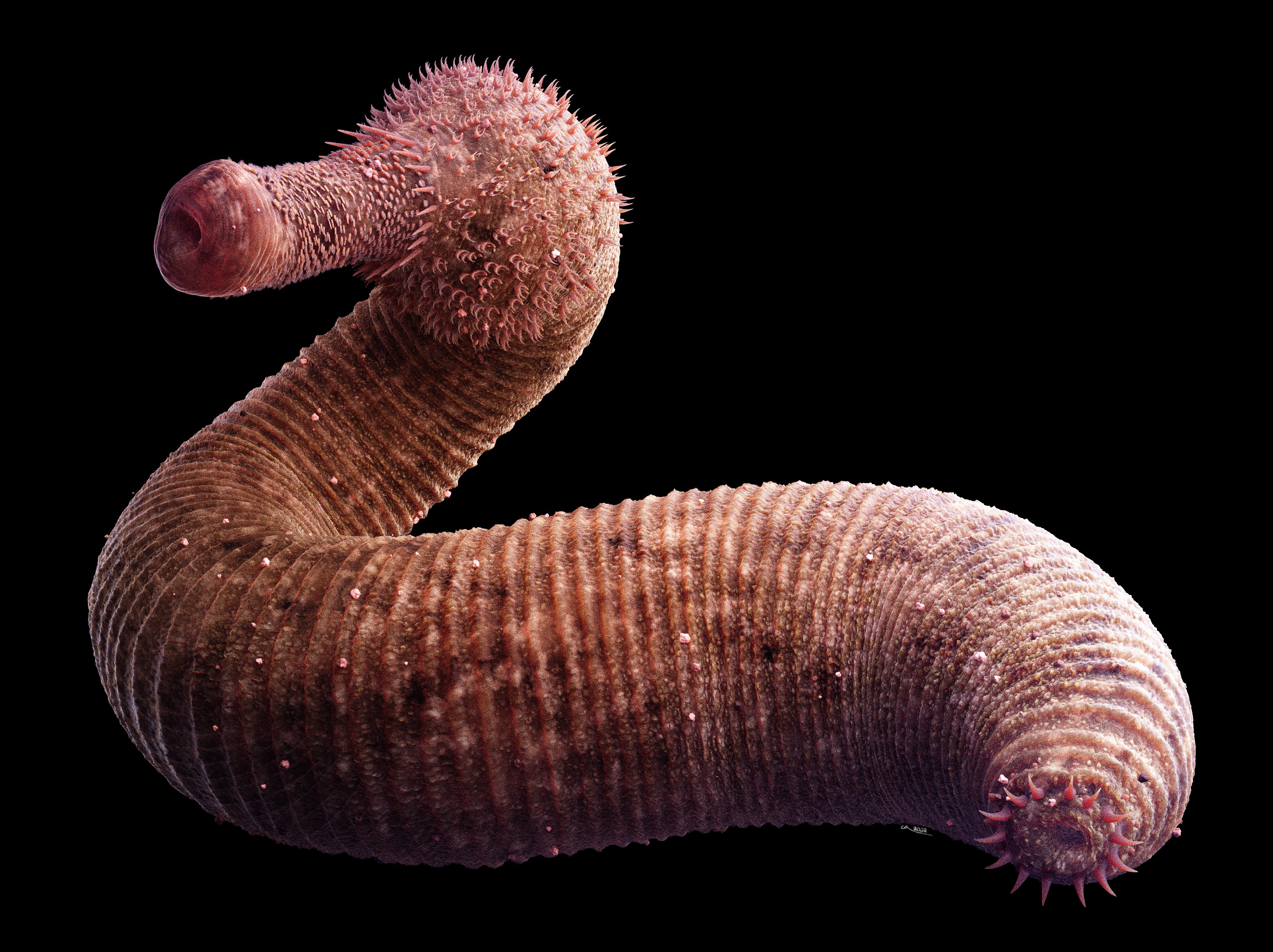
- Reconstruction of Ottoia prolifica.
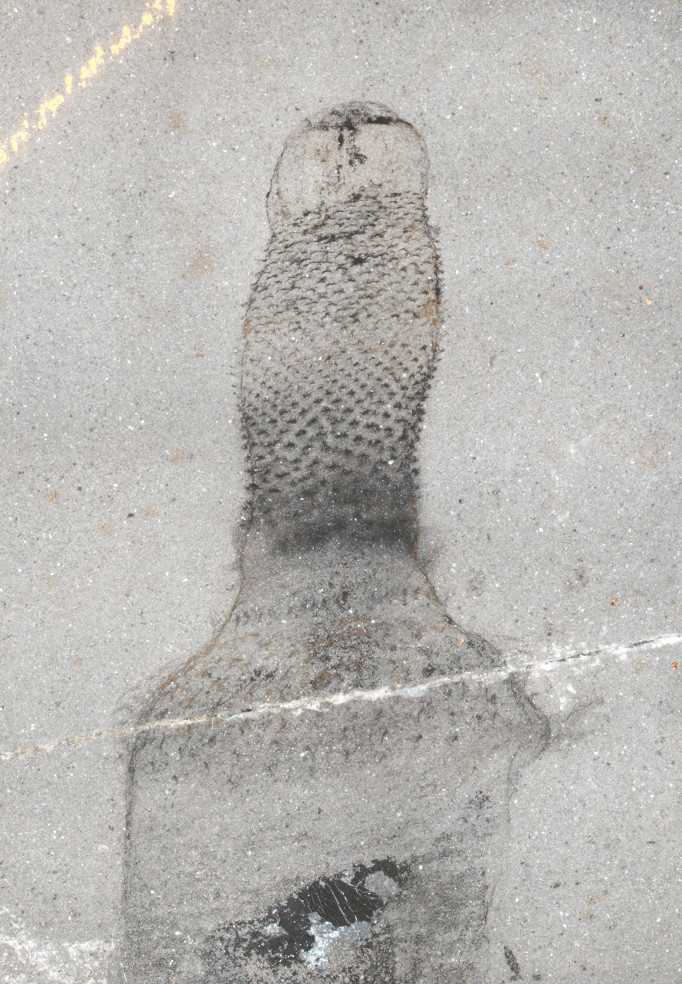
- The anterior portion of Ottoia prolifica, illustrating annulation and the eversible proboscis. From Smith et al. (2015)

Scientific classification
- Kingdom: Animalia
- Stem group: Priapulida (?)
- Family: †Ottoiidae; Walcott, 1911
- Genus: †Ottoia; Walcott, 1911

Species
- O. prolifica Walcott, 1911 (type); O. tricuspida Smith et al., 2015

= Ottoia =

Ottoia Temporal range: Miaolingian–Furongian (Floian ?)

Extinct genus of priapulid worms

Ottoia is a stem-group archaeopriapulid worm known from Cambrian fossils. Although priapulid-like worms from various Cambrian deposits are often referred to Ottoia on spurious grounds, the only clear Ottoia macrofossils come from the Burgess Shale of British Columbia, which was deposited 508 million years ago. Microfossils extend the record of Ottoia throughout the Western Canada Sedimentary Basin, from the mid- to late Cambrian. A few fossil finds are also known from China.

== Morphology ==
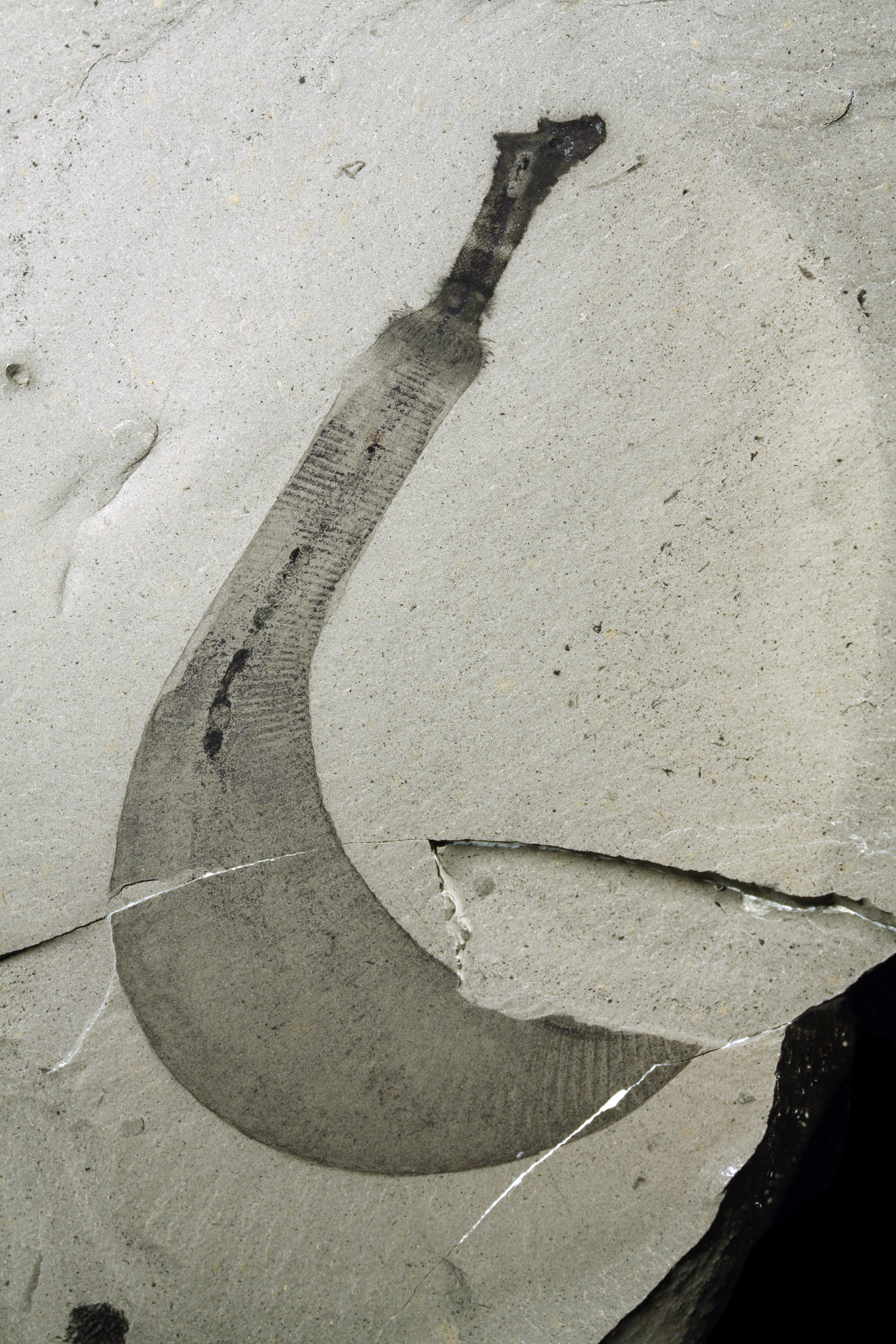
Holotype specimen of Ottoia tricuspida, from Smith et al. 2015

Ottoia specimens are on average 8 centimeters in length. Both length and width show variation with contraction; shorter specimens often being wider than longer ones. The characteristic proboscis of priapulids is present at the anterior, attached to the trunk of the animal, proceeded by the "bursa" at the posterior. The organism's body is bilaterally symmetrical, however, its anterior displays external radial symmetry. Like some other modern invertebrates, a cuticle restricts the size of and protects the animal.

The trunk holds the internal organs of the organism, divided into seventy to a hundred annulations of varying spacing, depending on curvature and contraction. The posterior displays a series of hooks, which likely acted as anchors during burrowing. Muscles support the animal and retract the bursa and proboscis. A gut leading from the anus in the bursa to the mouth in the proboscis runs through the trunk's spacious body cavity, and a concentration of gut muscles serve the function of a gizzard. A nerve chord runs down the organism's length. In addition to the other organs, it is possible Ottoia contained urogenital organs in its trunk. There is no evidence of a respiratory organ, though the bursa may have served this purpose.

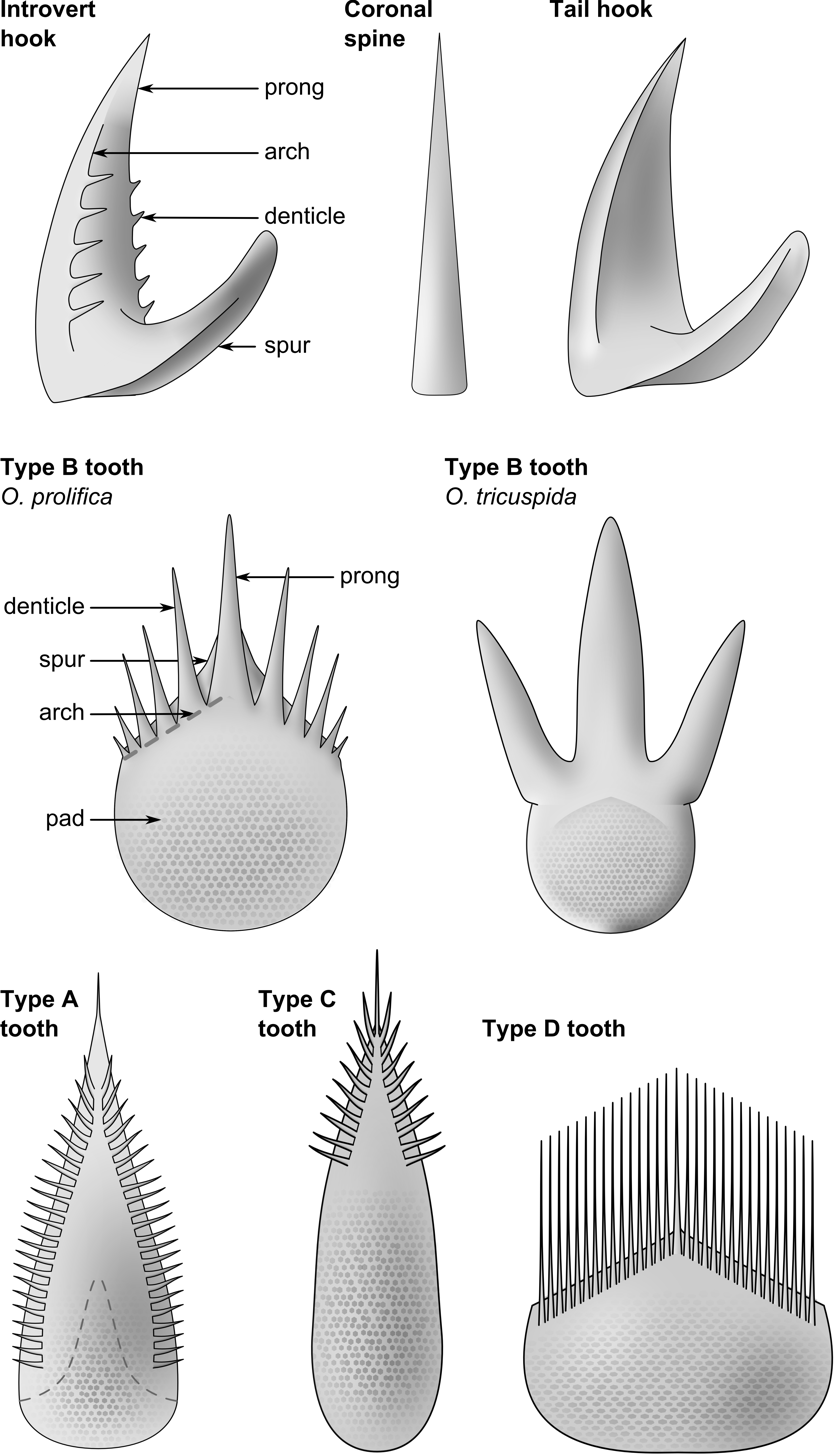
Schematic diagrams of Ottoia sclerite morphologies. Sclerites comprise a broad, flat basal pad and a thickened, usually triangular arch. Denticles arise from the lateral margins of the arch; distal extension of the arch gives rise to a prong. An oblique spur arises from the basal region.

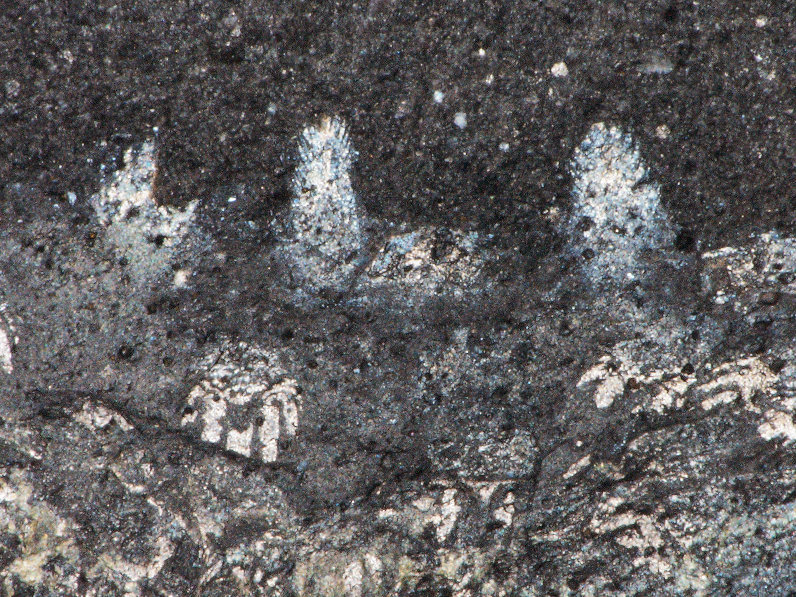
Teeth of Ottoia prolifica, from Smith et al. 2015

The everted proboscis of Ottoia bears an armature of teeth and hooks. The detailed morphology of these elements distinguishes the two described species, O. tricuspida and O. prolifica. At the base of the pharynx, separated from the teeth by an unarmed region, sits a ring of spines. Behind this, at the front of the trunk, lies a series of hooks and spines, arranged in a quincunx pattern like the five dots on a domino or dice.

== Ecology ==
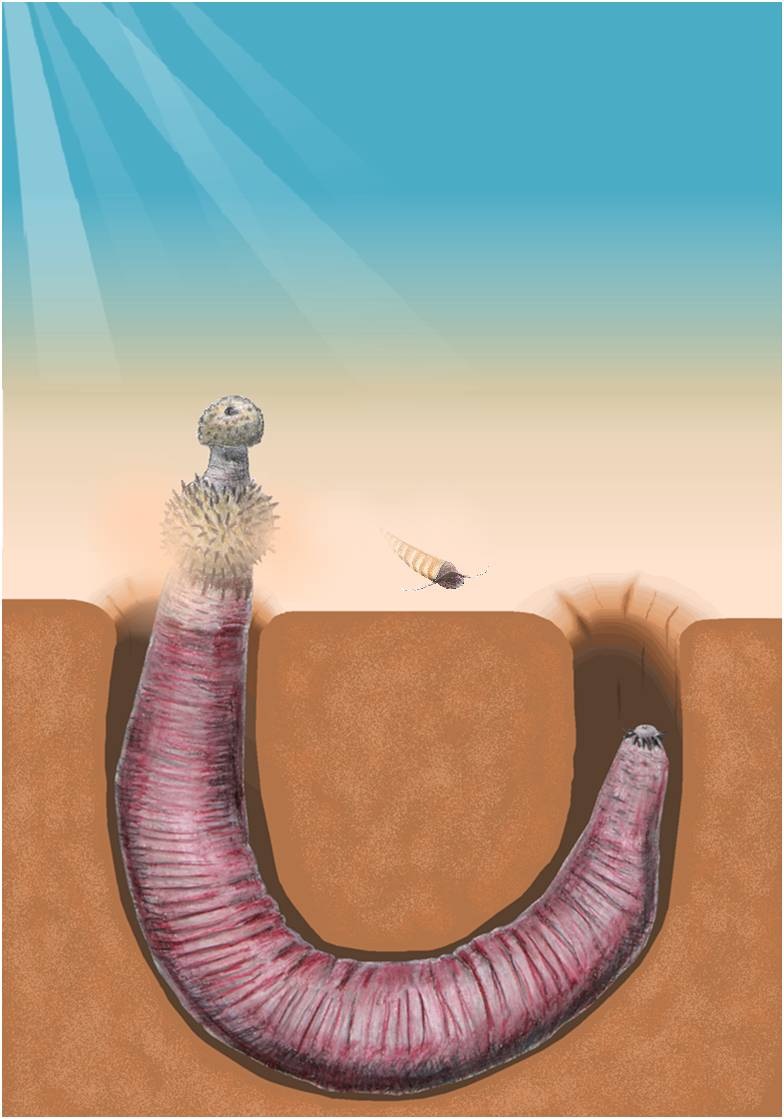
A reconstruction of Ottoia burrowing in substrate, nearby a Haplophrentis.

Ottoia was a burrower that hunted prey with its eversible proboscis. It also appears to have scavenged on dead organisms such as the arthropod Sidneyia.

The spines on the proboscis of Ottoia have been interpreted as teeth used to capture prey. Its mode of life is uncertain, but it is thought to have been an active burrower, moving through the sediment after prey, and is believed to have lived within a U-shaped burrow that it constructed in the substrate. From that place of relative safety, it could extend its proboscis in search of prey. Gut contents show that this worm was a predator, often feeding on the hyolithid Haplophrentis (a shelled animal similar to mollusks), generally swallowed them head-first. They also show evidence of cannibalism, which is common in priapulids today.

== Preservation ==
Because of its bottom-living habit and the location of the Burgess Shale site at the foot of a high limestone reef, one may presume the relative immobility of Ottoia placed it in danger of being carried away and/or buried by any underwater mud avalanche from the cliff top. This may explain why it remains one of the more abundant specimens of the Burgess Shale fauna.

== Distribution ==
At least 1000 Burgess Shale specimens are known in the UNSM collections alone, in addition to the ROM collections and hundreds of specimens elsewhere. 677 specimens of Ottoia are known from the Greater Phyllopod bed, where they comprise 1.29% of the community.

Ottoia has also been reported from Middle Cambrian deposits in Utah and Spain, Nevada, and various other localities. Nevertheless, these reports are insecure, and the only verifiable Ottoia macrofossils herald from the Burgess Shale itself.

Microfossils corresponding to Ottoia teeth, however, have a much broader distribution, and are found throughout the Western Canada Sedimentary Basin. Indeed, putative candidates (initially described under the ICBN as Goniomorpha) may extend the range of Ottoia, or at least similar priapulans, into the Ordovician. One poorly preserved specimen that probably belongs to Ottoia, was discovered in the Lower Ordovician Madaoyu Formation in Hunan, China.

== See also ==
- Paleobiota of the Burgess Shale
