= Scolecofurca =

Scolecofurca Temporal range: 505 Ma Burgess Shale

Scientific classification
- Kingdom: Animalia
- Stem group: Priapulida (?)
- Genus: †Scolecofurca; Conway Morris, 1977
- Species: †S. rara

Binomial name
- †Scolecofurca rara Conway Morris, 1977

Extinct genus of priapulid worms

Scolecofurca is a genus of stem-group priapulid worm dating from the Middle Cambrian period approximately 505 million years ago.

It is known from a single fossil specimen from the Raymond Quarry in the Burgess Shale in the Canadian Rockies.

The only known species in the species Scolecofurca rara was first described by Conway Morris in 1977 as a possible primitive priapulid, but later shown to belong to the priapulid stem group. Its name is derived from the Greek skolex (worm) and the Latin furca (fork) and rara (infrequent).

== Morphology ==
Scolecofura's single fossil specimen is 6.5 centimeters in length. The fossil displays a proboscis of constant width, with two 3 millimeter tentacles at the anterior. The tentacles most likely would have functioned for sensory purposes rather than for feeding. The trunk of the organism is lined with annulations separated by 7 millimeters. The specimen is incomplete, and the posterior features of the animal are currently unknown.
