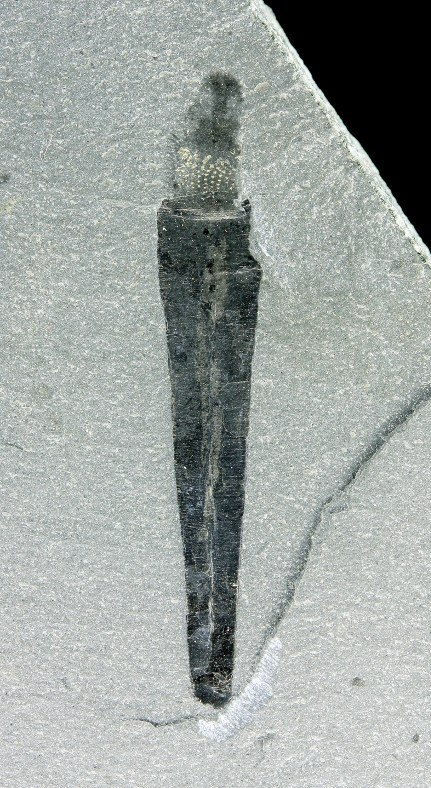
- Selkirkia columbia fossil from the Burgess Shale. From Smith et al. (2015)
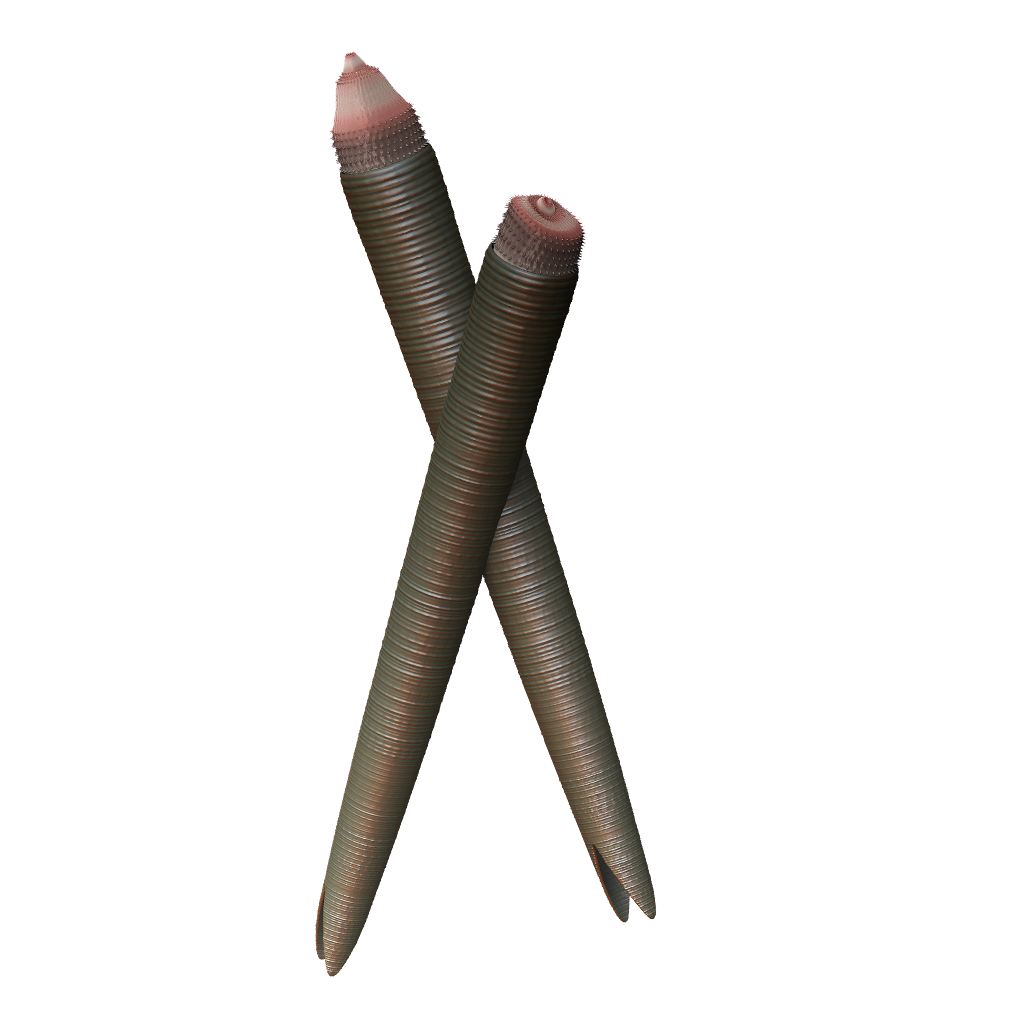
- Restoration of Selkirkia columbia

Scientific classification
- Kingdom: Animalia
- Stem group: Priapulida (?)
- Class: †Archaeopriapulida
- Family: †Selkirkiidae; Conway Morris, 1977
- Genus: †Selkirkia; Walcott, 1911

Species
- S. columbia Conway Morris, 1977; S. elongata Luo & Hu, 1999; S. sinica Luo & Hu, 1999; S. spencei Resser, 1939; S. willoughbyi Conway Morris & Robison, 1986; S. tsering Nanglu 2024

= Selkirkia =

Selkirkia Temporal range: Cambrian Stage 3–Pragian

Extinct genus of priapulid worms

Selkirkia is a genus of predatory, tubicolous priapulid worms known from the Middle Cambrian Burgess Shale, Ogygopsis Shale, Puncoviscana Formation, the Early Ordovician Fezouata Formation and the early Devonian La Roche Formation. 142 specimens of Selkirkia are known from the Greater Phyllopod bed, where they comprise 0.27% of the community. In the Burgess Shale, 20% of the tapering, organic-walled tubes are preserved with the worm inside them, whereas the other 80% are empty (or sometimes occupied by one or more small agnostid trilobites). Whilst alive, the tubes were probably vertical, whereas trilobite-occupied tubes are horizontal.

== Morphology ==
Selkirkia had a body divisible into a proboscis towards the anterior of a trunk enclosed by a tube. The proboscis would have been partially invertable and was armed with several spinules and spines, decreasing size distally overall. It was controlled by at least two sets of anterior retractor muscles. Immediately behind the proboscis was the trunk, smooth for the most part but lined with papillae towards the anterior. Surrounding the trunk was the tube, which way very finely annulated (4 annulations per 0.1 millimeters).

== History ==
Members of Cambrorhytium were originally described as Selkirkia before their identification as a separate genus.
