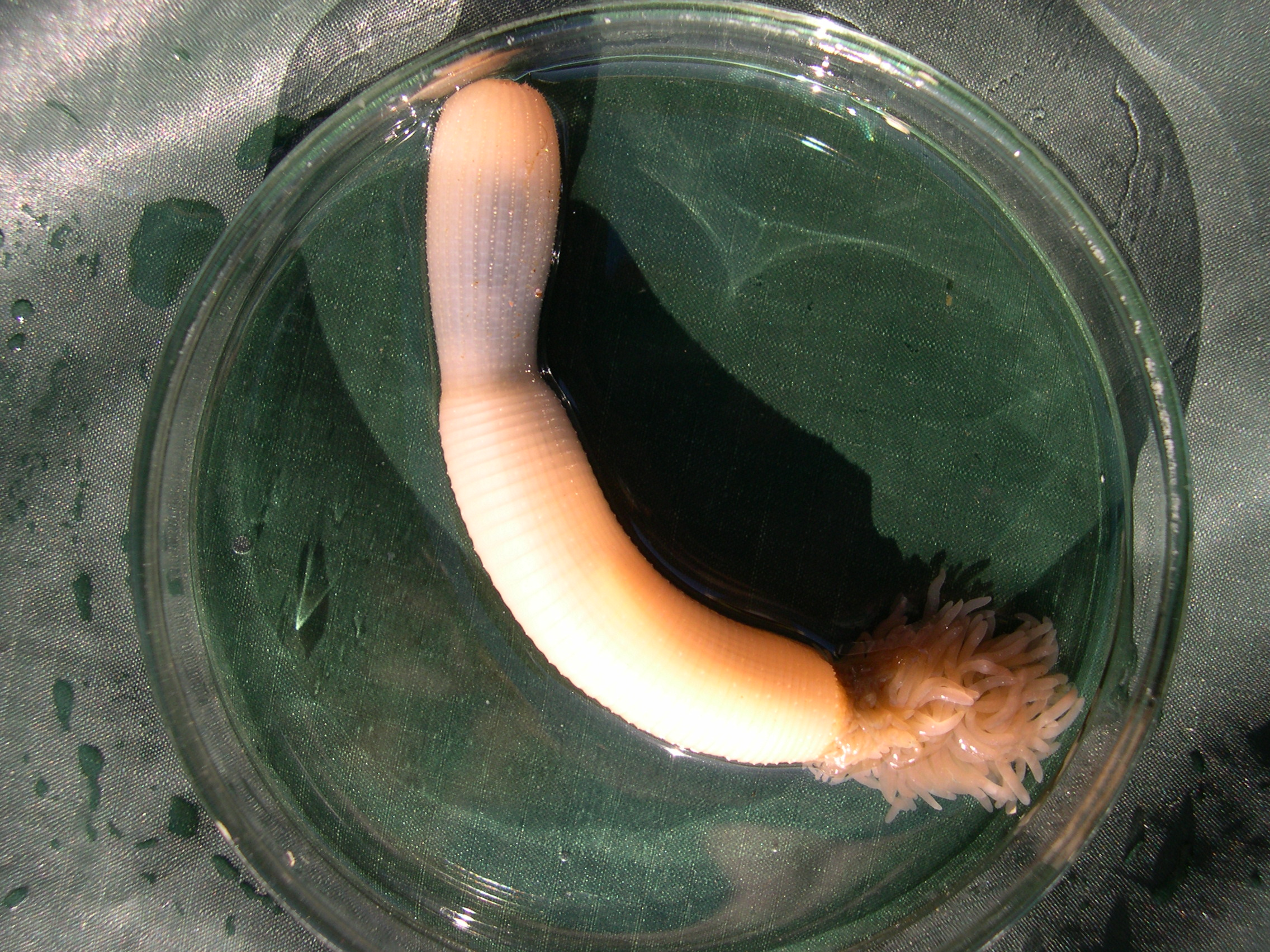
- Priapulus caudatus

Scientific classification
- Kingdom: Animalia
- Subkingdom: Eumetazoa
- Clade: ParaHoxozoa
- Clade: Bilateria
- Clade: Nephrozoa
- Clade: Protostomia
- Superphylum: Ecdysozoa
- Clade: Scalidophora
- Phylum: Priapulida; Théel, 1906

Orders
- Priapulimorpha; Halicryptomorpha; Stem group order: Ottoimorpha; also see text

= Priapulida =

Priapulida Temporal range: Cambrian–Recent Crown group representatives from the Carboniferous

Phylum of unsegmented marine worms

Priapulida (priapulid worms, from Gr. πριάπος, priāpos 'Priapus' + Lat. -ul-, diminutive), sometimes referred to as penis worms, is a phylum of unsegmented marine worms. The name of the phylum relates to Priapus, Greek god of fertility, because their general shape and their extensible spiny introvert (eversible) proboscis may resemble the shape of a human penis.

They live in the mud, except for a few tropical meiobenthic species which live in medium- to coarse-grained sands, and are found in comparatively shallow waters to deep waters, with the larger forms like Priapulidae being restricted to colder environments, and smaller forms like Tubiluchus requiring warmer temperatures. Most meiobenthic forms live as shallow as 0.5 m, and Priapulus abyssorum has been found on depths of 3000–8000 m. Some species show a remarkable tolerance for hydrogen sulfide, anoxia and low salinity. Halicryptus spinulosus appears to prefer brackish shallow waters. They can be quite abundant in some areas. In an Alaskan bay as many as 85 adult individuals of Priapulus caudatus per square meter has been recorded, while the density of its larvae can be as high as 58,000 per square meter (5,390 per square foot). They feed on slow-moving invertebrates, such as polychaete worms. Twenty-two extant species of priapulid worms are known, half of them being of meiobenthic size.

Together with Echiura and Sipuncula, they were once placed in the taxon Gephyrea, but consistent morphological and molecular evidence supports their belonging to Ecdysozoa, which also includes arthropods and nematodes. Fossil findings show that the mouth design of the stem-arthropod Pambdelurion is identical with that of priapulids, indicating that their mouth is an original trait inherited from the last common ancestor of both priapulids and arthropods, even if modern arthropods no longer possess it.

The precise phylogenetic placement of Priapulida within Ecdysozoa remains unresolved, in part due to a lack of genomic and transcriptomic resources. Among Ecdysozoa, their nearest relatives may be Kinorhyncha and Loricifera; together, these three groups form the putative Scalidophora clade, named after the spines covering the introvert (scalids).

Priapulid-like fossils are known at least as far back as the Middle Cambrian. They were likely major predators of the Cambrian period. However, crown-group priapulids cannot be recognized until the Carboniferous. Priapulida appear to have retained some traits of the ancestral Ecdysozoan, leading some authors to describe them as "living fossils".

== Anatomy ==
Priapulids are cylindrical worm-like animals, ranging from about 0.2 to 39 centimetres (0.08 to 15.35 inches) long, with a median anterior mouth quite devoid of any armature or tentacles. They show both radial and bilateral symmetry. The gonads, protonephridia and ventral nerve cord are bilateral, while the introvert, pharynx and brain show radial symmetry, which appears to be a secondary trait. The larvae also show internal and external characteristics of radial symmetry. The adult body is divided into a main trunk or abdomen and a somewhat swollen proboscis region ornamented with longitudinal ridges. In addition, it is ringed and often has circles of spines, which are continued into the slightly protrusible pharynx. Family Priapulidae have species with a tail or a pair of caudal appendages. A slender tail or tail filament is also found in family Tubiluchidae. Appendages are absent in the remaining families. The body has a chitinous cuticle that is moulted as the animal grows. Members of the family Chaetostephanidae also secrete a gelatinous tube, open in both ends, which they live in.

There is a wide body-cavity, which has no connection with the renal or reproductive organs, so it is not a coelom; it is probably a blood-space or hemocoel. There are no vascular or respiratory systems, but the body cavity does contain phagocytic amoebocytes and cells containing the respiratory pigment haemerythrin.

The alimentary canal is straight, consisting of an eversible pharynx, an intestine, and a short rectum. The pharynx is muscular and lined by teeth. Three of the five extant families have gone through a significant miniaturization, becoming detritivores (Tubiluchidae and Meiopriapulidae) and filter feeders (Chaetostephanidae). The two remaining families of Priapulidae and Halicryptidae are larger carnivores that feed on other animals, although some species also consume detritus as larvae. The shape of the teeth reflect these different lifestyles, and seem to be adapted mainly towards grasping prey or raking detritus from the sediment into the mouth. The anus is terminal, although in Priapulus one or two hollow ventral diverticula of the body-wall stretch out behind it.

The nervous system consists of a nerve ring around the pharynx and a prominent cord running the length of the body with ganglia and longitudinal and transversal neurites consistent with an orthogonal organisation. The nervous system retains a basiepidermal configuration with a connection to the ectoderm, forming part of the body wall. There are no specialized sense organs, but there are sensory nerve endings in the body, especially on the proboscis.

The priapulids are gonochoristic, having two separate sexes (i.e. male and female). Their male and female organs are closely associated with the excretory protonephridia. They comprise a pair of branching tufts, each of which opens to the exterior on one side of the anus. The tips of these tufts enclose a flame-cell like those found in flatworms and other animals, and these probably function as excretory organs. As the animals mature, diverticula arise on the tubes of these organs, which develop either spermatozoa or ova. These sex cells pass out through the ducts. The perigenital area of the genus Tubiluchus exhibits sexual dimorphism.

=== Reproduction and development ===
For the species Priapulus caudatus, the 80 μm egg undergoes a total and radial cleavage following a symmetrical and subequal pattern. Development is remarkably slow, with the first cleavage taking place 15 hours after fertilization, gastrulation after several days and hatching of the first 'lorica' larvae after 15 to 20 days. The species Meiopriapulus fijiensis have direct development. In current systematics, they are described as protostomes, despite having a deuterostomic development. Because the group is so ancient, it is assumed the deuterostome condition, which appears to be ancestral for bilaterians, has been maintained.

== Fossil record ==
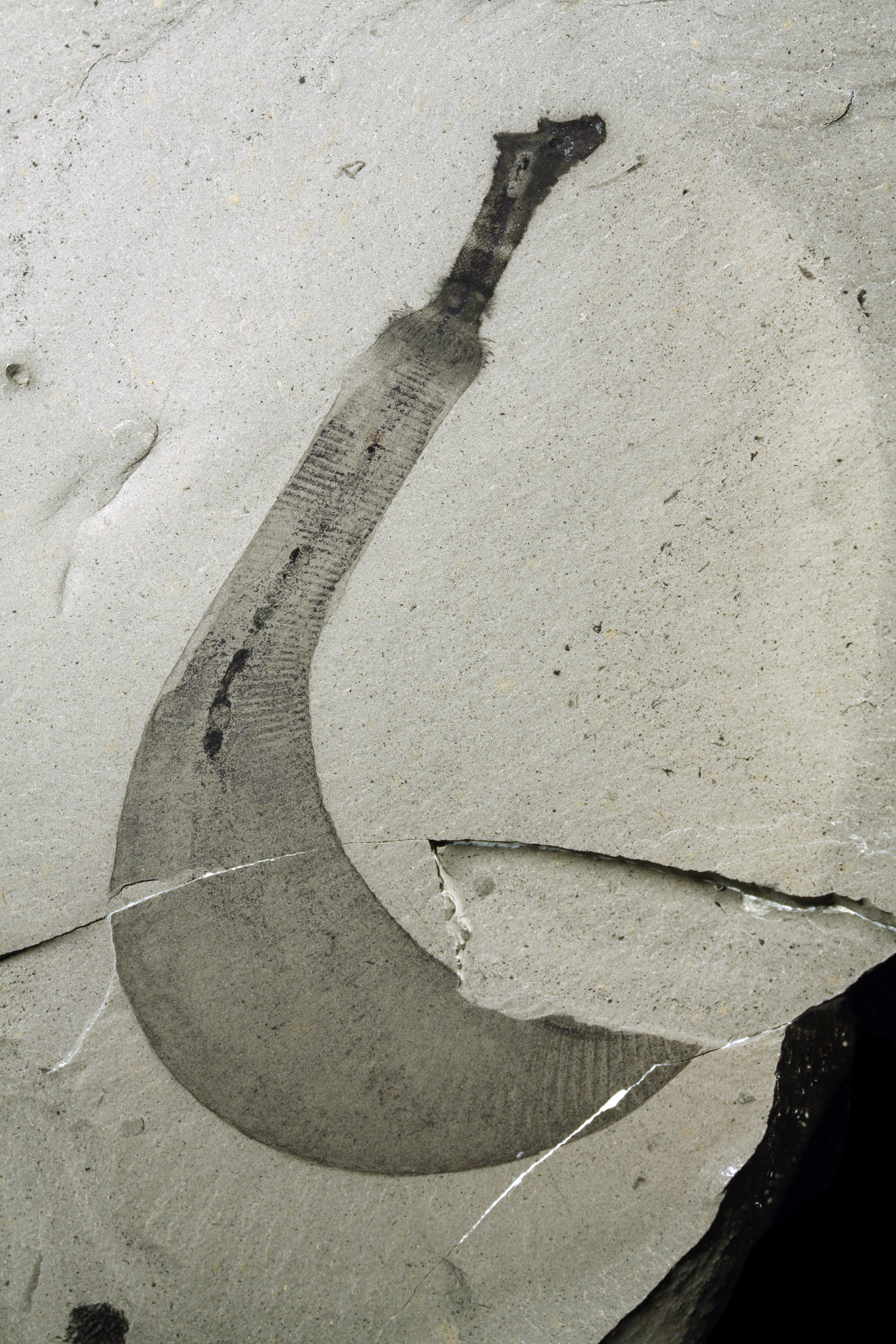
Ottoia tricuspida in the Burgess Shale (Middle Cambrian)

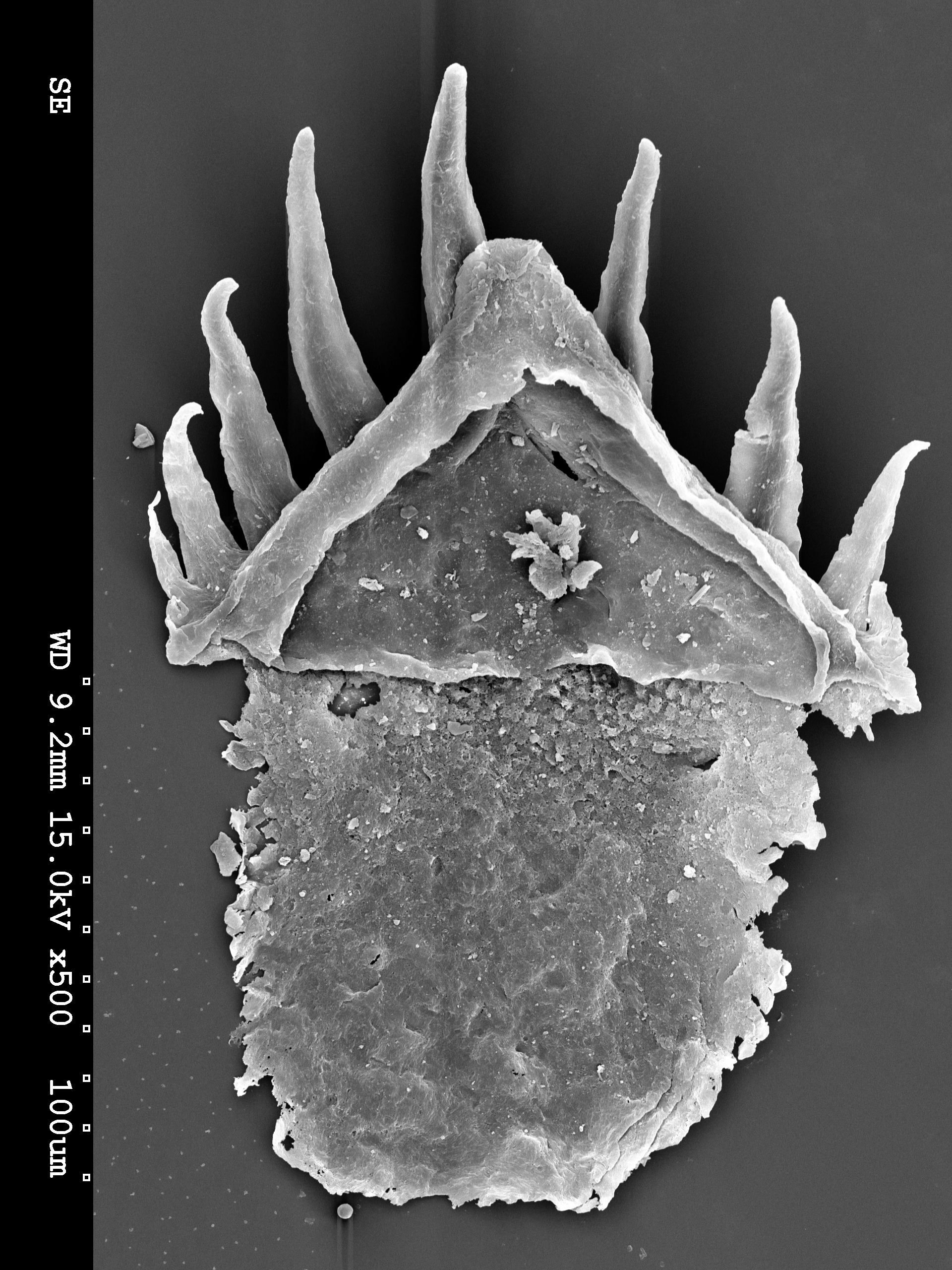
Microfossil of a priapulid tooth (Ottoia, Cambrian); from Smith et al. 2015

Stem-group priapulids are known from the Middle Cambrian Burgess Shale, where their soft-part anatomy is preserved, often in conjunction with their gut contents – allowing a reconstruction of their diets. In addition, isolated microfossils (corresponding to the various teeth and spines that line the pharynx and introvert) are widespread in Cambrian deposits, allowing the distribution of priapulids – and even individual species – to be tracked widely through Cambrian oceans. Trace fossils that are morphologically almost identical to modern priapulid burrows (Treptichnus pedum) officially mark the start of the Cambrian period, suggesting that priapulids, or at least close anatomical relatives, evolved around this time. Crown-group priapulid body fossils are first known from the Carboniferous.

== Phylogeny ==
=== External phylogeny ===
- Ecdysozoa >529 mya
  - Scalidophora
    - Priapulida
    - Kinorhyncha
  - - Nematoida
      - Nematoda
      - Nematomorpha
    - Panarthropoda
      - Onychophora
      - Tactopoda
        - Tardigrada
        - Arthropoda

=== Internal phylogeny ===
- - †Archaeopriapulida [paraphyletic]
  - †Ancalagonida Adrianov & Malakhov 1995
  - - †Markuelia Valkov 1983
    - - †Palaeoscolecida Conway Morris & Robinson 1986
      - - Kinorhyncha Reinhard 1887 (Spiny crown worms; Mud dragons)
        - Priapulida
          - Meiopriapulomorpha
            - Tubiluchidae
              - †Paratubiluchus Han et al. 2004
              - Meiopriapulus Morse 1981
              - Tubiluchus van der Land 1968
          - Priapulimorpha
            - Maccabeidae
              Maccabeus Por 1973
            - - Halicryptidae
                Halicryptus von Siebold 1849
              - Priapulidae
                - - †Priapulites Schram 1973
                  - †Xiaoheiqingella Hu 2002
                - - Priapulopsis Koren & Danielssen 1875
                  - - Acanthopriapulus van der Land 1970
                    - Priapulus Lamarck 1816

== Classification ==
There are 22 known extant species:

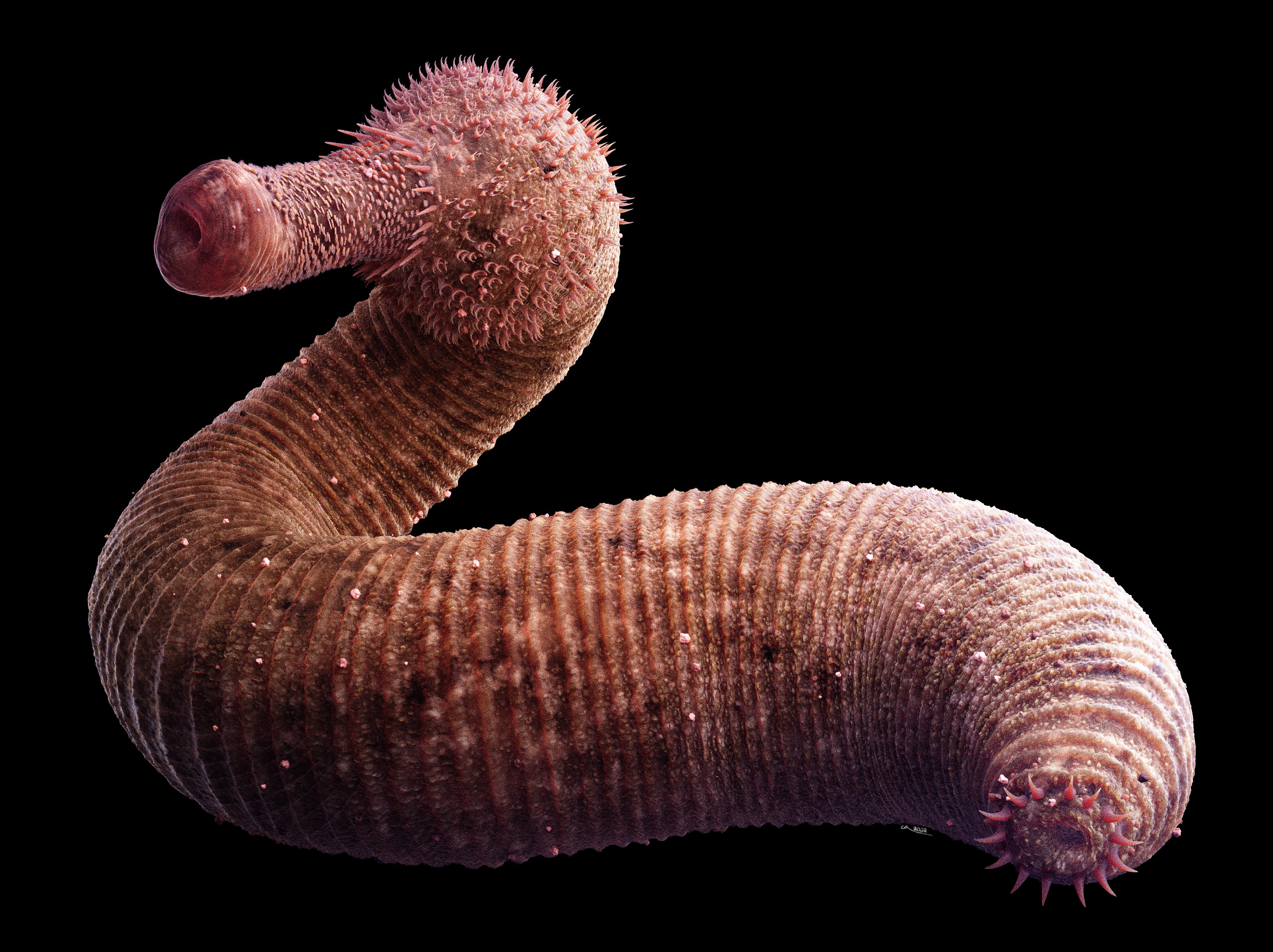
Illustration of Ottoia, a prehistoric priapulid.

Phylum Priapulida Théel 1906

- Order Halicryptomorpha Salvini-Plawen 1974 [Adrianov & Malakhov 1995; Salvini-Plawen 1974; Eupriapulida Lemburg, 1999]
  - Family Halicryptidae Salvini-Plawen 1974
    - Genus Halicryptus
      - Species H. higginsi (Shirley & Storch, 1999)
      - Species H. spinulosus (von Siebold, 1849)
- Order Priapulomorpha Adrianov & Malakhov 1995 (assigned its own order by)
  - Family Priapulidae Gosse 1855 [Xiaoheiqingidae (sic) Hu 2002]
    - Genus Acanthopriapulus
      - Species A. horridus (Théel, 1911)
    - Genus Priapulopsis
      - Species P. australis (de Guerne, 1886)
      - Species P. bicaudatus (Danielssen, 1869)
      - Species P. cnidephorus (Salvini-Plawen, 1973)
    - Genus Priapulus
      - Species P. abyssorum (Menzies, 1959)
      - Species P. caudatus (Lamarck, 1816)
      - Species P. tuberculatospinosus (Baird, 1868)
  - Family Tubiluchidae van der Land 1970 [Meiopriapulidae Adrianov & Malakhov 1995]
    - Genus Tubiluchus
      - Species T. arcticus (Adrianov, Malakhov, Tchesunov & Tzetlin, 1989)
      - Species T. australensis (van der Land, 1985)
      - Species T. corallicola (van der Land, 1968)
      - Species T. lemburgi (Schmidt-Rhaesa, Rothe & Martínez, 2013)
      - Species T. pardosi (Schmidt-Rhaesa, Panpeng & Yamasaki, 2017)
      - Species T. philippinensis (van der Land, 1985)
      - Species T. remanei (van der Land, 1982)
      - Species T. soyoae (Schmidt-Rhaesa, Panpeng & Yamasaki, 2017)
      - Species T. troglodytes (Todaro & Shirley, 2003)
      - Species T. vanuatensis (Adrianov & Malakhov, 1991)
  - Genus Meiopriapulus
    - Species M. fijiensis (Morse, 1981)
- Order Seticoronaria
  - Family Chaetostephanidae Por & Bromley 1974 [Chaetostephanidae Salvini-Plawen 1974]
    - Genus Maccabeus
      - Species M. cirratus (Malakhov, 1979)
      - Species M. tentaculatus (Por, 1973)

=== Extinct groups ===
Stem-group †Scalidophora

- Order †Ancalagonida Adrianov & Malakhov 1995 [Fieldiida Adrianov & Malakhov 1995]
  - Family †Ancalagonidae Conway Morris 1977
    - Genus †Ancalagon Conway Morris 1977
  - Family †Fieldiidae Conway Morris 1977
    - Genus †Fieldia Walcott 1912

Stem-group †Palaeoscolecida

- Family †Selkirkiidae Conway Morris 1977
  - Genus †Selkirkia Walcott 1911 non Hemsley 1884
- Order †Ottoiomorpha Adrianov & Malakhov 1995
  - Genus †Scolecofurca Conway Morris 1977
  - Family †Ottoiidae Walcott 1911
    - Genus †Ottoia Walcott 1911
  - Family †Corynetidae Huang, Vannier & Chen 2004
    - Genus †Corynetis Luo & Hu 1999 [Anningvermis Huang, Vannier & Chen 2004]
  - Family †Miskoiidae Walcott 1911
    - Genus †Miskoia Walcott 1911
    - Genus †Louisella Conway Morris 1977
