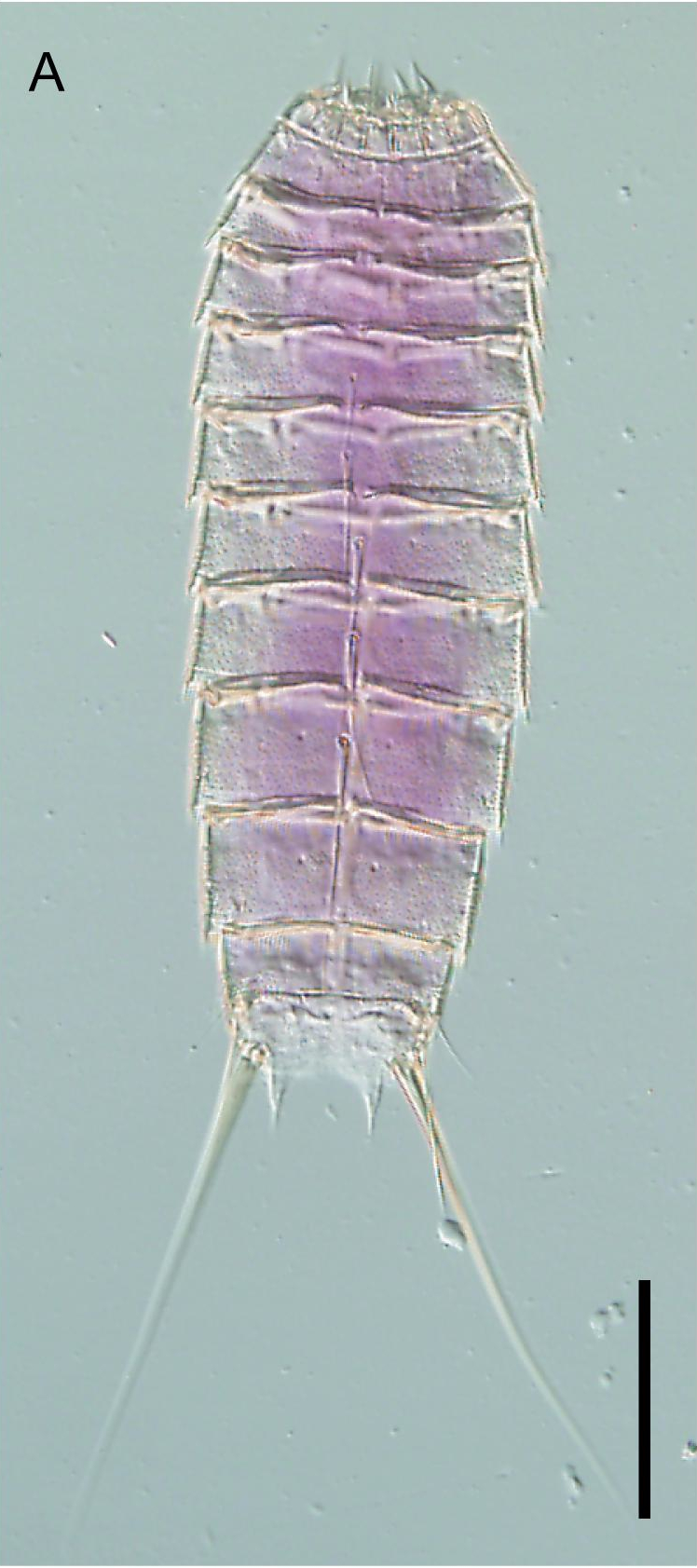
- Holotype female

Scientific classification
- Kingdom: Animalia
- Phylum: Kinorhyncha
- Class: Cyclorhagida
- Order: Echinorhagata
- Family: Echinoderidae
- Genus: Fissuroderes
- Species: F. cthulhu

Binomial name
- Fissuroderes cthulhu Cepeda et al 2020

= Fissuroderes cthulhu =

Species of marine invertebrate

Fissuroderes cthulhu is a species of mud dragon within the family Echinoderidae. It was described from the Mozambique Channel after an investigation of several ocean floor pockmarks. The species is possibly restricted to methane cold seeps off the coast of Madagascar. The species name cthulhu is in reference to H. P. Lovecraft's fictional deity Cthulhu.

== Description ==
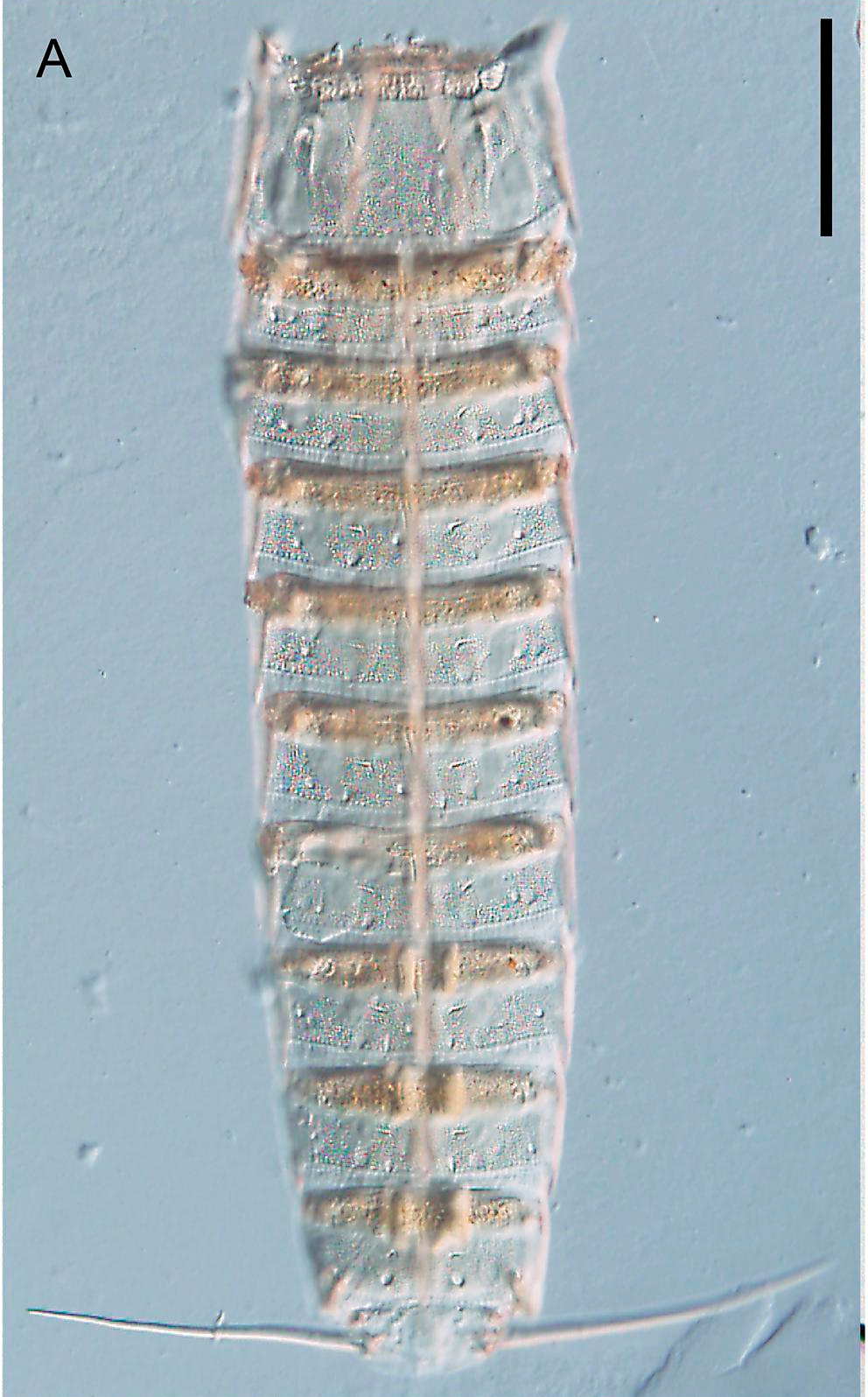
Fujuriphyes dagon

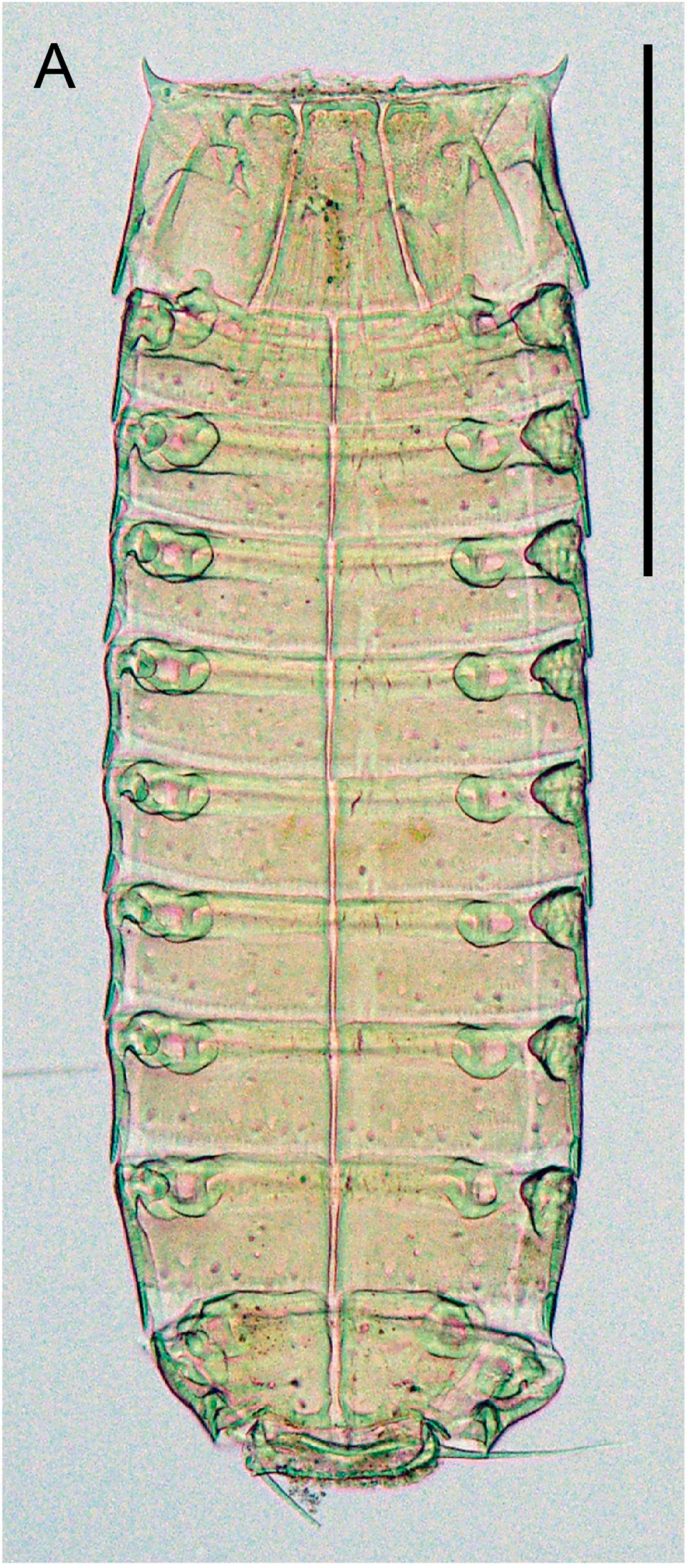
Fujuriphyes hydra

Other Betsiboka slope pockmark species

Fissuroderes cthulhu adults of both genders exhibit very similar body proportions with no distinct sexual dimorphic size change. Specimens range in length between 327.5 and 482.8μm, with a mean length of 391.3μm. The widest point of adults is on segment 6, with a sternal width between 77.0 and 84.0μm, and a mean width of 80.6μm. A series of middorsally placed spines are found from segments four through eight, while another series, placed lateroventrally are present from segments six to nine. With both sets of spines the spine length increases from frontmost to rearmost. The females have sexually dimorphic papillae positioned ventrolaterally on segment seven. Both sexes have a tergal plate and two sternal plates on segment 2.

== History and classification ==
Two separate survey and sampling voyages were conducted in Mozambique Channel. The research vessel R/V L'Atalante conducted the PAMELA-MOZ01 mission during October 2014, and the R/V Pourquoi pas? lead the PAMELA-MOZ04 campaign November and December 2015. Examination of the sea floor was conducted with both a deep towed camera Scampi and multibeam echosounders to locate potential survey sites between Mozambique and Madagascar. Four specific sites approximately 50 km (31 mi) off the mouth of Madagascars Betsiboka River were chosen. The sites on the Betsiboka slope were sampled ranging in depth from 735 m (2,411 ft) at the shallowest, though 754 m (2,474 ft) and 757 m (2,484 ft) to 789 m (2,589 ft) at the deepest. Of the four, two were non-pockmarks as baseline sampling locations while the other two were active seeps, one methane and one hydrogen sulfide and methane. Samples were recovered using a Barnett-type multi-corer outfitted with three coring devices which recovered a core 5 cm (2.0 in) long and an internal diameter of 6.2 cm (2.4 in).

Each sectioned sample was sieved and then washed to separate the meiofauna from the sediment. The fauna was then taxonomically sorted and the mud dragon specimens mounted for light microscopy on glass slides or aluminum stubs and gold coated for scanning electron microscopy. A type series comprising the holotype, NHMD 669727 female, and nine paratypes, "NHMD 669728–669736", were selected and added to the Natural History Museum of Denmark type collection. An additional specimen, not of the type series, was SEM mounted and reposited in the Complutense University of Madrid meiofauna collections. Based on the specimens, the research team led by biologist Diego Cepeda chose to describe the specimens as a new species, Fissuroderes cthulhu. They placed the new species into the genus Fissuroderes based on the females having ventral papillae as a sexually dimorphic character, and all specimens having a tergal plate and two sternal plates on segment 2.

Fissuroderes cthulhu was one of three new mud dragon species described by Cepeda et al, who also named Fujuriphyes dagon and Fujuriphyes hydra from in or near the explored pockmarks. As with F. cthulhu, the other two species were named in honor of Lovecraftian deities.

=== Etymology ===
Cepeda et al coined the species name "cthulhu" as a reference to the H. P. Lovecraft character. First appearing in The Call of Cthulhu, Cthulhu is a "Great Old One" in Lovecraft's Cthulhu Mythos, and described as a gigantic humanoid dragon with octopus like head found in the ocean-floor city of R'lyeh.

== Distribution and habitat ==
Fissuroderes cthulhu is native to deep sea cold seep pockmarks in the Mozambique Channel. The only identified population of F. cthulhu was found in pockmark MTB06 which formed within a methane cold seep. At the time of description the authors were unable to tell if F. cthulhu is a methane seep specialist or if it has a wider but unidentified range outside of the pockmarks.

== Ecology and behavior ==
Fissuroderes cthulhu is the second most common Kinorhynch in the MTB06 methane pockmark, accounting for 15% of the total adults. The most common species is Echinoderes unispinosus which made up 63.1% of the adults. The extremely reduced oxygen conditions and high concentrations of typically toxic methane is suggested to enable the Kinorhynch communities to grow and diversify with specialist species such as F. cthulhu evolving in the pockmarks. Chemosynthetic bacterial mats thriving on the methane and other hydrocarbon outputs in the pockmarks are thought to provide the main food for the kinorhynchs. However the community density is capped by the hydrogen sulfide concentration gradient that also results from the chemosynthesis. The community only flourishes with low to moderate hydrogen sulfide levels, which above a moderate level become toxic to even the adapted Kinorhynch species.
