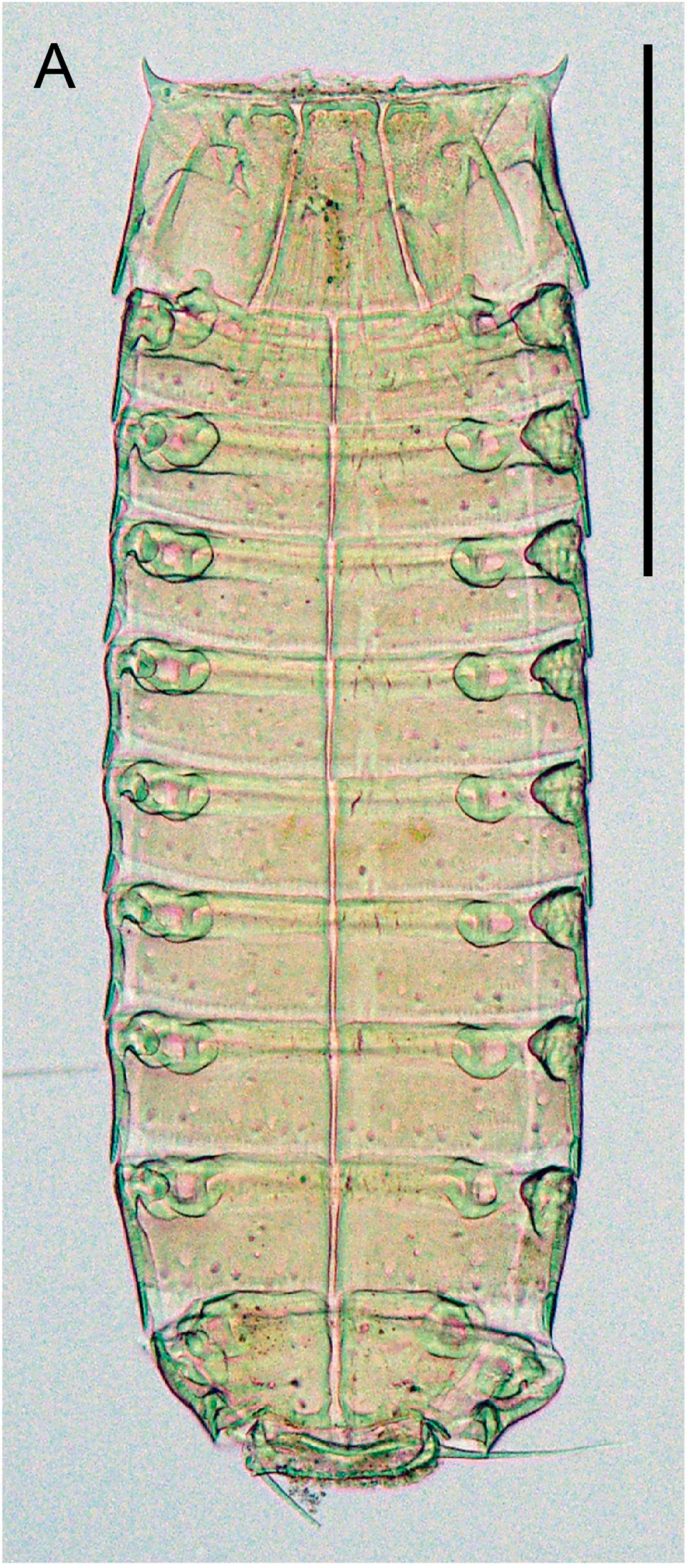
- Holotype female

Scientific classification
- Kingdom: Animalia
- Phylum: Kinorhyncha
- Class: Allomalorhagida
- Family: Pycnophyidae
- Genus: Fujuriphyes
- Species: F. hydra

Binomial name
- Fujuriphyes hydra Cepeda et al 2020

= Fujuriphyes hydra =

Species of marine invertebrate

Fujuriphyes hydra is a species of mud dragon within the family Pycnophyidae. It was described from the Mozambique Channel after an investigation of several ocean floor pockmarks. The species was only found in the seafloor sediments outside one methane cold seep off the coast of Madagascar. The species name hydra is in reference to H.P. Lovecraft's fictional deity Mother Hydra.

== Description ==
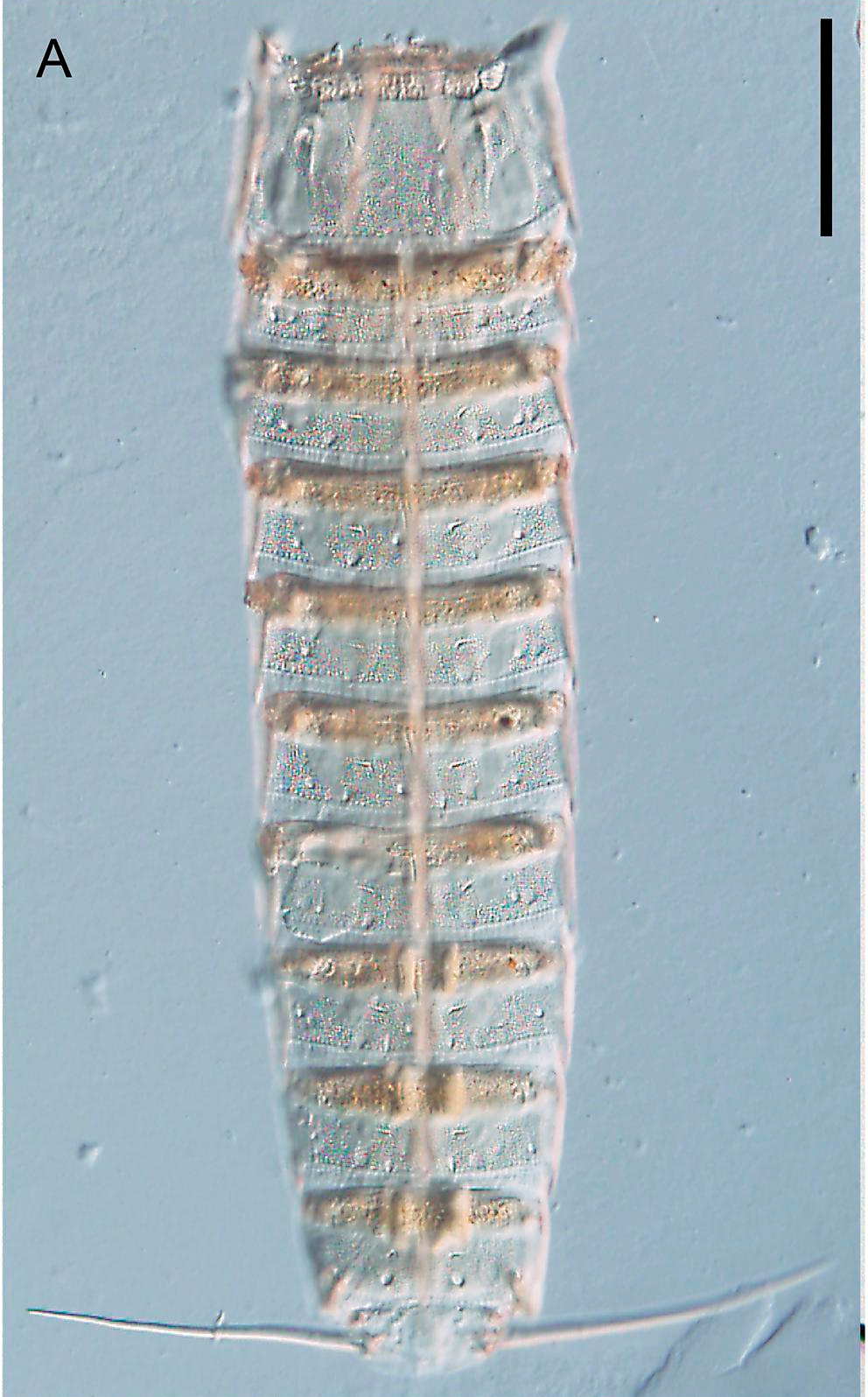
Fujuriphyes dagon

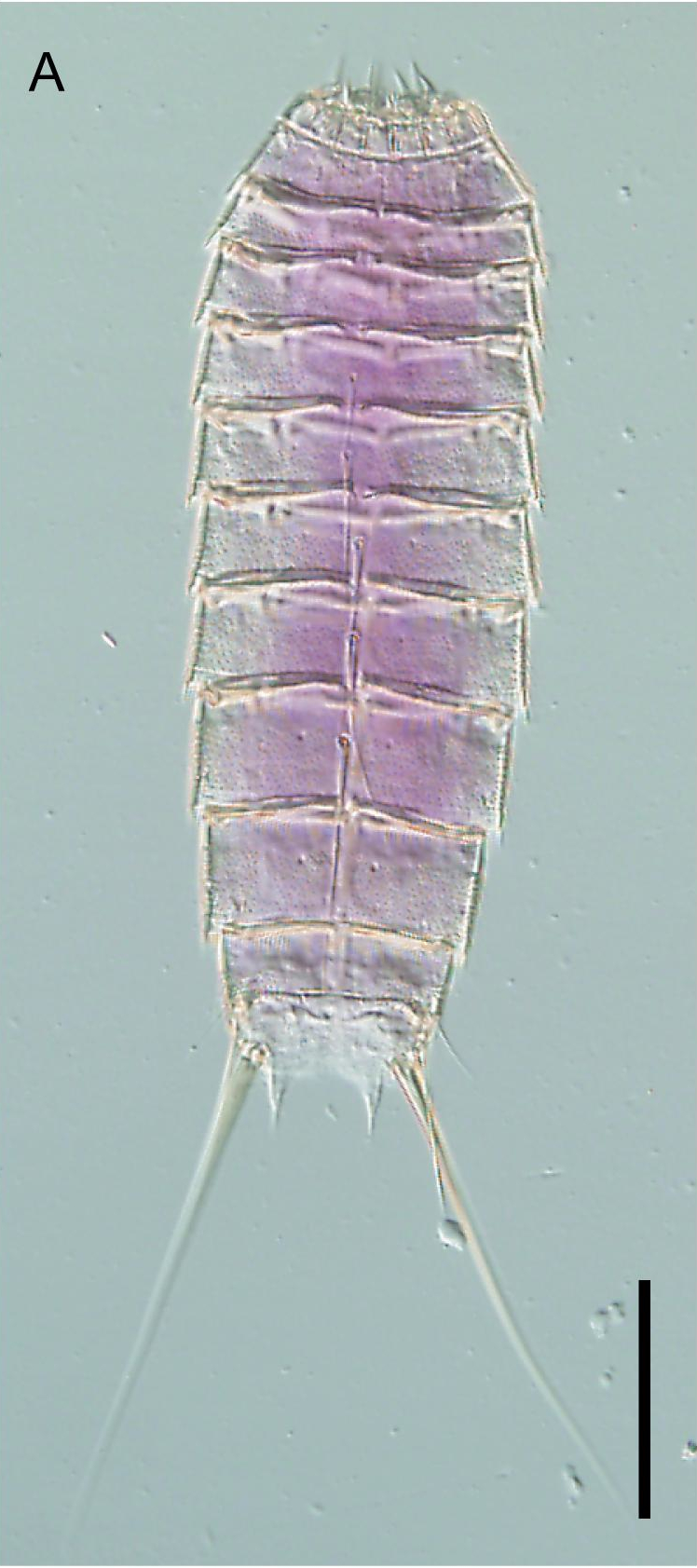
Fissuroderes cthulhu

Other Betsiboka slope pockmark species

Fujuriphyes hydra adults of both genders exhibit very similar body proportions with no distinct sexual dimorphic size change. Specimens range in length between 649.7 and 657.7 μm, with a mean length of 654.0 μm. The widest point of adults is on segment 6, with a sternal width between 179.4 and 270.7 μm, and a mean width of 215.6 μm. F. hydra as well as Fujuriphyes dagon have elongated lateral spines on terminal segment 11, distinguishing them from several Caribbean species. The length of the spines is between 201.7 and 202.2 μm, approximately 30% that of the full body length.

As with a number of other species, the body of F. hydra has a series of processes or elevations along the length of the body. F. hydra is distinguishable from other species in having the series of processes running from segment 1 all the way through segment 10, while in other species the segment count is smaller. The oral ring consists of nine stylets in a flexible single unit. The stylets each are cone shaped tapering upwards from base to tip. Males are distinguishable from females by having ventromedially placed tubes present on segment 2.

== History and classification ==
Two separate survey and sampling voyages were conducted in Mozambique Channel. The research vessel R/V L'Atalante conducted the PAMELA-MOZ01 mission during October 2014, and the R/V Pourquoi pas? lead the PAMELA-MOZ04 campaign November and December 2015. Examination of the sea floor was conducted with both a deep towed camera Scampi and multibeam echosounders to locate potential survey sites between Mozambique and Madagascar. Four specific sites approximately 50 km (31 mi) off the mouth of Madagascars Betsiboka River were chosen. The sites on the Betsiboka slope were sampled ranging in depth from 735 m (2,411 ft) at the shallowest, though 754 m (2,474 ft) and 757 m (2,484 ft) to 789 m (2,589 ft) at the deepest. Of the four, two were non-pockmarks as baseline sampling locations while the other two were active seeps, one methane and one hydrogen sulfide and methane. Samples were recovered using a Barnett-type multi-corer outfitted with three coring devices which recovered a core 5 cm (2.0 in) long and an internal diameter of 6.2 cm (2.4 in).

Each sectioned sample was sieved and then washed to separate the meiofauna from the sediment. The fauna was then taxonomically sorted and the kinorhynch specimens mounted for light microscopy on glass slides or aluminum stubs and gold coated for scanning electron microscopy. A type series comprising the holotype, NHMD 669762 female, and three paratypes, "NHMD 669767–669769", were selected and added to the Natural History Museum of Denmark type collection. Based on the specimens, the research team led by biologist Diego Cepeda chose to describe the specimens as a new species, Fujuriphyes dagon. They placed the new species into the genus Fujuriphyes based on the presence of ventrolateral setae on segment five, plus segments 3-9 which are missing setae placed ventromedially. The species also has characteristic long lateral terminal spines.

Fujuriphyes hydra was one of three new kinorhynch species described by Cepeda et al, who also named Fissuroderes cthulhu and Fujuriphyes dagon from in or near the explored pockmarks. As with F. cthulhu, the other two species were named in honor of Lovecraftian deities.

=== Etymology ===
Cepeda et al chose the species name "hydra" as a reference to the H. P. Lovecraft character first appearing in the 1936 The Shadow over Innsmouth short story. Lovecraft considered Hydra the consort of Father Dagon, ruler of the amphibious Deep Ones.

== Distribution and habitat ==
Fujuriphyes hydra is native to sediments around deep sea cold seep pockmarks in the Mozambique Channel. The only identified population of F. hydra was found outside pockmark MTB03 formed by a hydrocarbon cold seep. At the time of description the authors deemed F. hydra as a generalist mud dragon species unable to survive the reduced nutrient environment found within Methane cold seeps as F. dagon does.

== Ecology and behavior ==
Fujuriphyes hydra is an uncommon Kinorhynch species found outside of cold seep pockmark MTB03, and associated with Echinoderes apex, Echinoderes unispinosus and Ryuguderes casarrubiosi. Cepeda et al 2022 suggested the habitat area outside the pockmarks indicate the species are more generalist in biology, and not able to spend prolonged time within the hydrocarbon seep environment. While the area directly surrounding a pockmark may experience occasional overflow conditions out of a pockmark, the conditions are usually transitory and confined. The general population density of kinorhynchs around the pockmarks was considered low, and unlike in the pockmarks, it was most concentrated on the surface and not below the surface.
