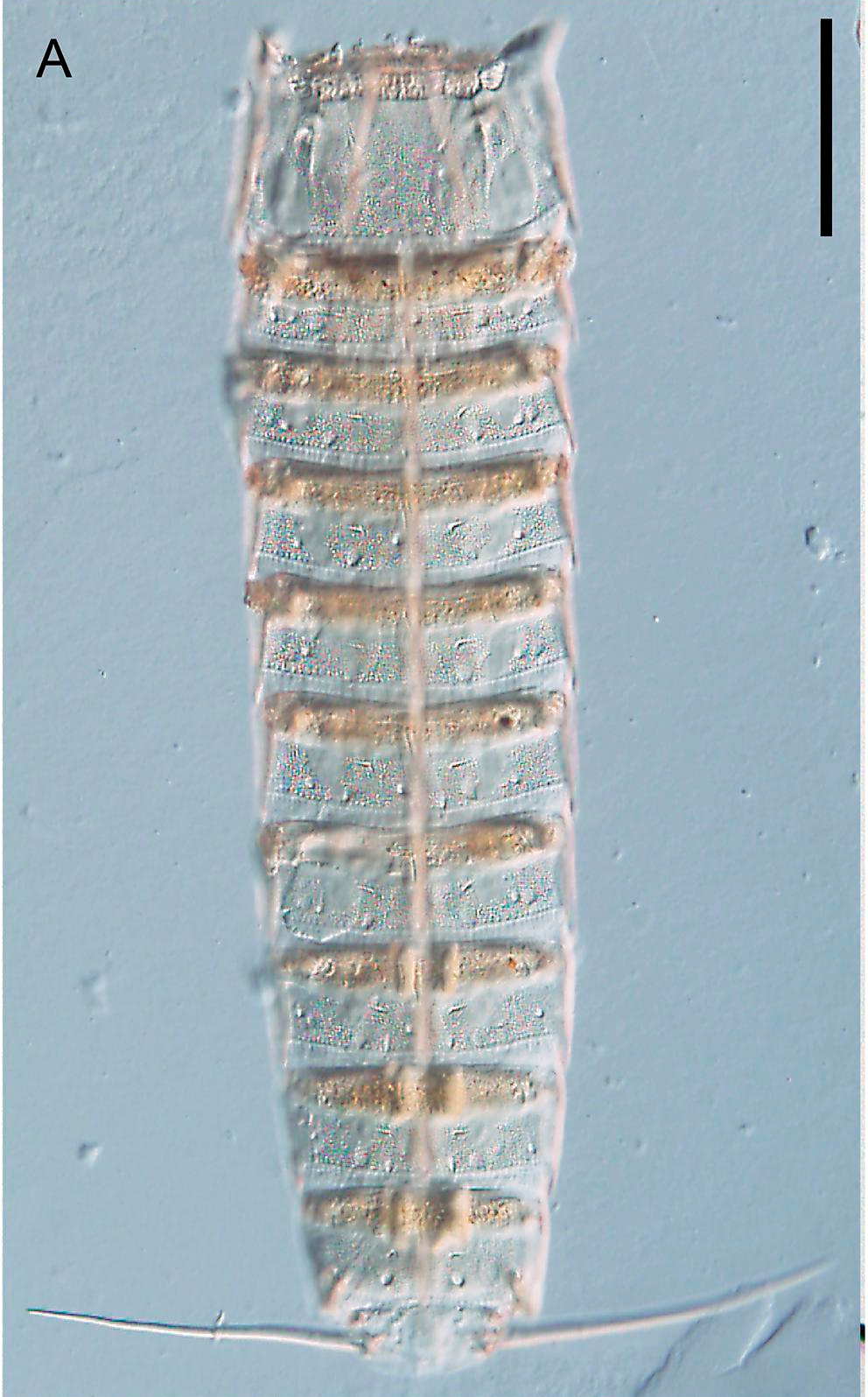
- Holotype female

Scientific classification
- Kingdom: Animalia
- Phylum: Kinorhyncha
- Class: Allomalorhagida
- Family: Pycnophyidae
- Genus: Fujuriphyes
- Species: F. dagon

Binomial name
- Fujuriphyes dagon Cepeda et al 2020

= Fujuriphyes dagon =

Species of marine invertebrate

Fujuriphyes dagon is a species of mud dragon within the family Pycnophyidae. It was described from the Mozambique Channel after an investigation of several ocean floor pockmarks. The species is possibly restricted to methane cold seeps off the coast of Madagascar. The species name dagon is in reference to H.P. Lovecraft's fictional deity Dagon.

== Description ==
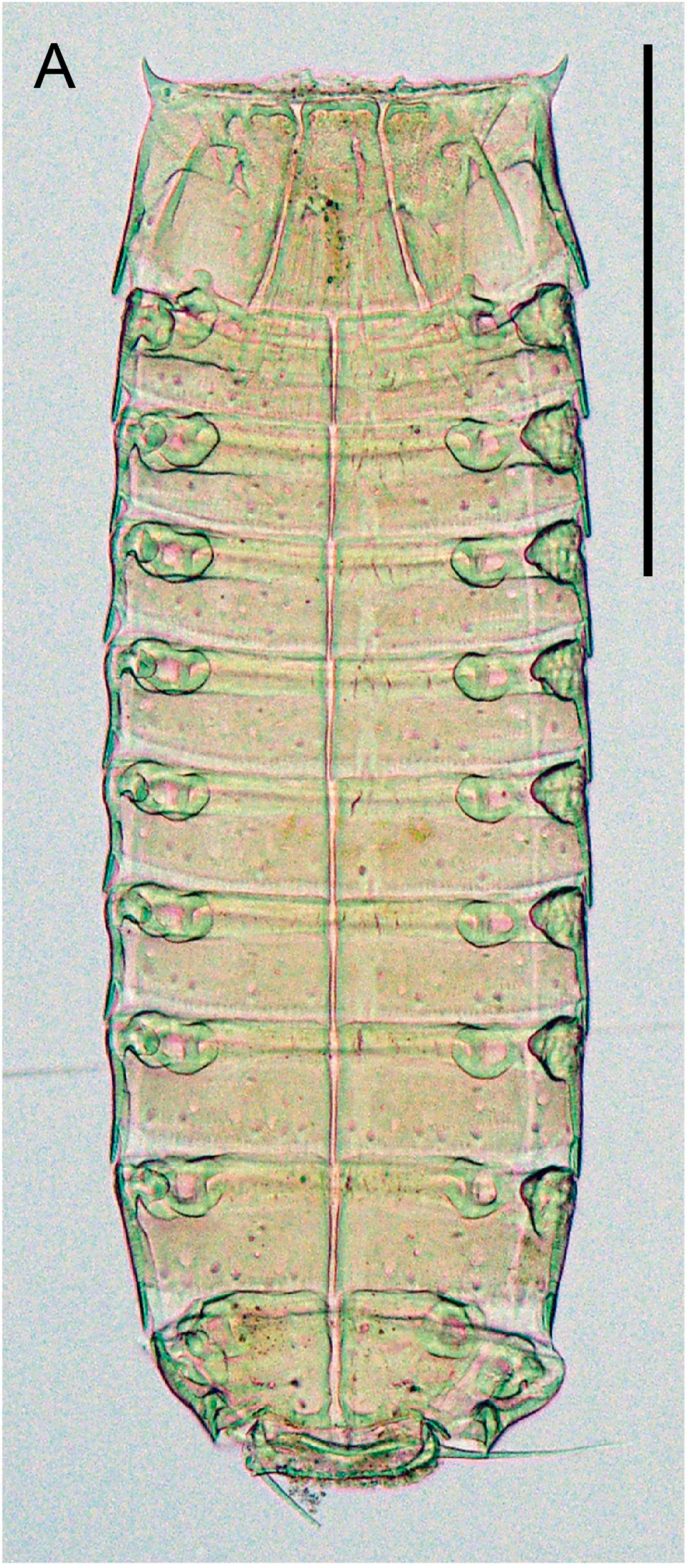
Fujuriphyes hydra

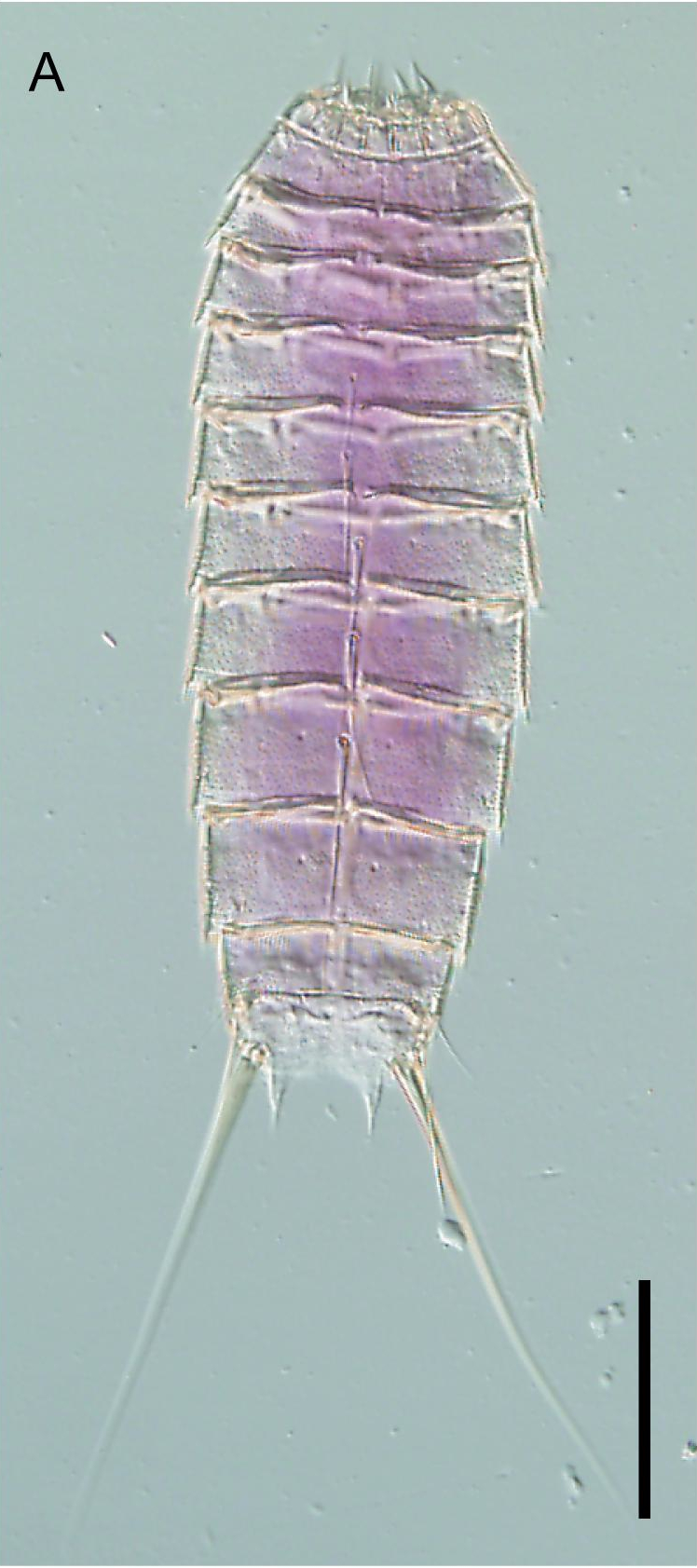
Fissuroderes cthulhu

Other Betsiboka slope pockmark species

Fujuriphyes dagon adults of both genders exhibit very similar body proportions with no distinct sexual dimorphic size change. Specimens range in length between 586.3-648.1 μm, with a mean length of 611.2 μm. The widest point of adults is on segment 6, with a sternal width between 129.7-146.5 μm, and a mean width of 144.3 μm. F. dagon as well as Fujuriphyes hydra have elongated lateral spines on terminal segment 11, distinguishing them from several Caribbean species. The length of the spines is between 183.3-194.9 μm, approximately 30% that of the full body length. As seen in only one other species, Fujuriphyes dalii the body of F. dagon is lacking sculpturing like processes or elevations along the length of the body. The two are distinguishable by the patterns of seta placement between the two, with F. dagon having unpaired seta on the sides of segments 2, 4, 6, and 8. The oral ring consists of nine stylets in a flexible single unit. The stylets each are cone shaped tapering upwards from base to tip. Males are distinguishable from females by having ventromedially placed tubes present on segment 2.

== History and classification ==
Two separate survey and sampling voyages were conducted in Mozambique Channel. The research vessel R/V L'Atalante conducted the PAMELA-MOZ01 mission during October 2014, and the R/V Pourquoi pas? lead the PAMELA-MOZ04 campaign November and December 2015. Examination of the sea floor was conducted with both a deep towed camera Scampi and multibeam echosounders to locate potential survey sites between Mozambique and Madagascar. Four specific sites approximately 50 km (31 mi) off the mouth of Madagascars Betsiboka River were chosen. The sites on the Betsiboka slope were sampled ranging in depth from 735 m (2,411 ft) at the shallowest, though 754 m (2,474 ft) and 757 m (2,484 ft) to 789 m (2,589 ft) at the deepest. Of the four, two were non-pockmarks as baseline sampling locations while the other two were active seeps, one methane and one hydroden sulfide and methane. Samples were recovered using a Barnett-type multi-corer outfitted with three coring devices which recovered a core 5 cm (2.0 in) long and an internal diameter of 6.2 cm (2.4 in).

Each sectioned sample was sieved and then washed to separate the meiofauna from the sediment. The fauna was then taxonomically sorted and the kinorhynch specimens mounted for light microscopy on glass slides or aluminum stubs and gold coated for scanning electron microscopy. A type series comprising the holotype, NHMD 669766 female, and three paratypes, "NHMD 669763–669765", were selected and added to the Natural History Museum of Denmark type collection. Two additional specimens, not of the type series, were SEM mounted and reposited in the Complutense University of Madrid meiofauna collections. Based on the specimens, the research team led by biologist Diego Cepeda chose to described the specimens as a new mud dragon species, Fujuriphyes dagon. They placed the new species into the genus Fujuriphyes based on the presence of ventrolateral setae on segment five, plus segments 3-9 which are missing setae placed ventromedially. The species also has characteristic long lateral terminal spines.

Fujuriphyes dagon was one of three new mud dragon species described by Cepeda et al, who also named Fissuroderes cthulhu and Fujuriphyes hydra from in or near the explored pockmarks. As with F. cthulhu, the other two species were named in honor of Lovecraftian deities.

=== Etymology ===
Cepeda et al chose the species name "dagon" as a reference to the H. P. Lovecraft character first appearing in the 1919 Dagon short story, and later called Father Dagon in The Shadow over Innsmouth. Lovecraft considered Dagon the husband of Mother Hydra and ruler of the amphibious Deep Ones.

== Distribution and habitat ==
Fujuriphyes dagon is native to deep sea cold seep pockmarks in the Mozambique Channel. The only identified population of F. dagon was found in pockmark MTB06 which formed within a methane cold seep. At the time of description the authors were unable to tell if F. dagon is a methane seep specialist or if it has a wider but unidentified range outside of the pockmarks.

== Ecology and behavior ==
Fujuriphyes dagon is an uncommon Kinorhynch species in the MTB06 methane pockmark, accounting for only about 6.6% of the total adults. The most common species is Echinoderes unispinosus which made up 63.1% of the adults, followed by Fissuroderes cthulhu at 15%. The extremely reduced oxygen conditions and high concentrations of typically toxic methane is suggested to enable the Kinorhynch communities to grow and diversify with specialist species such as F. dagon evolving in the pockmarks. Chemosynthetic bacterial mats thriving on the methane and other hydrocarbon outputs in the pockmarks are thought to provide the main food for the kinorhynchs. However the community density is capped by the hydrogen sulfide concentration gradient that also results from the chemosynthesis. The community only flourishes with low to moderate hydrogen sulfide levels, which above a moderate level become toxic to even the adapted Kinorhynch species.
