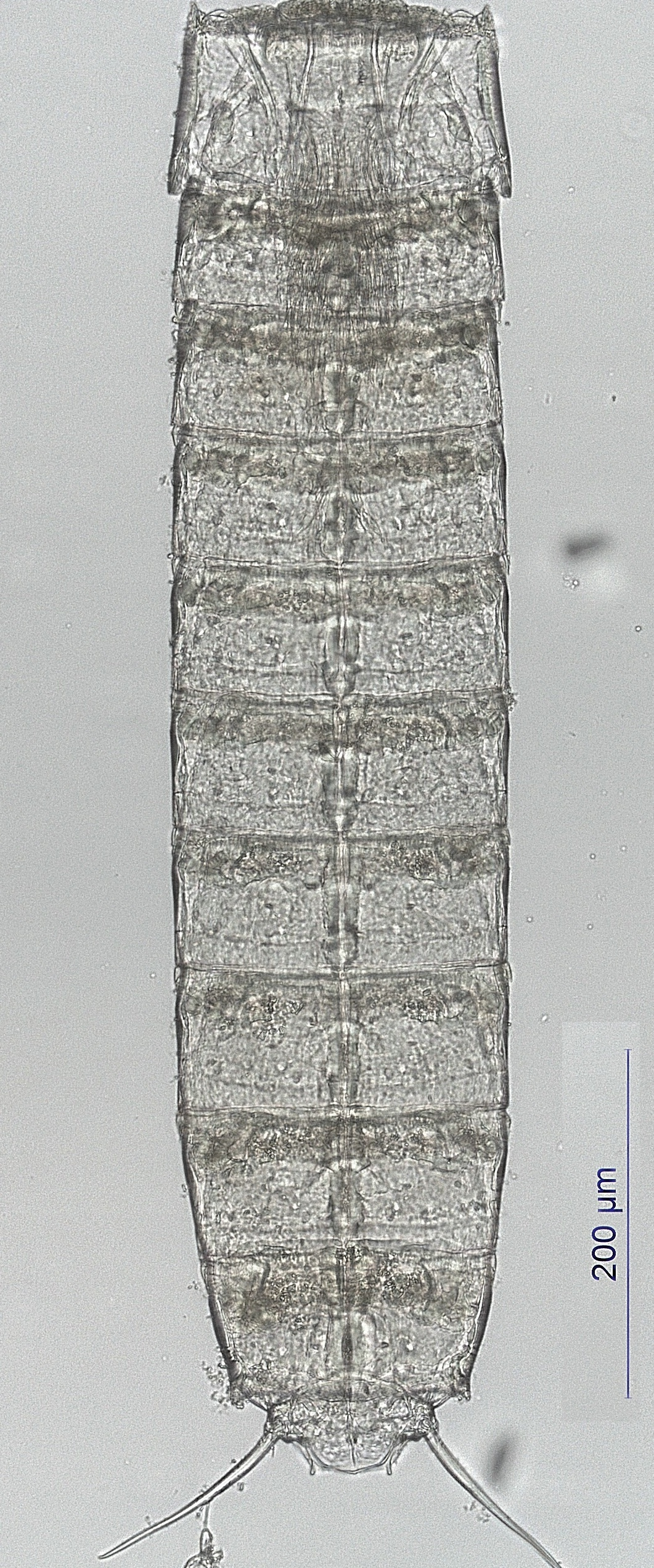

Scientific classification
- Domain: Eukaryota
- Kingdom: Animalia
- Phylum: Kinorhyncha
- Class: Allomalorhagida
- Family: Pycnophyidae
- Genus: Pycnophyes
- Species: P. zelinkaei

Binomial name
- Pycnophyes zelinkaei Southern, 1914

Synonyms
- Pycnophyes zelinkae Southern, 1914

= Pycnophyes zelinkaei =

Species of seed-bearing plant

Pycnophyes zelinkaei, is a species of mud dragon in the family Pycnophyidae. The species is found in the North Sea.
