= Echinoderes obtuspinosus =

Scientific classification
- Domain: Eukaryota
- Kingdom: Animalia
- Phylum: Kinorhyncha
- Class: Cyclorhagida
- Order: Echinorhagata
- Family: Echinoderidae
- Genus: Echinoderes
- Species: E. obtuspinosus

Binomial name
- Echinoderes obtuspinosus Sørensen et al., 2012

Species of small marine invertebrate

Echinoderes obtuspinosus is a species of mud dragons first found in coastal and subtidal locations around the Korean Peninsula and in the East China Sea.
