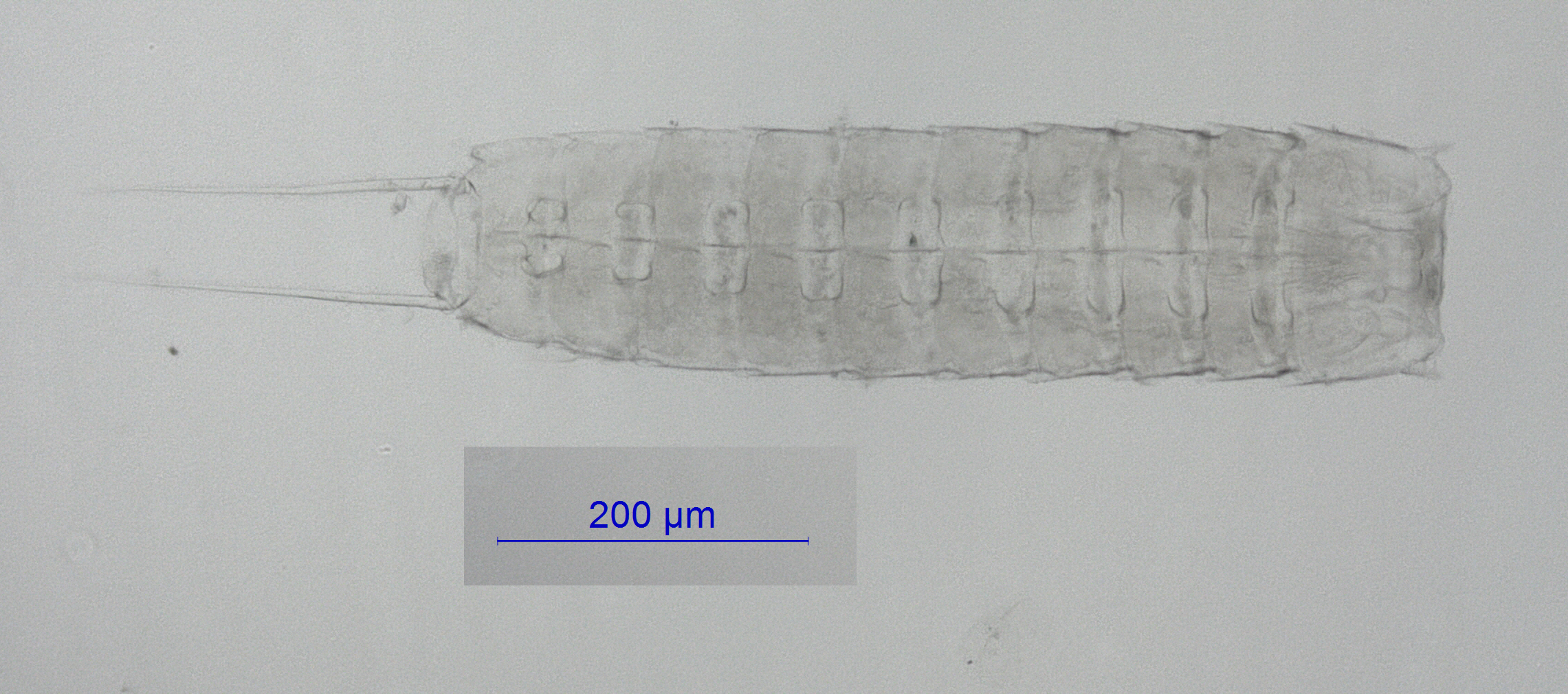

Scientific classification
- Domain: Eukaryota
- Kingdom: Animalia
- Phylum: Kinorhyncha
- Class: Allomalorhagida
- Family: Pycnophyidae
- Genus: Pycnophyes
- Species: P. robustus

Binomial name
- Pycnophyes robustus Zelinka, 1928

= Pycnophyes robustus =

Species of mud dragon

Pycnophyes robustus is a species of mud dragon within the family Pycnophyidae. The species is found distributed in the Mediterranean Sea and waters of Norway, with specimens from Norway coming from waters off coasts of Møre og Romsdal near Ålvund, Øksendal, Sunndalsøra, Eidsvåg, and Batnfjordsøra, as well as off coasts of Vestland in the Raunefjorden strait. Specimens from the Mediterranean include Portugal in the Regueira dos Barcos estuary off Moncarapacho and Spain off the coasts of Blanes.
