= Setaphyes =

Scientific classification
- Domain: Eukaryota
- Kingdom: Animalia
- Phylum: Kinorhyncha
- Class: Allomalorhagida
- Family: Pycnophyidae
- Genus: Setaphyes; Sánchez, Yamasaki, Pardos, Sørensen & Martínez, 2016

Genus of small marine invertebrates

Setaphyes is a genus of kinorhynchs belonging to the family Pycnophyidae. Currently the genus comprises eight species with the most recently described being Setaphyes algarvensis identified in 2022.

== Species ==
- Setaphyes algarvensis González-Casarrubios, Cepeda, Pardos, Neves & Sánchez, 2022
- Setaphyes australensis (Lemburg, 2002) Sánchez, Yamasaki, Pardos, Sørensen & Martínez, 2016
- Setaphyes cimarensis Sánchez, García-Herrero, García-Gómez & Pardos, 2018
- Setaphyes dentatus (Reinhard, 1881) Sánchez, Yamasaki, Pardos, Sørensen & Martínez, 2016
- Setaphyes elenae Cepeda, González-Casarrubios, Sánchez & Pardos, 2020
- Setaphyes flaveolatus (Zelinka, 1908) Sánchez, Yamasaki, Pardos, Sørensen & Martínez, 2016
- Setaphyes iniorhaptus (Higgins, 1983) Sánchez, Yamasaki, Pardos, Sørensen & Martínez, 2016
- Setaphyes kielensis (Zelinka, 1928) Sánchez, Yamasaki, Pardos, Sørensen & Martínez, 2016
