= Fujuriphyes =

Scientific classification
- Kingdom: Animalia
- Phylum: Kinorhyncha
- Class: Allomalorhagida
- Family: Pycnophyidae
- Genus: Fujuriphyes; Sánchez, Yamasaki, Pardos, Sørensen & Martínez, 2016

Genus of marine invertebrates

Fujuriphyes is a genus of kinorhynchs within the family Pycnophyidae, with 9 species currently assigned to the genus.

It is named after the luckdragon Falkor (Fuchur in the original German) from Michael Ende's novel The Neverending Story; the character was named Fujur in the Spanish translation of the book, and the lead author of the taxon is Spanish. It was noted that "The name adds to the list of kinorhynch (mud dragons) species named after dragons and also refers to the study of kinorhynch phylogeny as a "never-ending story"."

== Species ==
- Fujuriphyes dagon Cepeda, Pardos, Zeppilli & Sánchez, 2020
- Fujuriphyes dalii Cepeda, Sánchez & Pardos, 2019
- Fujuriphyes deirophorus (Higgins, 1983) Sánchez, Yamasaki, Pardos, Sørensen & Martínez, 2016
- Fujuriphyes distentus (Higgins, 1983) Sánchez, Yamasaki, Pardos, Sørensen & Martínez, 2016
- Fujuriphyes hydra Cepeda, Pardos, Zeppilli & Sánchez, 2020
- Fujuriphyes longispinosus Sánchez & Yamasaki, 2016
- Fujuriphyes ponticus (Reinhard, 1881) Sánchez, Yamasaki, Pardos, Sørensen & Martínez, 2016
- Fujuriphyes rugosus (Zelinka, 1928) Sánchez, Yamasaki, Pardos, Sørensen & Martínez, 2016
- Fujuriphyes viserioni Sánchez, Sørensen & Landers, 2019
