= Antygomonas paulae =

Scientific classification
- Domain: Eukaryota
- Kingdom: Animalia
- Phylum: Kinorhyncha
- Class: Cyclorhagida
- Order: Kentrorhagata
- Family: Antygomonidae
- Genus: Antygomonas
- Species: A. paulae

Binomial name
- Antygomonas paulae Sørensen, 2007

Species of small marine invertebrate

Antygomonas paulae is a species of Antygomonas found in the Atlantic.
