= Polacanthoderes =

Scientific classification
- Kingdom: Animalia
- Phylum: Kinorhyncha
- Class: Cyclorhagida
- Order: Echinorhagata
- Family: Echinoderidae
- Genus: Polacanthoderes; Sørensen, 2008
- Species: P. martinezi

Binomial name
- Polacanthoderes martinezi Sørensen, 2008

Genus of small marine invertebrates

Polacanthoderes is a genus of kinorhynchs in the family Echinoderidae. It consists of one species, Polacanthoderes martinezi Sørensen, 2008.
