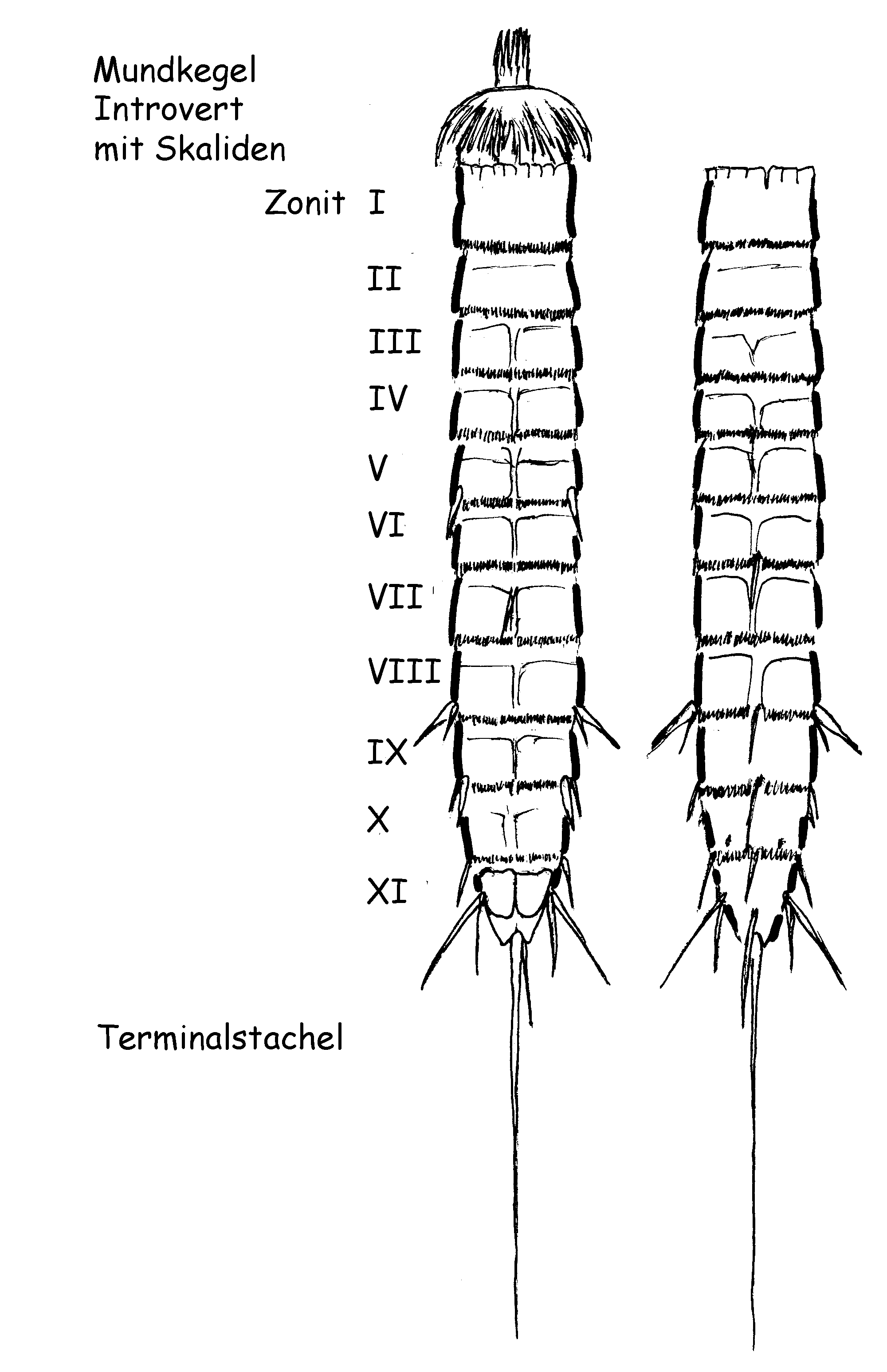
- Zelinkaderes floridensis

Scientific classification
- Domain: Eukaryota
- Kingdom: Animalia
- Phylum: Kinorhyncha
- Class: Cyclorhagida
- Order: Kentrorhagata
- Family: Zelinkaderidae
- Genus: Zelinkaderes; Higgins, 1990

= Zelinkaderes =

Genus of small marine invertebrates

Zelinkaderes is a genus of worms belonging to the family Zelinkaderidae.

The species of this genus are found in North America, Japan.

Species:

- Zelinkaderes brightae Sørensen, Heiner, Ziemer & Neuhaus, 2007
- Zelinkaderes floridensis Higgins, 1990
- Zelinkaderes klepali Bauer-Nebelsick, 1995
- Zelinkaderes submersus (Gerlach, 1969)
- Zelinkaderes yong Altenburger, Rho, Chang & Sørensen, 2015
