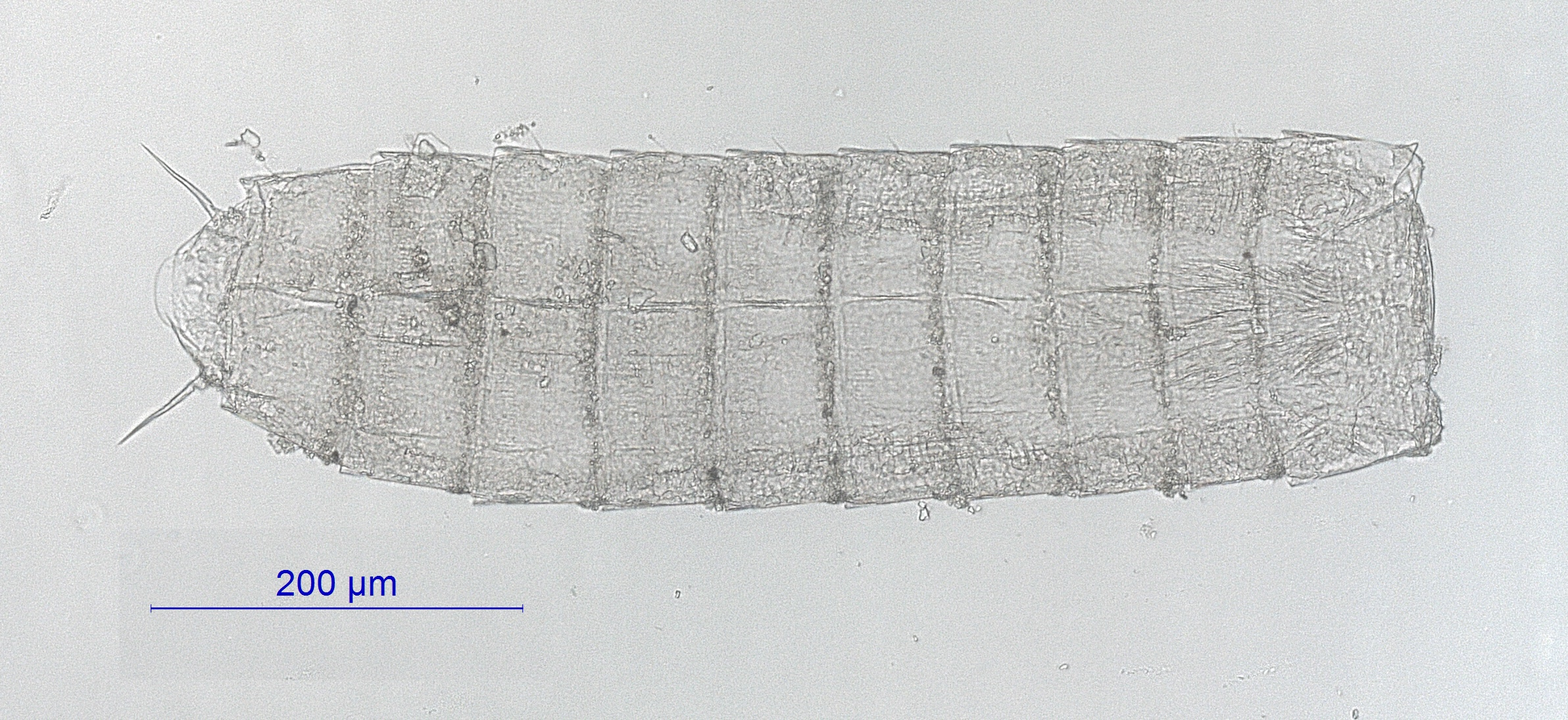
- Pycnophyes kielensis

Scientific classification
- Domain: Eukaryota
- Kingdom: Animalia
- Phylum: Kinorhyncha
- Class: Allomalorhagida
- Family: Pycnophyidae
- Genus: Pycnophyes; Zelinka, 1907

= Pycnophyes =

Genus of kinorhynchans

Pycnophyes is a genus of mud dragons belonging to the family Pycnophyidae.

The genus has cosmopolitan distribution.

Species:

- Pycnophyes alexandroi Pardos, Sánchez & Herranz, 2016
- Pycnophyes almansae Sánchez, Herranz, Benito & Pardos, 2014
- Pycnophyes ancalagon Sørensen & Grzelak, 2018
- Pycnophyes apotomus (Higgins, 1983) Sánchez, Yamasaki, Pardos, Sørensen & Martínez, 2016
- Pycnophyes aulacodes Sánchez, Pardos, Herranz & Benito, 2011
- Pycnophyes beaufortensis Higgins, 1964
- Pycnophyes biserratus (Zelinka, 1928)
- Pycnophyes chiliensis Lang, 1953
- Pycnophyes communis Zelinka, 1908
- Pycnophyes conspicuus (Zelinka, 1928)
- Pycnophyes curvatus (Zelinka, 1928)
- Pycnophyes denticulatus (Zelinka, 1928)
- Pycnophyes diffusus (Zelinka, 1928)
- Pycnophyes echinoderoides Zelinka, 1928
- Pycnophyes egyptensis Higgins, 1966
- Pycnophyes frequens Blake, 1930
- Pycnophyes giganteus (Zelinka, 1908) Sánchez, Yamasaki, Pardos, Sørensen & Martínez, 2016
- Pycnophyes ilyocryptus (Higgins, 1961) Sánchez, Yamasaki, Pardos, Sørensen & Martínez, 2016
- Pycnophyes kukulkan Sánchez & Martínez, 2019
- Pycnophyes longihastatus (Zelinka, 1928)
- Pycnophyes longisetosus (Zelinka, 1928)
- Pycnophyes moderatus (Zelinka, 1928)
- Pycnophyes naviculus (Zelinka, 1928)
- Pycnophyes neuhausi Higgins, 2004, 2004
- Pycnophyes newguiniensis Adrianov, 1999, 1999
- Pycnophyes newzealandiensis Adrianov, 1999, 1999
- Pycnophyes norenburgi Herranz, Sánchez, Pardos & Higgins, 2014
- Pycnophyes oshoroensis Yamasaki, Kajihara & Mawatari, 2012
- Pycnophyes paraneapolitanus (Sheremetevskij, 1974) Sánchez, Yamasaki, Pardos, Sørensen & Martínez, 2016
- Pycnophyes parasanjuanensis Adrianov & Higgins, 1996
- Pycnophyes rectilineatus (Zelinka, 1928)
- Pycnophyes robustus Zelinka, 1928
- Pycnophyes sanjuanensis Higgins, 1961
- Pycnophyes schornikovi Adrianov, 1999, 1999
- Pycnophyes solidus (Zelinka, 1928)
- Pycnophyes stenopygus (Higgins, 1983) Sánchez, Yamasaki, Pardos, Sørensen & Martínez, 2016
- Pycnophyes tenuis (Zelinka, 1928)
- Pycnophyes tubuliferus Adrianov, 1989
- Pycnophyes validus (Zelinka, 1928)
- Pycnophyes zelinkaei Southern, 1914
