= Antygomonas incomitata =

Scientific classification
- Domain: Eukaryota
- Kingdom: Animalia
- Phylum: Kinorhyncha
- Class: Cyclorhagida
- Order: Kentrorhagata
- Family: Antygomonidae
- Genus: Antygomonas
- Species: A. incomitata

Binomial name
- Antygomonas incomitata Nebelsick 1990

Species of small marine invertebrate

Antygomonas incomitata is a species of kinorhycha. This particular species was found in the Bay of Vestar.
