= Cateria gerlachi =

Scientific classification
- Kingdom: Animalia
- Phylum: Kinorhyncha
- Class: Cyclorhagida
- Order: Kentrorhagata
- Family: Cateriidae
- Genus: Cateria
- Species: C. gerlachi

Binomial name
- Cateria gerlachi Higgins, 1968

Species of mud dragon

Cateria gerlachi is a species of mud dragon within the family Cateriidae. The species was redescribed off dozens of specimens caught off the west coasts of Sri Lanka. In addition to Sri Lanka, the species also occurs in eastern India in sandy intertidal habitats both at the surface and deeply buried in sediment. C. gerlachi was named after professor Dr. S. A. Gerlach who described the first species in the Cateria genus.
