= Paracentrophyes =

Scientific classification
- Kingdom: Animalia
- Phylum: Kinorhyncha
- Class: Allomalorhagida
- Family: Neocentrophyidae
- Genus: Paracentrophyes; Higgins, 1983

Genus of kinorhynchans

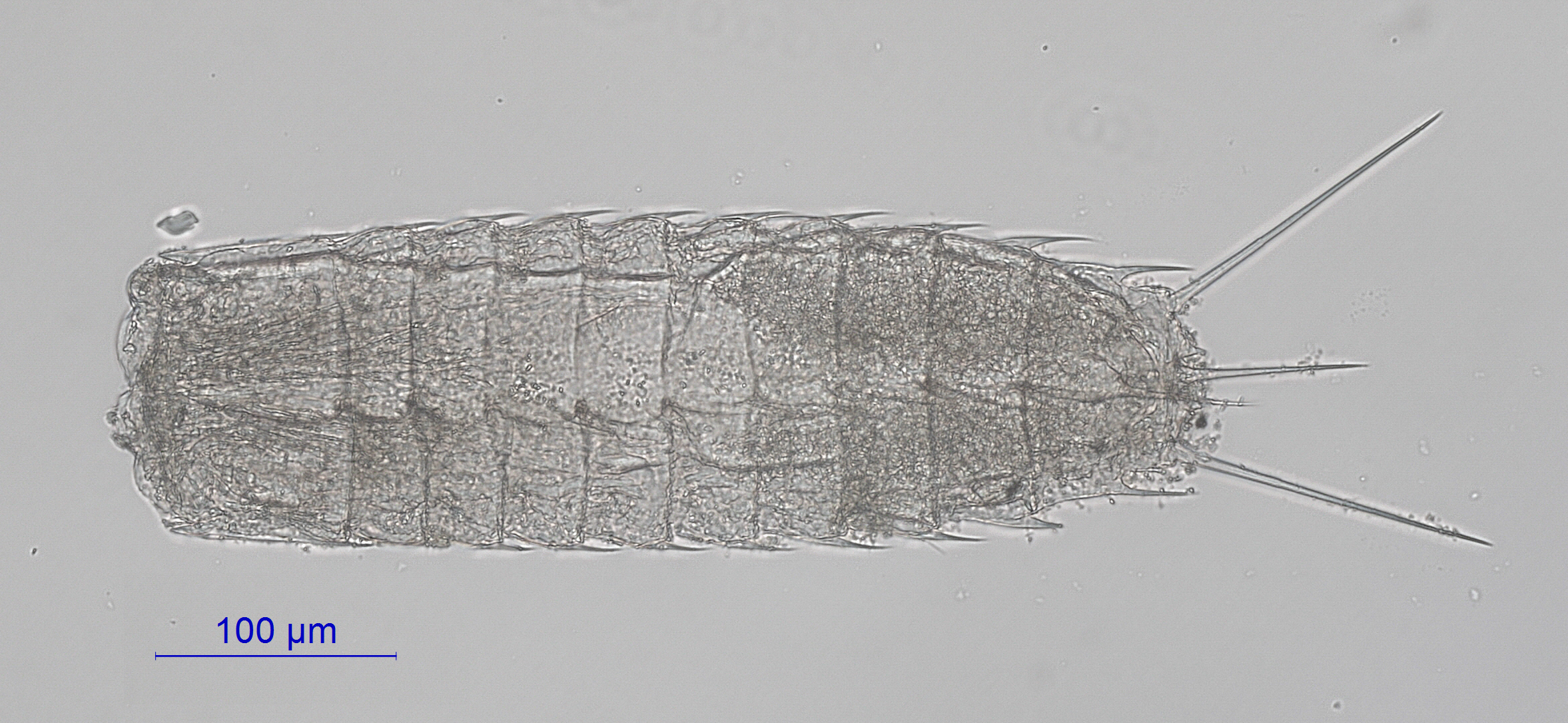
Paracentrophyes quadridenta

Paracentrophyes is a genus of worms belonging to the family Neocentrophyidae.

The species of this genus are found in Europe, North America.

Species:

- Paracentrophyes anurus Sørensen, Pardos, Herranz & Rho, 2010
- Paracentrophyes praedictus Higgins, 1983
- Paracentrophyes quadridentatus (Zelinka, 1928)
- Paracentrophyes sanchezae Sørensen & Landers, 2017
