= Meristoderes =

Scientific classification
- Kingdom: Animalia
- Phylum: Kinorhyncha
- Class: Cyclorhagida
- Order: Echinorhagata
- Family: Echinoderidae
- Genus: Meristoderes; Herranz, Thormar, Benito, Sánchez & Pardos, 2012

Genus of small marine invertebrates

Meristoderes is a genus of kinorhynchs in the family Echinoderidae.

== Species ==
- Meristoderes elleae Sørensen, Rho, Min, Kim & Chang, 2013
- Meristoderes galatheae Herranz, Thormar, Benito, Sánchez & Pardos, 2012
- Meristoderes glaber Sørensen, Rho, Min, Kim & Chang, 2013
- Meristoderes herranzae Sørensen, Rho, Min, Kim & Chang, 2013
- Meristoderes imugi Sørensen, Rho, Min, Kim & Chang, 2013
- Meristoderes macracanthus Herranz, Thormar, Benito, Sánchez & Pardos, 2012
