= Fissuroderes =

Scientific classification
- Kingdom: Animalia
- Phylum: Kinorhyncha
- Class: Cyclorhagida
- Order: Echinorhagata
- Family: Echinoderidae
- Genus: Fissuroderes; Neuhaus & Blasche, 2006

Genus of small marine invertebrates

Fissuroderes is a genus of kinorhynchs in the family Echinoderidae.

== Species ==
- Fissuroderes cthulhu Cepeda, Pardos, Zeppilli & Sánchez, 2020
- Fissuroderes higginsi Neuhaus & Blasche, 2006
- Fissuroderes novaezealandia Neuhaus & Blasche, 2006
- Fissuroderes papai Neuhaus & Blasche, 2006
- Fissuroderes rangi Neuhaus & Blasche, 2006
- Fissuroderes thermoi Neuhaus & Blasche, 2006
