= Cephalorhyncha (genus) =

Scientific classification
- Kingdom: Animalia
- Phylum: Kinorhyncha
- Class: Cyclorhagida
- Order: Echinorhagata
- Family: Echinoderidae
- Genus: Cephalorhyncha; Adrianov & Malakhov, 1999

Genus of small marine invertebrates

Cephalorhyncha is a genus of kinorhynchs in the family Echinoderidae.

== Species ==
- Cephalorhyncha asiatica (Adrianov, 1989)
- Cephalorhyncha liticola Sørensen, 2008
- Cephalorhyncha nybakkeni (Higgins, 1986)
