= Pockmark =

Pockmark may refer to:

- Acne scarring
- Scarring from chicken pox
- The scarring of smallpox
- Pockmark (geology)—a geological formation

== See also ==
- Pimple
