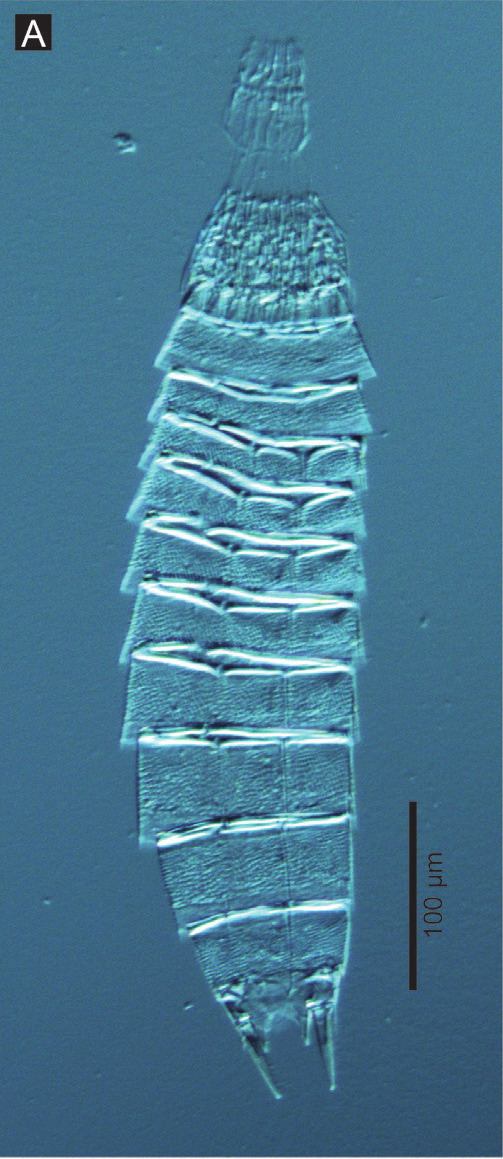
- Echinoderes hwiizaa

Scientific classification
- Kingdom: Animalia
- Phylum: Kinorhyncha
- Class: Cyclorhagida
- Order: Echinorhagata
- Family: Echinoderidae
- Genus: Echinoderes; Claparède, 1863

Species
- See text

Synonyms
- Echinoderella

= Echinoderes =

Genus of small marine invertebrates

Echinoderes is a genus of mud dragons first described in 1863. It is the largest genus within the phylum Kinorhyncha. It is a highly diverse genus, with member species that inhabit "most marine benthic substrates, on latitudes ranging from the Arctic to the tropics, and from the intertidal zone down to the deep sea." Species on the east coasts of North and South America have been extensively studied by Robert P. Higgins. Species in east Asia have been extensively studied by A. V. Adrianov.

Members of Echinoderes are sexually dimorphic.

Globally Echinoderes are the most diverse, abundant and commonly encountered of all kinorhynch genera. The number of described Echinoderes species has more than doubled since 2002 and it is still increasing in recent years.

Five genera, Echinoderes, Cephalorhyncha, Fissuroderes, Meristoderes, and Polacanthoderes, are currently recognized within the family Echinoderidae. The latter four genera are rather small and accommodate one to nine species only, whereas a vast majority of the diversity is contained in the Echinoderes, that holds more than 100 species.

== Species ==
76 species are accepted within Echinoderes:

- Echinoderes abbreviates Higgins, 1983
- Echinoderes agigens Bacescu, 1968
- Echinoderes andamanensis Higgins & Rao, 1979
- Echinoderes angustus Higgins & Kristensen, 1988
- Echinoderes applicitus Ostmann, Nordhaus & Sørensen, 2012
- Echinoderes aquilonius Higgins & Kristensen, 1988
- Echinoderes arlis Higgins, 1966
- Echinoderes aspinosus Sørensen, Rho, Min, Kim & Chang, 2012
- Echinoderes augustae Sørensen & Landers, 2014
- Echinoderes aureus Adrianov, Murakami & Shirayama, 2002
- Echinoderes bengalensis (Timm, 1958)
- Echinoderes bermudensis Higgins, 1982
- Echinoderes bispinosus Higgins, 1982
- Echinoderes bookhouti Higgins, 1964
- Echinoderes brevicaudatus Higgins, 1977
- Echinoderes canariensis Greeff, 1869
- Echinoderes cantabricus Pardos, Higgins & Benito, 1998
- Echinoderes capitatus (Zelinka, 1928)
- Echinoderes caribiensis Kirsteuer, 1964
- Echinoderes cavernus Sørensen, Jörgensen & Boesgaard, 2000
- Echinoderes cernunnos Sørensen, Rho, Min, Kim & Chang, 2012
- Echinoderes citrinus Zelinka, 1928
- Echinoderes collinae Sørensen, 2006
- Echinoderes coulli Higgins, 1977
- Echinoderes dujardinii Claparède, 1863
- Echinoderes ehlersi Zelinka, 1913
- Echinoderes elongatus (Nyholm, 1947)
- Echinoderes eximus Higgins & Kristensen, 1988
- Echinoderes ferrugineus Zelinka, 1928
- Echinoderes filispinosus Adrianov, 1989
- Echinoderes gerardi Higgins, 1978
- Echinoderes gizoensis Thormar & Sørensen, 2010
- Echinoderes higginsi Huys & Coomans, 1989
- Echinoderes hispanicus Pardos, Higgins & Benito, 1998
- Echinoderes horni Higgins, 1983
- Echinoderes imperforatus Higgins, 1983
- Echinoderes intermedius Sørensen, 2006
- Echinoderes isabelae GaOrdóñez, Pardos & Benito, 2008
- Echinoderes kanni Thormar & Sørensen, 2010
- Echinoderes koreanus Adrianov, 1999 in Adrianov & Malakhov, 1999
- Echinoderes kozloffi Higgins, 1977
- Echinoderes krishnaswamyi Higgins, 1985
- Echinoderes kristenseni Higgins, 1985
- Echinoderes lanceolatus Chang & Song, 2002
- Echinoderes levanderi Karling, 1955
- Echinoderes malakhovi Adrianov, 1999 in Adrianov & Malakhov, 1999
- Echinoderes maxwelli (Omer-Cooper, 1957)
- Echinoderes microaperturus Sørensen, Rho, Min, Kim & Chang, 2012
- Echinoderes multisetosus Adrianov, 1989
- Echinoderes neospinosus GaOrdóñez, Pardos & Benito, 2008
- Echinoderes newcaledoniensis Higgins, 1967
- Echinoderes obtuspinosus Sørensen, Rho, Min, Kim & Chang, 2012
- Echinoderes ohtsukaii Yamasaki & Kajihara, 2012
- Echinoderes pacificus Schmidt, 1974
- Echinoderes parrai GaOrdóñez, Pardos & Benito, 2008
- Echinoderes pennaki Higgins, 1960
- Echinoderes peterseni Higgins & Kristensen, 1988
- Echinoderes pilosus Lang, 1949
- Echinoderes remanei (Blake, 1930)
- Echinoderes rex Lundbye, Rho & Sørensen, 2011
- Echinoderes riedli Higgins, 1966
- Echinoderes sensibilis Adrianov, Murakami & Shirayama, 2002
- Echinoderes setiger (Greeff, 1869)
- Echinoderes skipperae Sørensen & Landers, 2014
- Echinoderes spinifurca Sørensen, Heiner & Ziemer, 2005
- Echinoderes stockmani Adrianov, 1999 in Adrianov & Malakhov, 1999
- Echinoderes subfuscus Zelinka, 1928
- Echinoderes sublicarum Higgins, 1977
- Echinoderes svetlanae Adrianov, 1999 in Adrianov & Malakhov, 1999
- Echinoderes tchefouensis Lou, 1934
- Echinoderes teretis Brown, 1999 in Adrianov & Malakhov, 1999
- Echinoderes truncatus Higgins, 1983
- Echinoderes tubilak Higgins & Kristensen, 1988
- Echinoderes ulsanensis Adrianov, 1999 in Adrianov & Malakhov, 1999
- Echinoderes wallaceae Higgins, 1983
- Echinoderes worthingi Southern, 1914
