= Dracoderidae =

Scientific classification
- Kingdom: Animalia
- Phylum: Kinorhyncha
- Class: Allomalorhagida
- Family: Dracoderidae; Higgins & Shirayama, 1990

Family of small marine invertebrates

Dracoderidae is a family of worms belonging to the class Cyclorhagida.

Genera:

- Dracoderes Higgins & Shirayama, 1990
