= Semnoderidae =

Scientific classification
- Domain: Eukaryota
- Kingdom: Animalia
- Phylum: Kinorhyncha
- Class: Cyclorhagida
- Order: Kentrorhagata
- Family: Semnoderidae; Remane, 1929

Family of small marine invertebrates

Semnoderidae is a family of worms belonging to the class Cyclorhagida.

Genera:

- Antygomonas? Nebelsick, 1990
- Parasemnoderes Adrianov & Maiorova, 2018
- Semnoderes Zelinka, 1907
- Sphenoderes Higgins, 1969
