= Sternum (arthropod anatomy) =

Body part in invertebrates

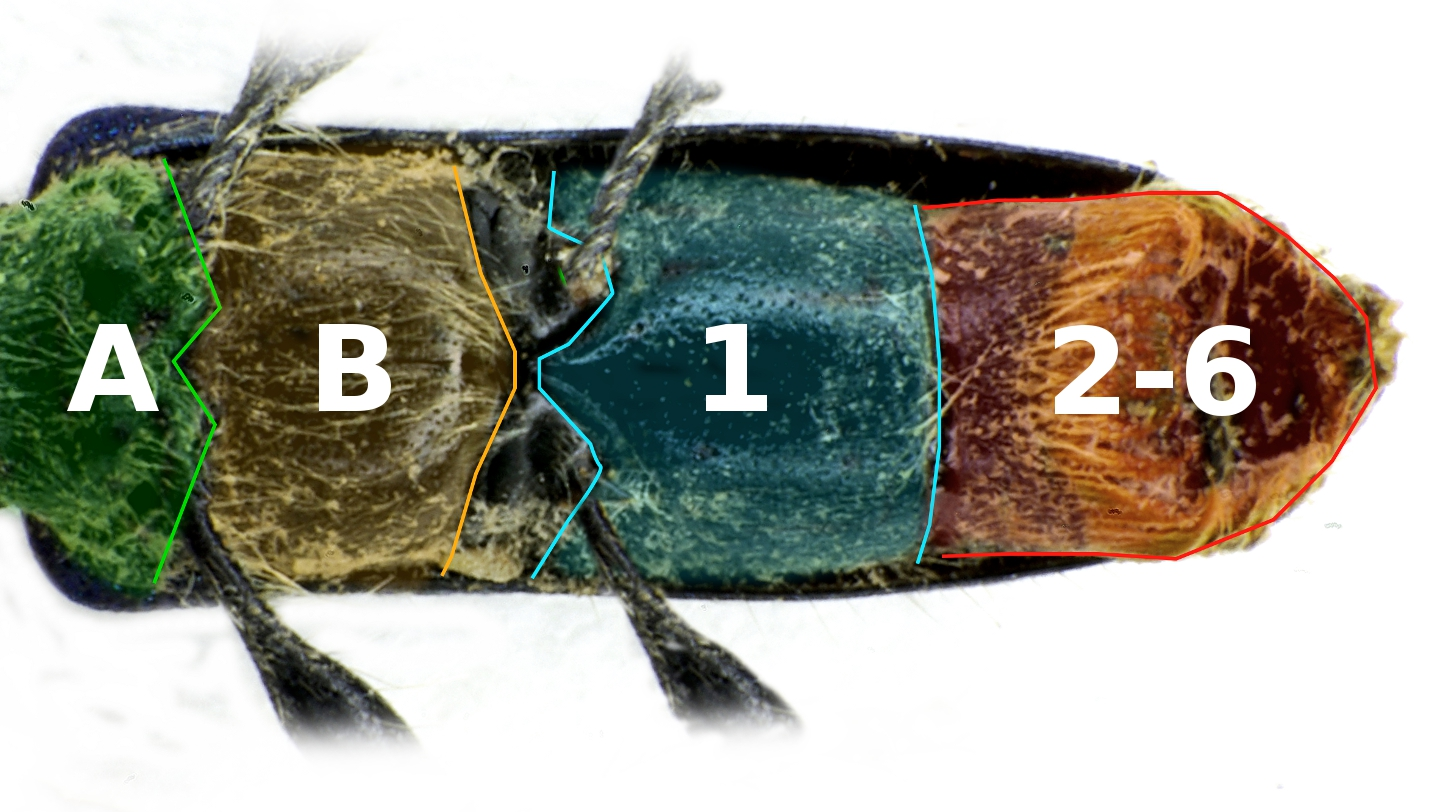
Thoracic and abdominal sterna of a beetle. A Mesosternum, B Metasternum, 1 first abdominal sternite, 2-6 rest of sternites

The sternum (pl.: sterna) is the ventral portion of a segment of an arthropod thorax or abdomen.

In insects, the sterna are usually single, large sclerites, and external. However, they can sometimes be divided in two or more, in which case the subunits are called sternites, and may also be modified on the terminal abdominal segments so as to form part of the functional genitalia, in which case they are frequently reduced in size and development, and may become internalized and/or membranous. For a detailed explanation of the terminology, see

Kinorhynchs have tergal and sternal plates too, though seemingly not homologous with those of arthropods.

Ventrites are externally visible sternites. Usually the first sternite is covered up, so that ventrite numbers do not correspond to sternite numbers.

The term is also used in other arthropod groups such as crustaceans, arachnids and myriapods. Sternites on the pleon (abdomen) of a crustacean may be referred to as pleonsternites. These are the sites of attachment of the pleopods (swimming legs). In spiders, the sternum is the ventral part of the cephalothorax.

== See also ==
- Tergite – Dorsal (upper) portion sclerite (hardened body part) of an arthropod
