= Cateria =

Scientific classification
- Kingdom: Animalia
- Phylum: Kinorhyncha
- Class: Cyclorhagida
- Order: Kentrorhagata
- Family: Cateriidae; Gerlach, 1956
- Genus: Cateria; Gerlach, 1956

Family of small marine invertebrates

Cateriidae is a family of kinorhynchs placed either in the class Cyclorhagida (according to Sørensen et al.) or Allomalorhagida (according to Herranz et al.). It consists of a single genus, Cateria Gerlach, 1956.

== Species ==
- Cateria gerlachi Higgins, 1968
- Cateria styx Gerlach, 1956
