= Neocentrophyidae =

Scientific classification
- Kingdom: Animalia
- Phylum: Kinorhyncha
- Class: Allomalorhagida
- Family: Neocentrophyidae; Higgins, 1969

Family of small marine invertebrates

Neocentrophyidae is a family of kinorhynchs in the class Allomalorhagida.

== Genera ==
- Neocentrophyes Higgins, 1969
- Paracentrophyes Higgins, 1983
