= Centroderidae =

Scientific classification
- Domain: Eukaryota
- Kingdom: Animalia
- Phylum: Kinorhyncha
- Class: Cyclorhagida
- Order: Kentrorhagata
- Family: Centroderidae; Zelinka, 1896

Family of small marine invertebrates

Centroderidae is a family of kinorhynchs belonging to the class Cyclorhagida.

Genera:

- Campyloderes Zelinka, 1907
- Centroderes Zelinka, 1907
- Condyloderes Higgins, 1969
