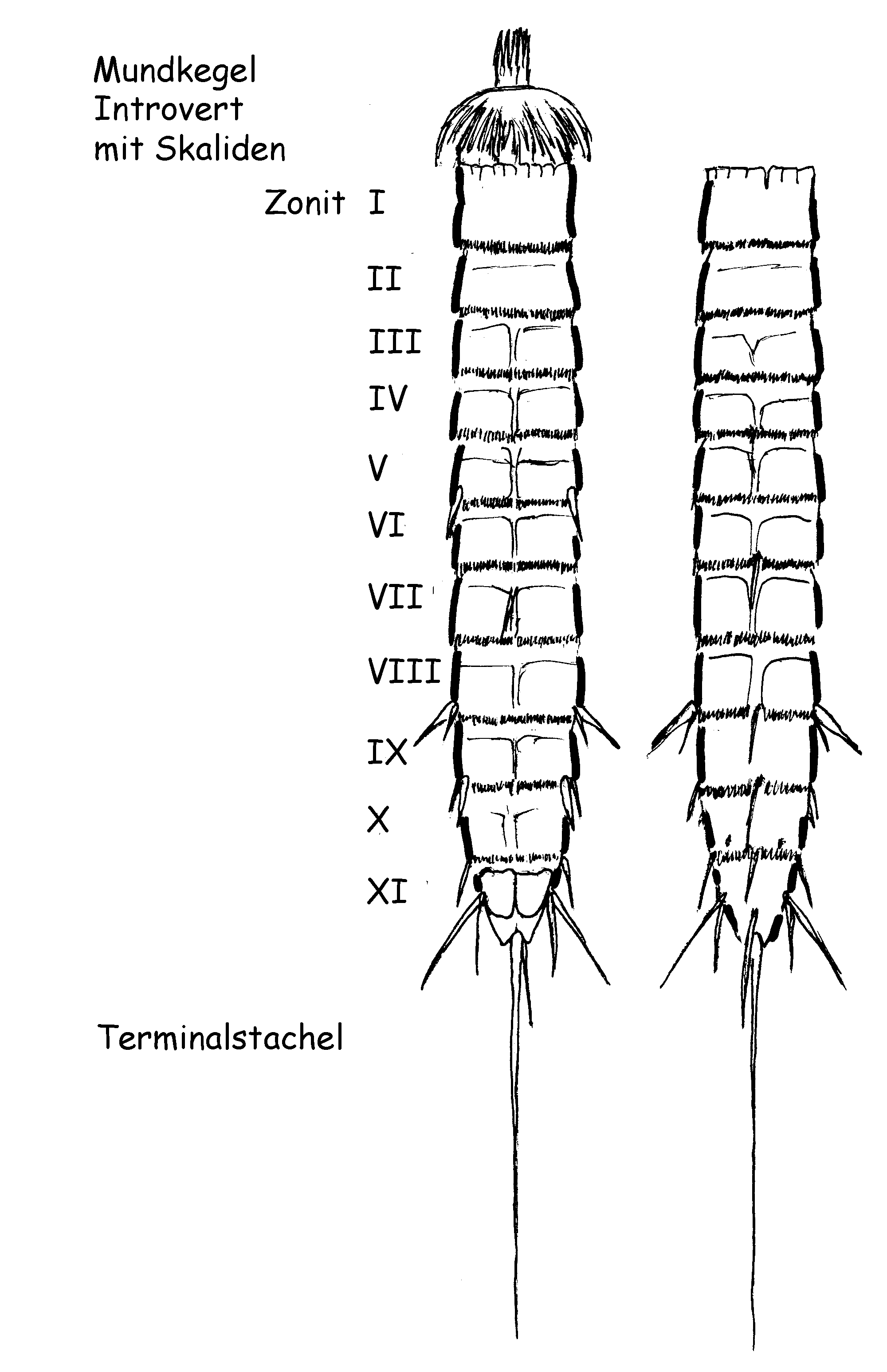
- Zelinkaderidae

Scientific classification
- Domain: Eukaryota
- Kingdom: Animalia
- Phylum: Kinorhyncha
- Class: Cyclorhagida
- Order: Kentrorhagata
- Family: Zelinkaderidae; Higgins, 1990

= Zelinkaderidae =

Family of small marine invertebrates

Zelinkaderidae is a family of worms belonging to the class Cyclorhagida.

Genera:

- Triodontoderes Sørensen & Rho, 2009
- Zelinkaderes Higgins, 1990
