= Antygomonas =

Scientific classification
- Domain: Eukaryota
- Kingdom: Animalia
- Phylum: Kinorhyncha
- Class: Cyclorhagida
- Order: Kentrorhagata
- Family: Antygomonidae; Adrianov & Malakhov, 1994
- Genus: Antygomonas; Nebelsick, 1990

Genus of small marine invertebrates

Antygomonas is a genus of cyclorhagids. It is the only genus in the family Antygomonidae Adrianov & Malakhov, 1994. Species of Antygomonas are commonly referred to as "mud dragons."

== Species ==
- Antygomonas incomitata Nebelsick, 1990
- Antygomonas oreas Bauer-Nebelsick, 1996
- Antygomonas paulae Sørensen, 2007
