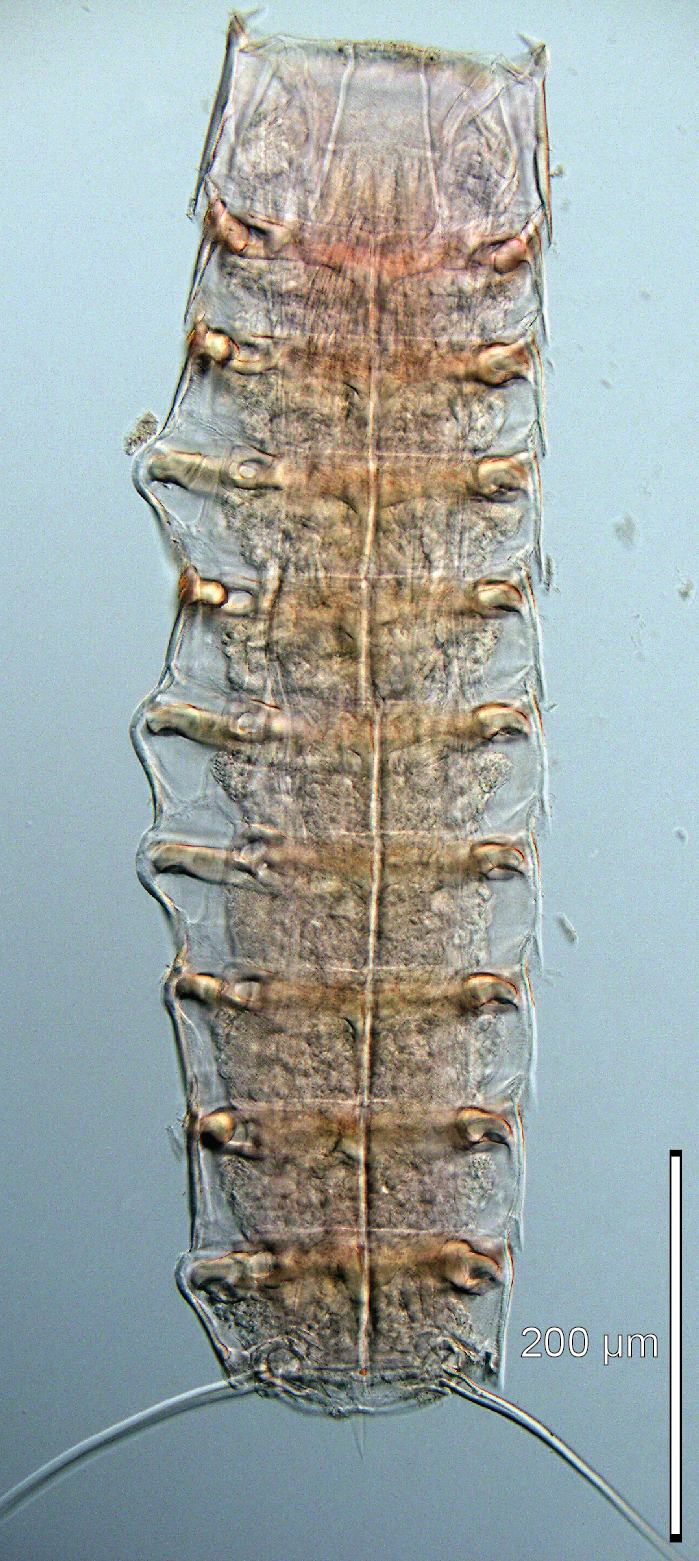
- Cristaphyes glaurung

Scientific classification
- Kingdom: Animalia
- Phylum: Kinorhyncha
- Class: Allomalorhagida
- Family: Pycnophyidae; Zelnka, 1896

Type genus
- Pycnophyes Zelinka, 1907

Genera
- See text.

Synonyms
- Trachydemidae Zelinka, 1896

= Pycnophyidae =

Family of small marine invertebrates

Pycnophyidae is a family of kinorhynchs in the class Allomalorhagida.

== Genera ==
The following genera are recognised:

- Cristaphyes Sánchez, Yamasaki, Pardos, Sørensen & Martínez, 2016
- Fujuriphyes Sánchez, Yamasaki, Pardos, Sørensen & Martínez, 2016
- Higginsium Sánchez, Yamasaki, Pardos, Sørensen & Martínez, 2016
- Kinorhynchus Sheremetevskij, 1974
- Krakenella Sánchez, Yamasaki, Pardos, Sørensen & Martínez, 2016
- Leiocanthus Sánchez, Yamasaki, Pardos, Sørensen & Martínez, 2016
- Pycnophyes Zelinka, 1907
- Setaphyes Sánchez, Yamasaki, Pardos, Sørensen & Martínez, 2016
