= Pockmark (geology) =

Craters in the seabed

A pockmark is a concave, crater-like depression on a seabed that is caused by fluids (liquids and gases) escaping and erupting through the seafloor. They can vary in size and have been found worldwide.

Pockmarks were discovered off the coasts of Nova Scotia, Canada in the late 1960s by Lew King and Brian McLean of the Bedford Institute of Oceanography, using a new side scan sonar developed in the late 1960s by Kelvin Hughes. Before the two researchers King and McLean used the side scan sonar, they had noticed 'notches' on echo sounder and shallow seismic records in the seafloor off Nova Scotia. They believed these notches to represent gullies and curvilinear troughs in the muddy seafloor. However, they could never work out how to join these notches from one survey line to the next. It was, therefore, not before they surveyed with the area-coverage system, Side scan sonar, that they realized the notches were in fact closed depressions (craters) and not curvilinear features. This was a great surprise, because there are very few craters on the Earth's surface.

Although pockmarks were first documented and published 50 years ago, they are currently still being discovered on the ocean floor and in many lakes, the world over. Spatial delineation and morphometric characterisation of pockmarks in the central North Sea seabed have been achieved by semi-automatic methods.

The craters off Nova Scotia are up to 150 m (490 ft) in diameter and 10 m (33 ft) deep. Pockmarks have been found worldwide. Discovery was aided by the use of high-resolution multibeam acoustic systems for bathymetric mapping. In these cases, pockmarks have been interpreted as the morphological expression of gas or oil leakage from an active hydrocarbon system or a deep overpressured petroleum reservoir. Specifically, long-term deep fluid flow resulting in pockmarks is linked to undersea methane gas escape under pressure.

== See also ==
- Cold seeps
- Limnic eruption
- Demersal fish

== Bibliography ==
- Kelley, Joseph T.; Dickson, Stephen M.; Belknap, Daniel F.; Barnhardt, Walter A.; Henderson, Mark (1994). "Giant sea-bed pockmarks: Evidence for gas escape from Belfast Bay, Maine". Geology. 22 (1): 59–62. doi:10.1130/0091-7613(1994)022<0059:GSBPEF>2.3.CO;2.
- Paull, C. K.; Ussler, Bill (2008). "Re-evaluating the significance of sea- floor accumulations of methanederived carbonates: seepage or erosion indicators?". doi:10.14288/1.0041014. OSTI 21104924.
- Petersen, Carl Jörg; Bünz, Stefan; Hustoft, Steinar; Mienert, Jürgen; Klaeschen, Dirk (2010). "High-resolution P-Cable 3D seismic imaging of gas chimney structures in gas hydrated sediments of an Arctic sediment drift". Marine and Petroleum Geology. 27 (9): 1981–1994. doi:10.1016/j.marpetgeo.2010.06.006.
