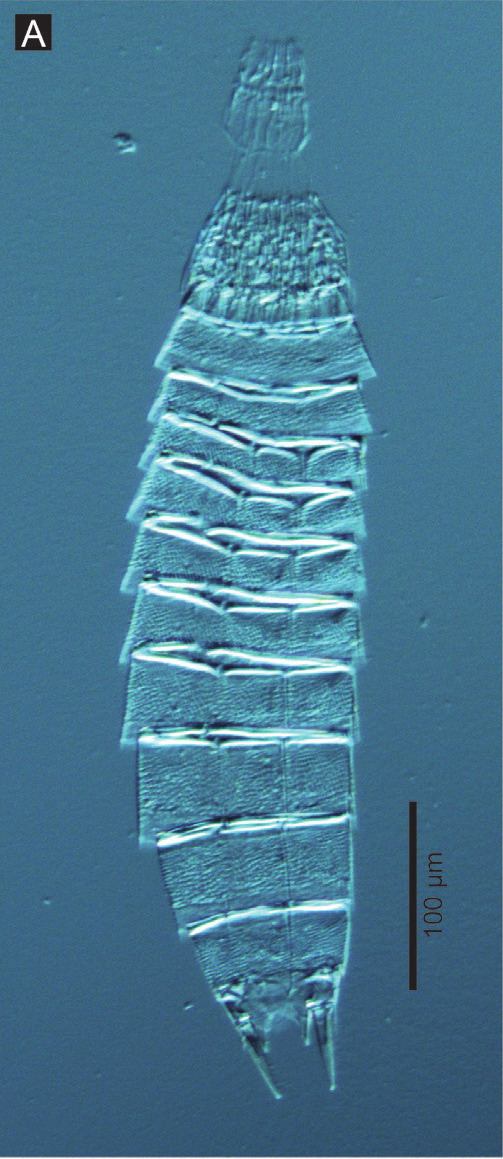
- Echinoderes hwiizaa

Scientific classification
- Kingdom: Animalia
- Phylum: Kinorhyncha
- Class: Cyclorhagida
- Order: Echinorhagata
- Family: Echinoderidae; Carus, 1885

= Echinoderidae =

Family of small marine invertebrates

Echinoderidae is a family of kinorhynchs (also known as mud dragons) in the class Cyclorhagida.

Kinorhyncha currently includes around 300 valid species, distributed on eleven families. However, nearly half of the species are accommodated in a single family, Echinoderidae.

The family is characterized by species with trunk segment 1 always forming a closed ring, segment 2 showing variation in its plate composition, and segments 3 to 10 consisting of a tergal and two sternal plates. Middorsal spines are, if present at all, restricted to appear on segments 4 to 8, and a midterminal spine is never present in adults.

Five genera, Echinoderes, Cephalorhyncha, Fissuroderes, Meristoderes, and Polacanthoderes, are currently recognized within the family. The latter four genera are rather small and accommodate one to nine species only, whereas a vast majority of the diversity is contained in the Echinoderes, that holds more than 100 species.

Globally Echinoderes are the most diverse, abundant and commonly encountered of all kinorhynch genera. The number of described Echinoderes species has more than doubled since 2002 and it is still increasing in recent years.

== Genera ==
- Cephalorhyncha Adrianov & Malakhov, 1999
- Echinoderes Clarapède, 1863
- Fissuroderes Neuhaus & Blasche, 2006
- Meristoderes Herranz, Thormar, Benito, Sánchez & Pardos, 2012
- Polacanthoderes Sørensen, 2008
