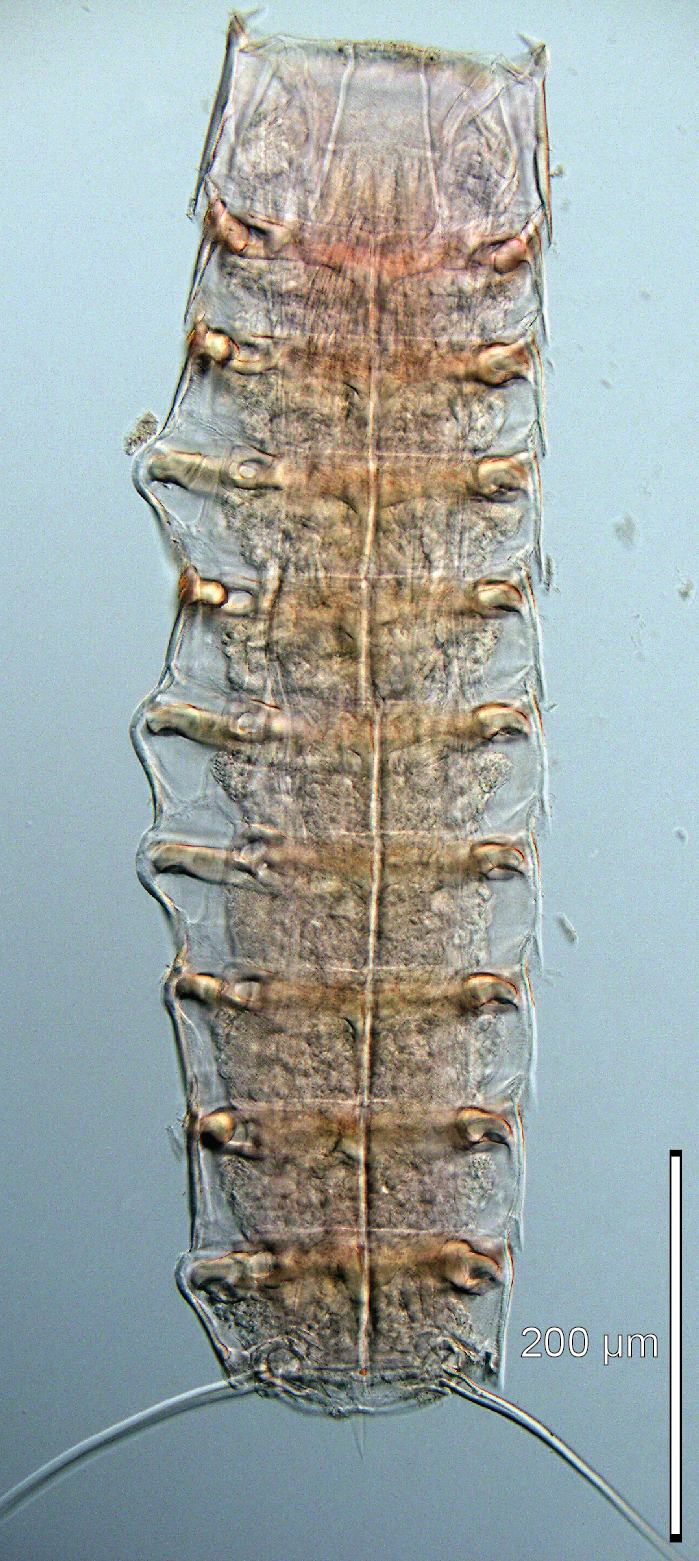
- Cristaphyes glaurung

Scientific classification
- Domain: Eukaryota
- Kingdom: Animalia
- Phylum: Kinorhyncha
- Class: Allomalorhagida

Families
- See text

Synonyms
- Homalorhagae; Homalorhagida

= Allomalorhagida =

Class of marine invertebrates

Allomalorhagida is a class of worms belonging to the phylum Kinorhyncha. The class historically had no orders, and was only divided into families. Recently, Pycnophidae has been found to be sister to the order Anomoirhaga, comprising the other four families.

== Families ==
Allomalorhagida consists of the following families:

- Pycnophyidae
- Order Anomoirhaga
  - Cateriidae
  - Dracoderidae
  - Franciscideridae
  - Neocentrophyidae
