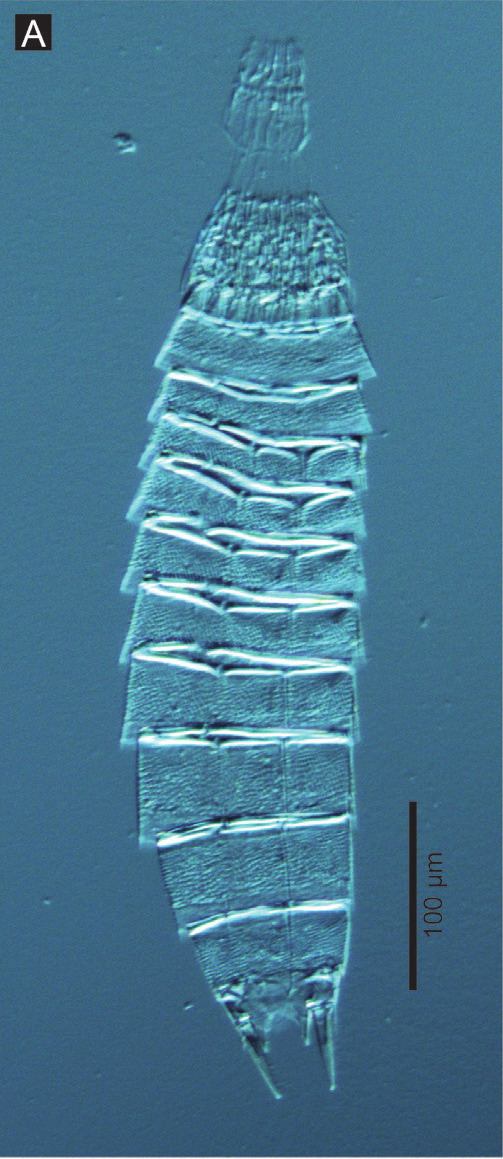
- Echinoderes hwiizaa

Scientific classification
- Domain: Eukaryota
- Kingdom: Animalia
- Phylum: Kinorhyncha
- Class: Cyclorhagida; Zelinka, 1896

Orders and families
- See text

= Cyclorhagida =

Order of small marine invertebrates

Cyclorhagida is a class of kinorhynchs, small marine invertebrates that are widespread in mud or sand at all depths as part of the meiobenthos, commonly known as mud dragons.

== Orders and families ==
- Order Echinorhagata Sørensen et al., 2015
  - Echinoderidae Zelinka, 1894
- Order Kentrorhagata Sørensen et al., 2015
  - Antygomonidae Adrianov & Malakhov, 1994
  - Cateriidae Gerlach, 1956
  - Centroderidae Zelinka, 1896
  - Semnoderidae Remane, 1929
  - Zelinkaderidae Higgins, 1990
- Order Xenosomata Zelinka, 1907
    - Campyloderidae Remane, 1929
- Family incertae sedis
  - Tubulideres Sørensen, Heiner, Ziemer & Neuhaus, 2007
  - Wollunquaderes Sørensen & Thormar, 2010
