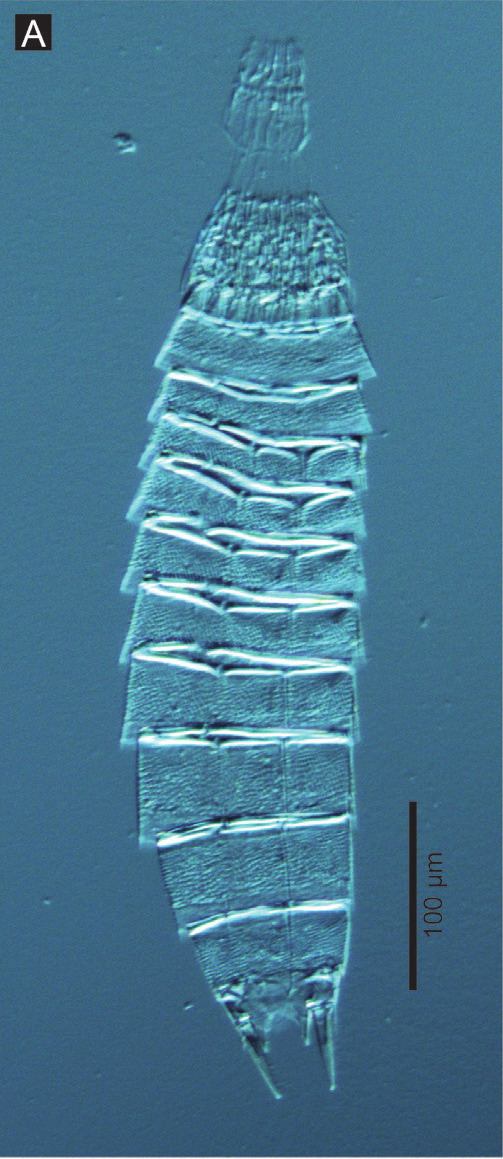
- Echinoderes hwiiza

Scientific classification
- Kingdom: Animalia
- Subkingdom: Eumetazoa
- Clade: ParaHoxozoa
- Clade: Bilateria
- Clade: Nephrozoa
- Clade: Protostomia
- Superphylum: Ecdysozoa
- Clade: Scalidophora
- Phylum: Kinorhyncha; Reinhard, 1881

Orders
- See text

= Kinorhyncha =

Kinorhyncha Temporal range: Early Cambrian–Recent

Phylum of small marine pseudocoelomate invertebrates

Kinorhyncha /kaɪnoʊˈrɪŋkə, kɪnə-/ (Ancient Greek: κινέω, romanized: kīnéō, lit. 'I move', ῥύγχος rhúnkhos "snout") is a phylum of small marine invertebrates that are widespread in mud or sand at all depths as part of the meiobenthos. They are commonly called mud dragons. Modern species are 1 mm (0.039 in) or less, but Cambrian forms could reach 4 cm (1.6 in).

== Anatomy ==
Living Echinoderes specimen, showing movement and head retraction

Kinorhynchs are limbless animals, with a body consisting of a head, neck, and a trunk of eleven segments. They are the only members of Ecdysozoa, except from the panarthropoda, with a segmented body; a feature that probably evolved independently from them. Juveniles have eight or nine segments, depending on genus, with the last two or three being added later during growth. A Cambrian species, Eokinorhynchus rarus, had about twice as many segments as present forms. Like other ecdysozoans they do not have external cilia, but instead have a number of spines along the body, plus up to seven circles of spines around the head. These spines are used for locomotion, withdrawing the head and pushing forward, then gripping the substrate with the spines while drawing up the body.

The body wall consists of a thin syncitial layer, which secretes a tough cuticle; this is molted several times while growing to adulthood. The spines are essentially moveable extensions of the body wall, and are hollow and covered by cuticle. The head is completely retractable, and is covered by a set of neck plates called placids when retracted.

Myoanatomy of the body of Echinoderes spinifurca

Kinorhynchs eat either diatoms or organic material found in the mud, depending on species. The mouth is located in a conical structure at the apex of the head, and opens into a pharynx and then an oesophagus, both of which are lined by cuticle. Two pairs of salivary glands and one or more pairs of "pancreatic glands" connect to the oesophagus and presumably secrete digestive enzymes. Beyond the oesophagus lies a midgut that combines the functions of a stomach and intestine, and lacks a cuticle, enabling it to absorb nutrients. The short hind-gut is lined by cuticle, and empties into an anus at the posterior end of the trunk.

There is no circulatory system, although the body cavity (pseudocoelom) is well developed, and includes amoebocytes. The excretory system consists of two protonephridia emptying through pores in the final segment.

Echinoderes close up head anatomy

The nervous system consists of a ventral nerve cord, with one ganglion in each segment, and an anterior nerve ring surrounding the pharynx. Smaller ganglia are also located in the lateral and dorsal portions of each segment, but do not form distinct cords. Some species have simple ocelli on the head, and all species have tiny bristles on the body to provide a sense of touch.

=== Reproduction ===
There are two sexes that look alike, although some sexual dimorphism in allometry has been reported. A pair of gonads are located in the mid-region of the trunk, and open to pores in the final segment. In most species, the sperm duct includes two or three spiny structures that presumably aid in copulation, although the details are unknown. Individual spermatozoa can reach a quarter of the total body length. The larvae are free-living, but little else is known of their reproductive process. After having laid an egg, the female packs it into a protective envelope of mud and organic material. There are six juvenile stages, during which segments are added and morphology is slightly modified.

== Classification ==
Their closest relatives are thought to be the phyla Loricifera and Priapulida. Together they constitute the Scalidophora.

=== Taxonomy ===
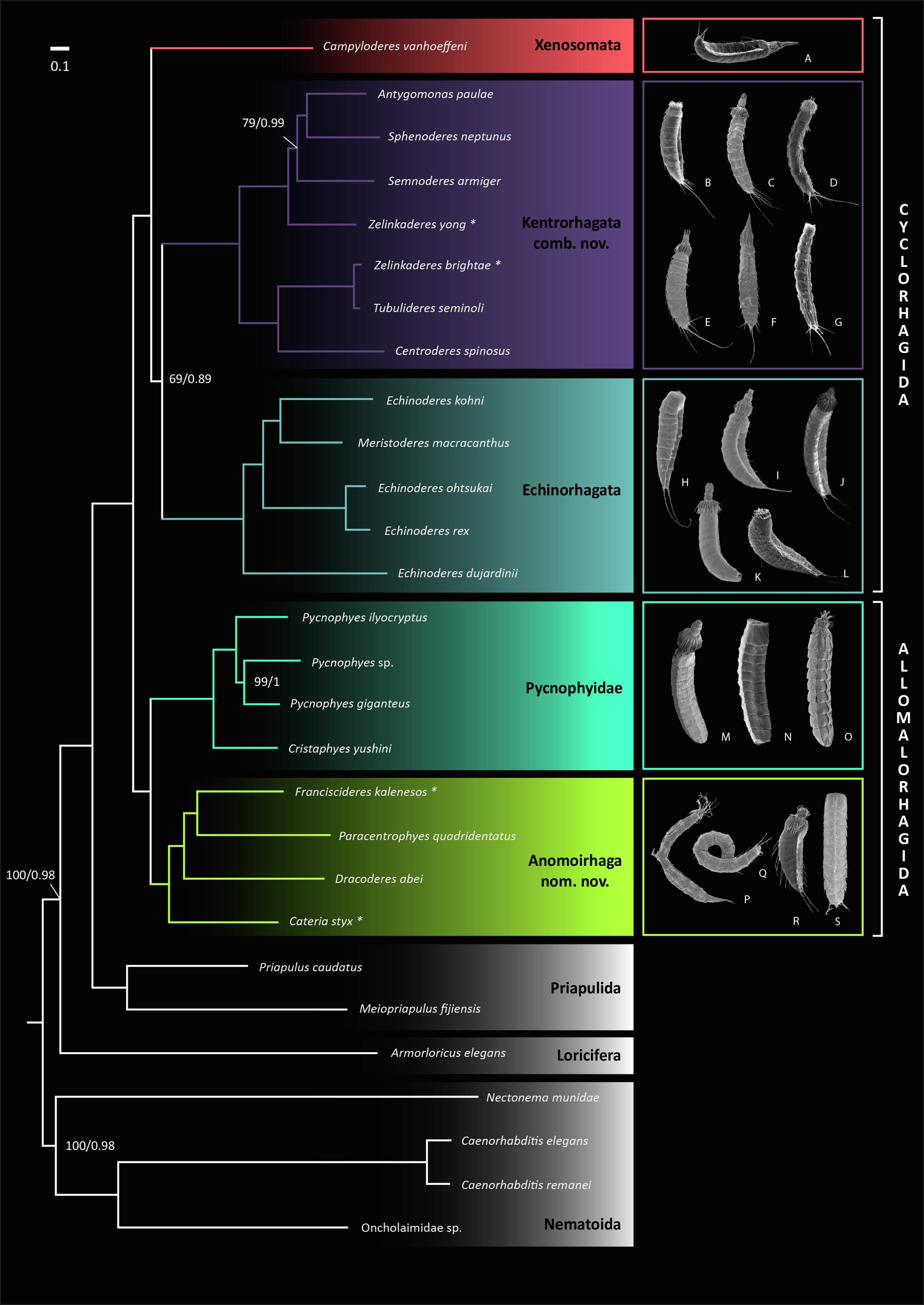
Phylogenetic tree of Kinorhyncha, from Herranz et al. 2022

The two groups of Kinorhynchs are generally characterized as classes in Sørensen et al. (2015). As of 2022, more than 300 species have been described, distributed across 31 genera and 11 families. Morphological data has been collected for systematic phylogeny from dozens, and the integration of this with molecular data has led to a new systematic paradigm featuring the order Allomalorhagida (with Homalorhagida being retired). Phylogenomic data has shown Allomalorhagida and Cyclorhagida to be divided in three and two major clades respectively.

The oldest known species is Eokinorhynchus from the Fortunian of China.

Five genera, Echinoderes, Cephalorhyncha, Fissuroderes, Meristoderes, and Polacanthoderes, are currently recognized within the family. The latter four genera are rather small and accommodate one to nine species only, whereas a vast majority of the diversity is contained in the Echinoderes, that holds more than 100 species.

Globally Echinoderes are the most diverse, abundant and commonly encountered of all kinorhynch genera.

Phylum Kinorhyncha

- †Eokinorhynchus Zhang et al., 2015
- Class Cyclorhagida (Zelinka, 1896) Chitwood, 1951
  - Order Echinorhagata Sørensen et al., 2015
    - Echinoderidae Zelinka, 1894
  - Order Kentrorhagata Sørensen et al., 2015
    - Antygomonidae Adrianov & Malakhov, 1994
    - Cateriidae? Gerlach, 1956 (following Sørensen et al.)
    - Centroderidae Zelinka, 1896
    - Semnoderidae Remane, 1929
    - Zelinkaderidae Higgins, 1990
  - Order Xenosomata Zelinka, 1907
    - Campyloderidae Remane, 1929
- Class Allomalorhagida Sørensen et al., 2015
  - Pycnophyidae Zelinka, 1986
  - Order Anomoirhaga Herranz et al., 2022
    - Cateriidae? Gerlach, 1956 (following Herranz et al.)
    - Dracoderidae Higgins & Shirayama, 1990
    - Franciscideridae Sørensen et al., 2015
    - Neocentrophyidae Higgins, 1969
