= Burgess Shale-type fauna =

Fossilized fauna of Burgess shale

A number of assemblages bear fossil assemblages similar in character to that of the Burgess Shale. While many are also preserved in a similar fashion to the Burgess Shale, the term "Burgess Shale-type fauna" covers assemblages based on taxonomic criteria only.

== Extent ==
The fauna of the middle Cambrian has a cosmopolitan range. All assemblages preserving soft-part anatomy have a very similar fauna, even though they span almost every continent. The wide distribution has been attributed to the advent of pelagic larvae.

== Composition ==
The fauna is composed of a range of soft-bodied organisms; creatures with hard, mineralised skeletons are rare, although trilobites are quite commonly found. The major soft-bodied groups are sponges, palaeoscolecid worms, lobopods, arthropods and anomalocaridids. Assemblages are typically diverse, with the most famous localities each containing in the region of 150 described species. The fauna of the Burgess Shale lived in the photic zone, as bottom-dwelling photosynthesisers are present in the assemblage.

== Example faunas ==
=== Sirius Passet fauna ===
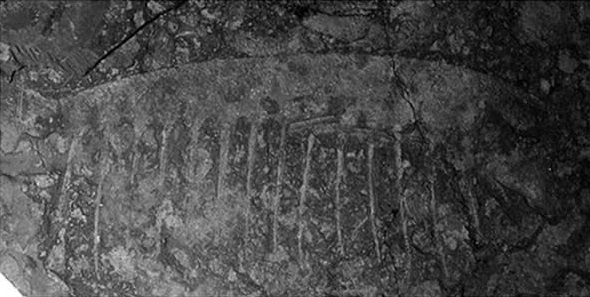
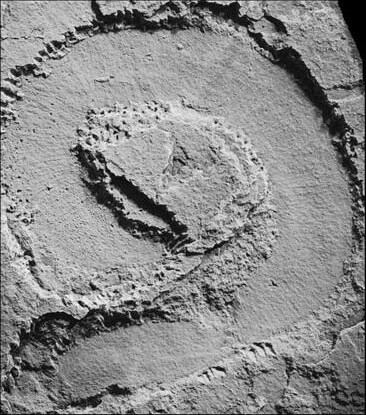
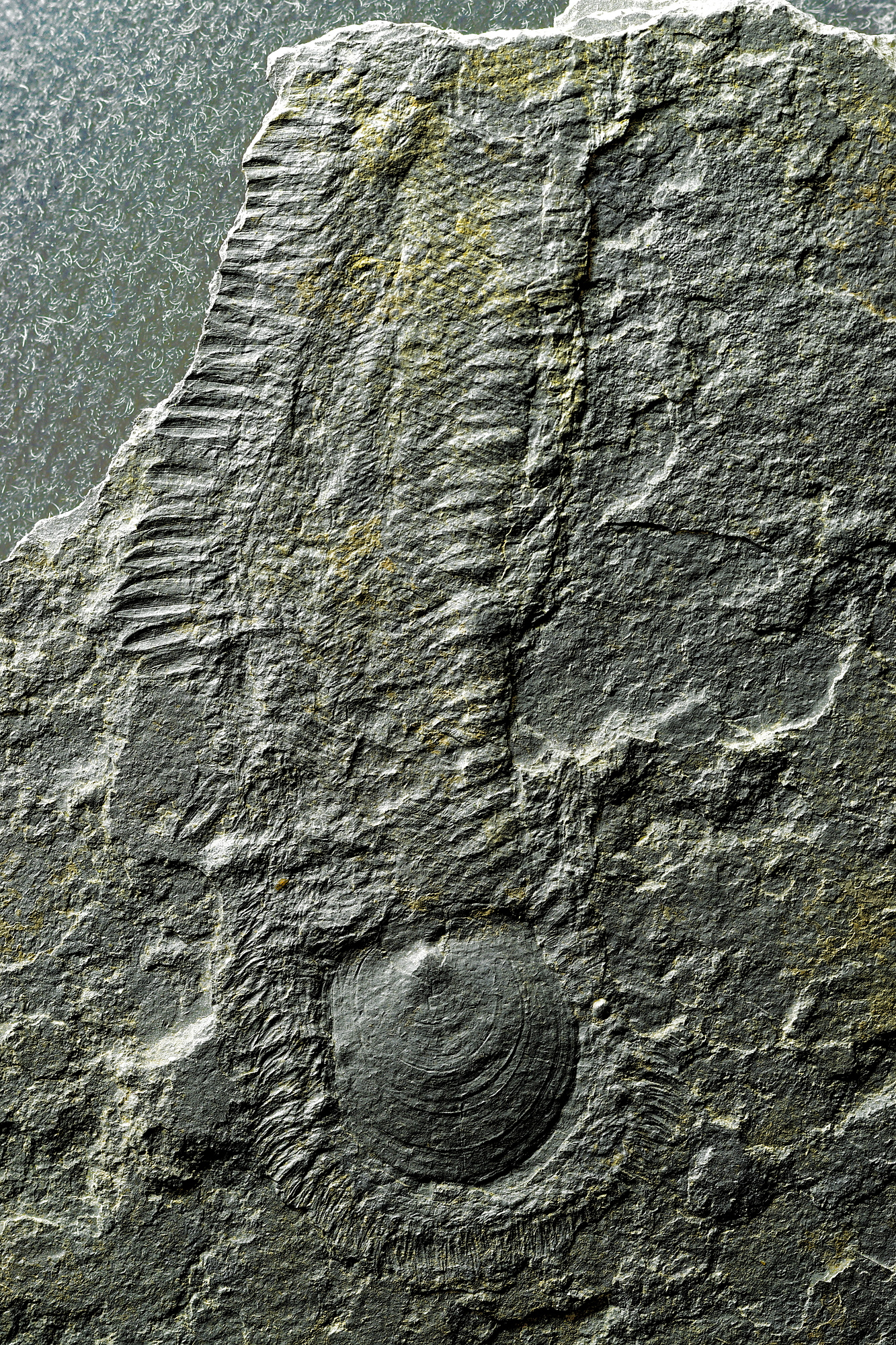
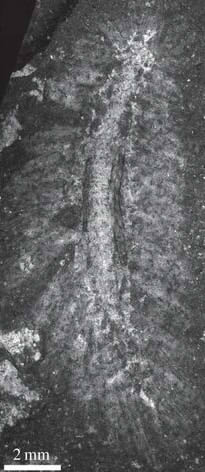
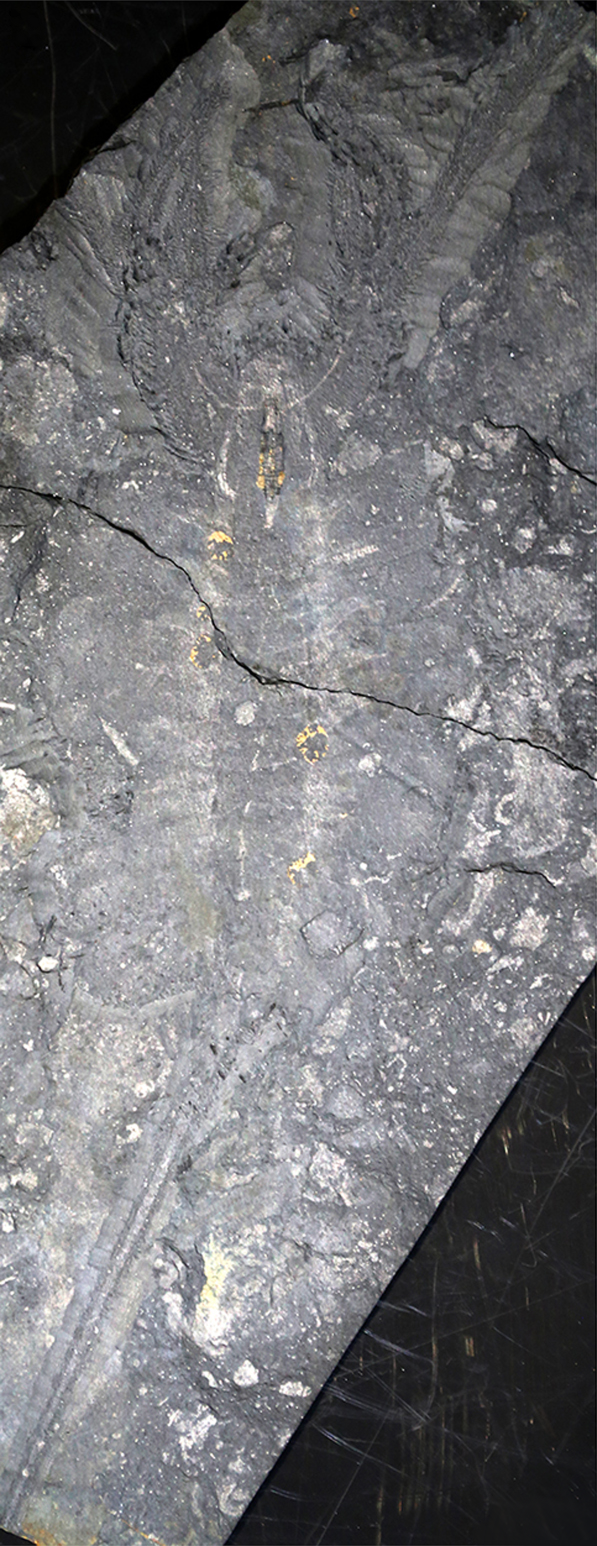
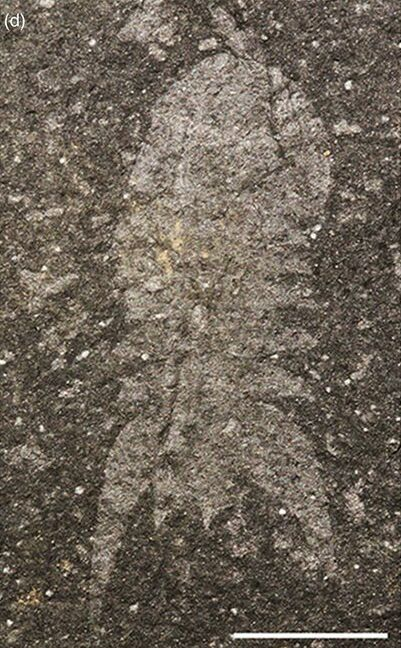
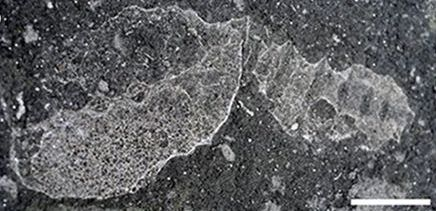
Clockwise from top left: Tamisiocaris, Xystoscolex, Kerygmachela, Ooedigera, Aaveqaspis, Halkieria, Phragmochaeta

Sirius Passet is a lagerstätte in Greenland which was formed about 527 million years ago. Its most common fossils are arthropods, but there is only a handful of trilobite species. There are also very few species with hard parts: trilobites, hyoliths, sponges, brachiopods, and no echinoderms or molluscs.

Halkieria has features associated with more than one living phylum, and is discussed below.

The strangest-looking animals from Sirius Passet are Pambdelurion and Kerygmachela. They are generally regarded as anomalocarids because they have long, soft, segmented bodies with a pair of broad fin-like flaps on most segments and a pair of segmented appendages at the rear. The outer parts of the top surfaces of the flaps have grooved areas which are thought to have acted as gills. Under each flap there is a short, fleshy leg. This arrangement suggests the animals are related to biramous arthropods.

=== Chengjiang fauna ===
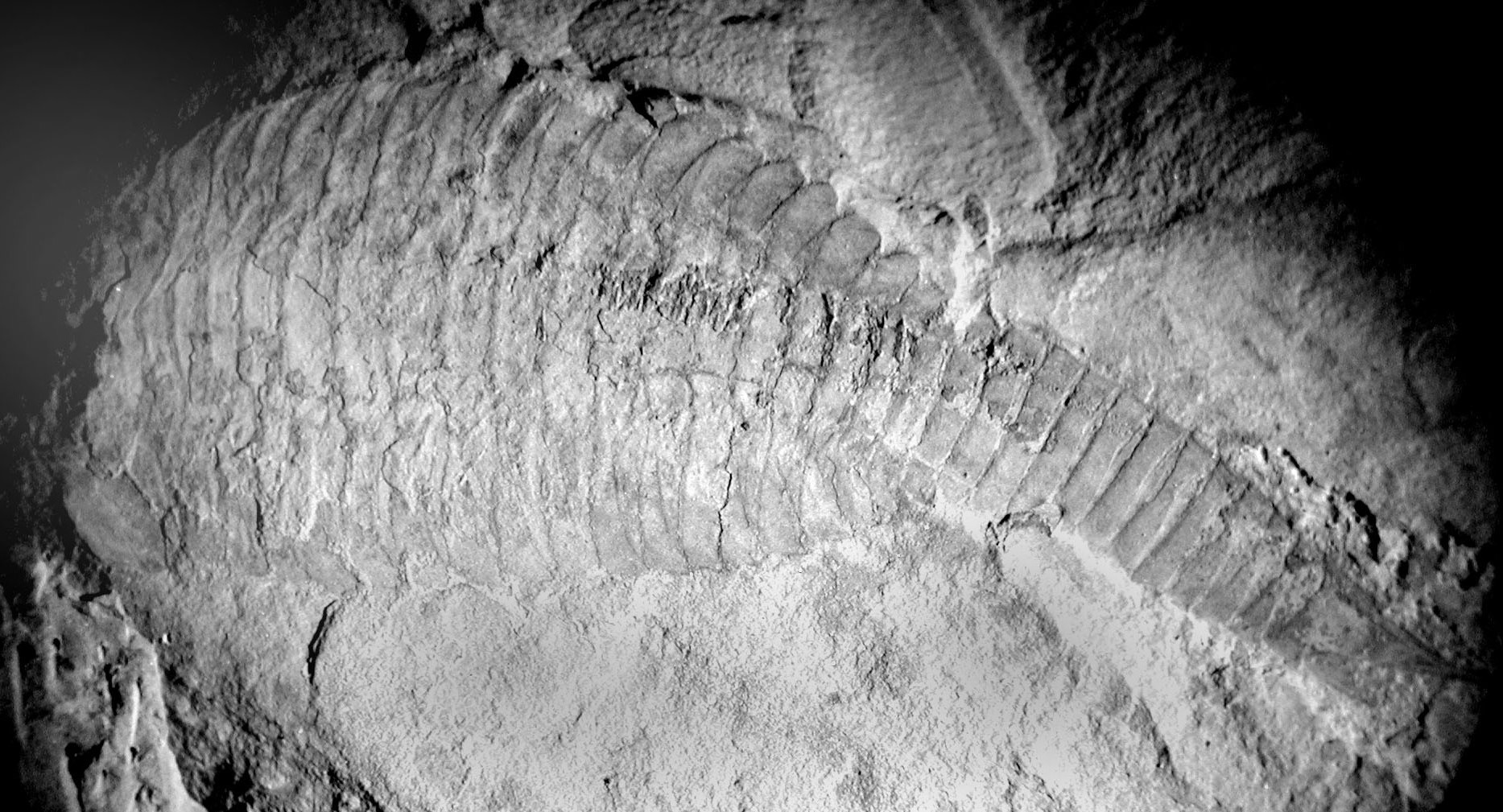
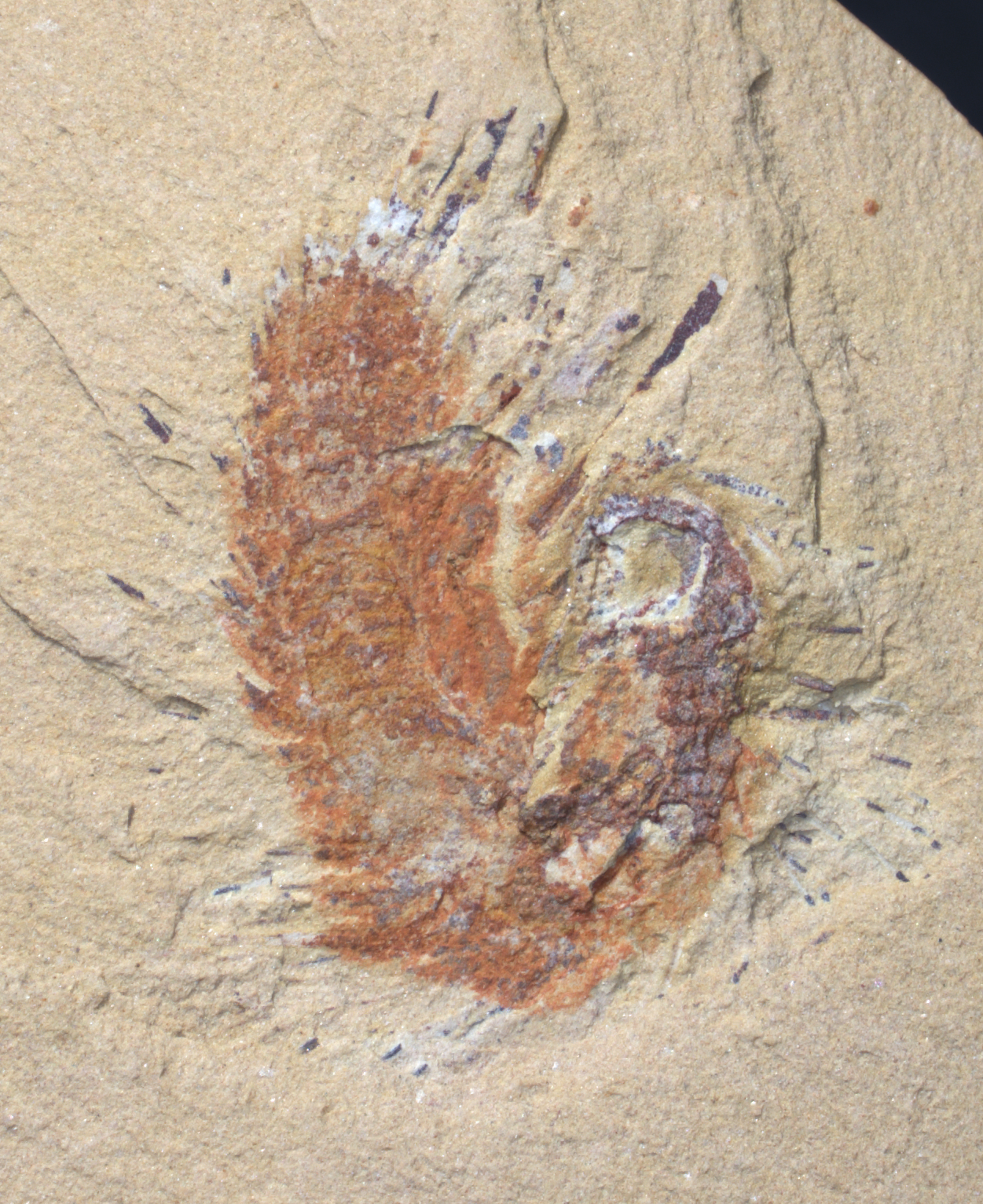
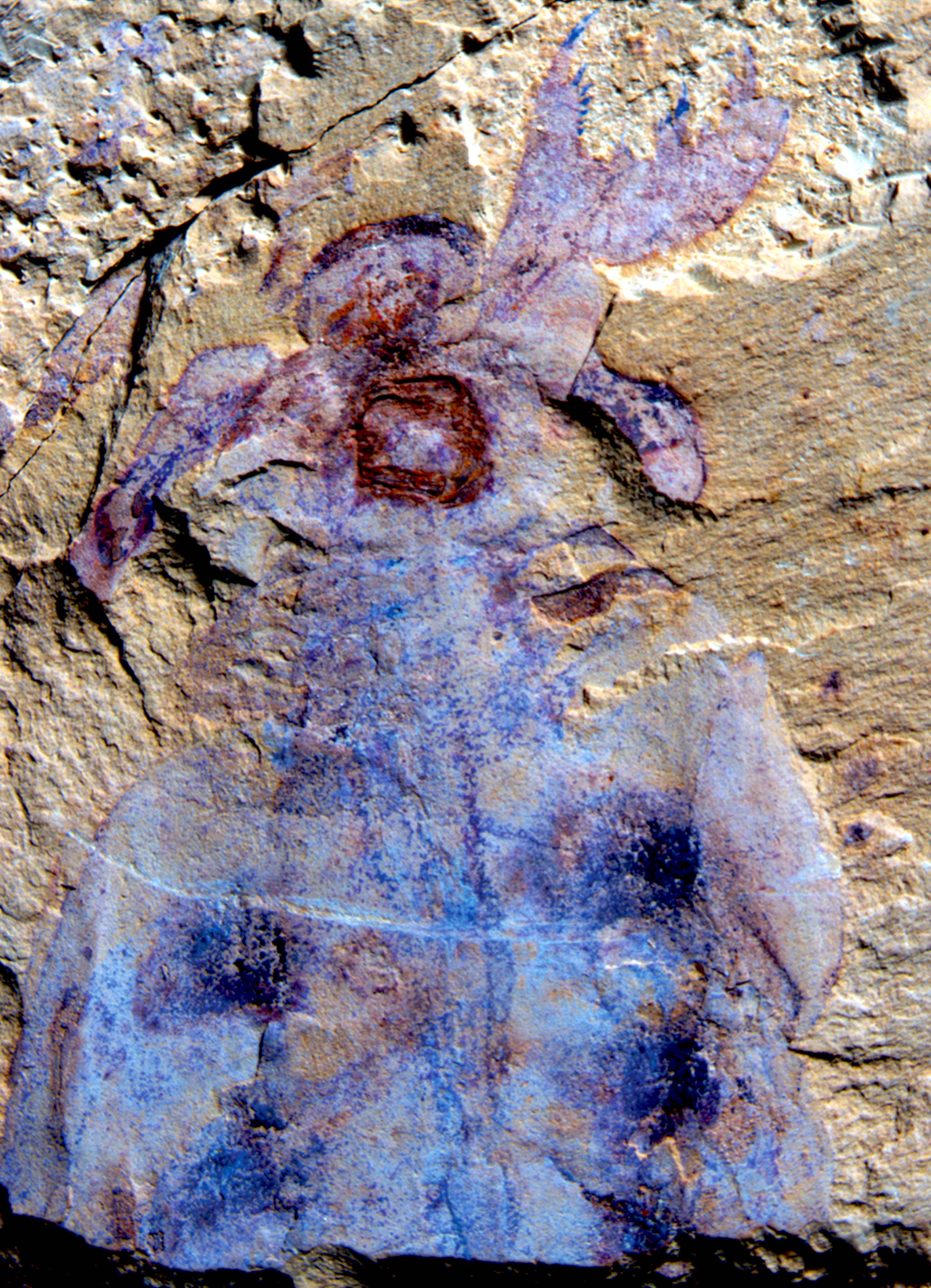
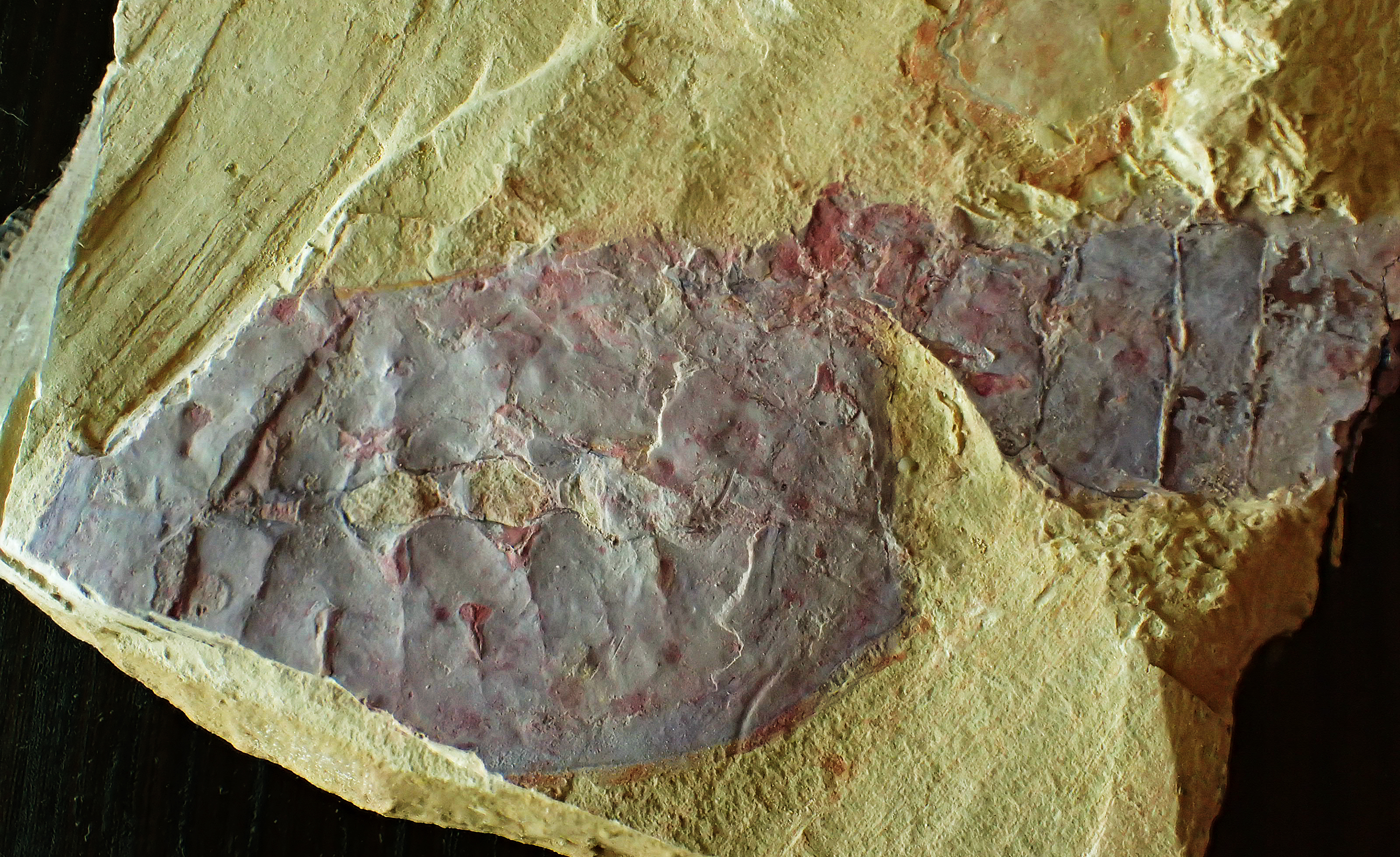
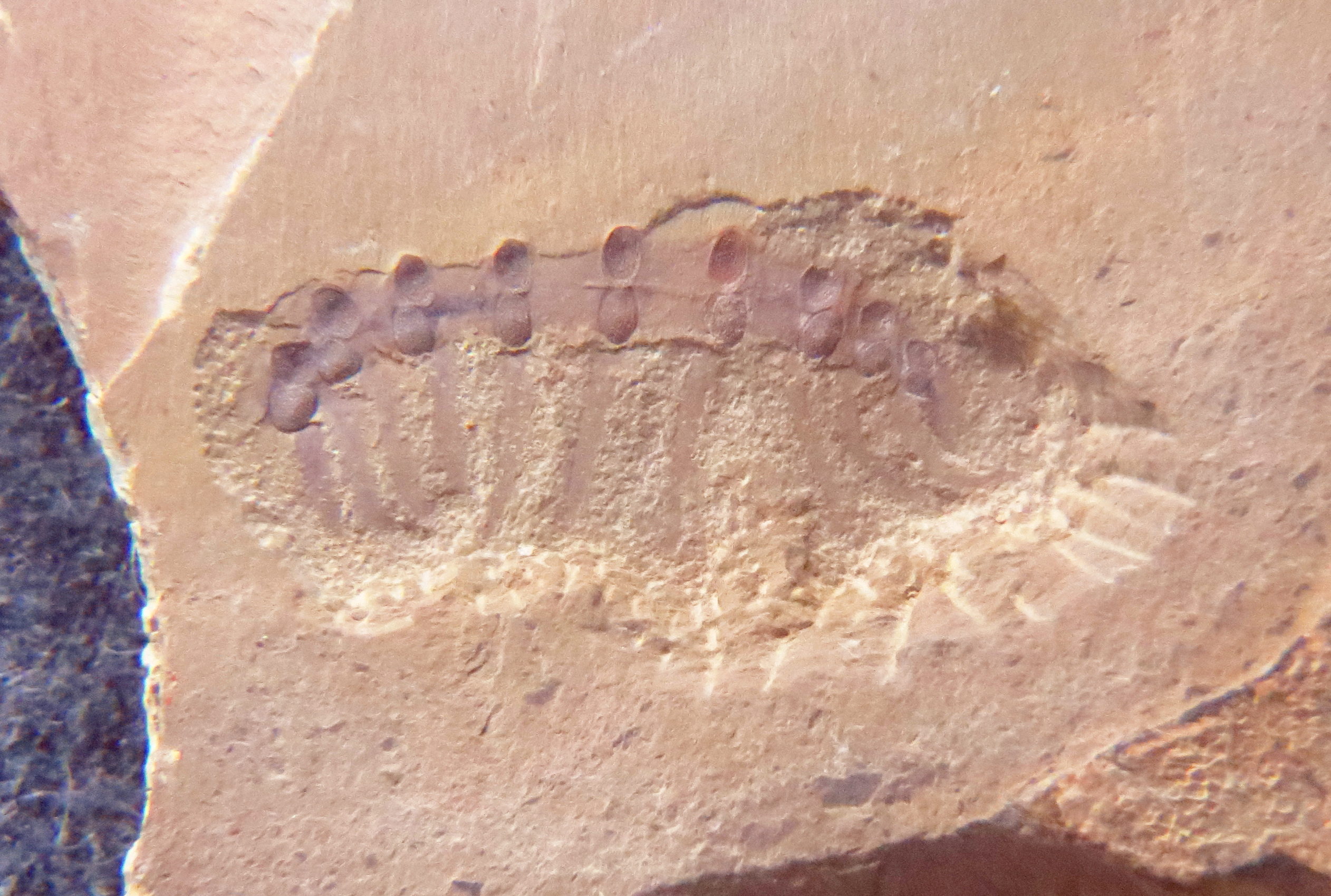
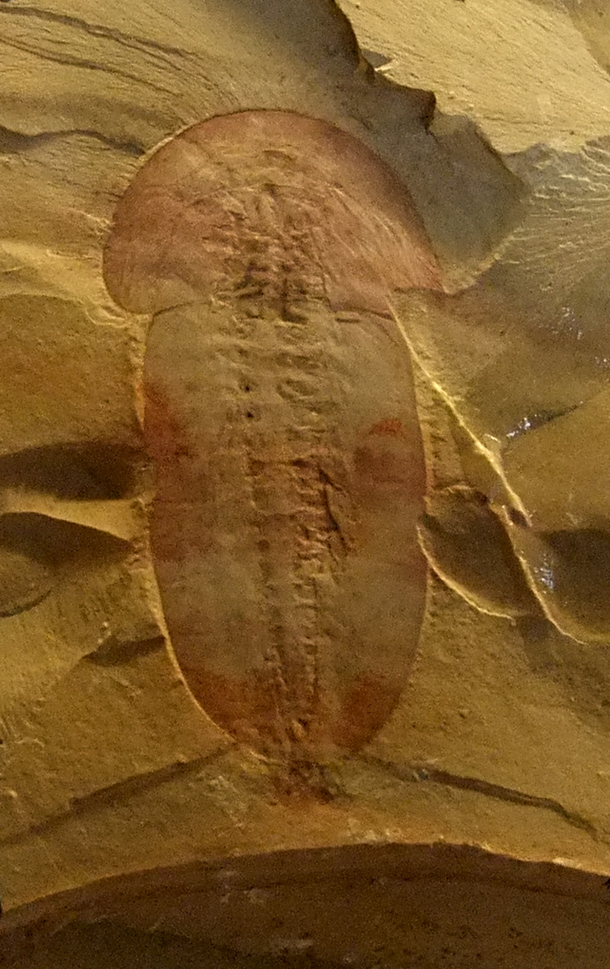
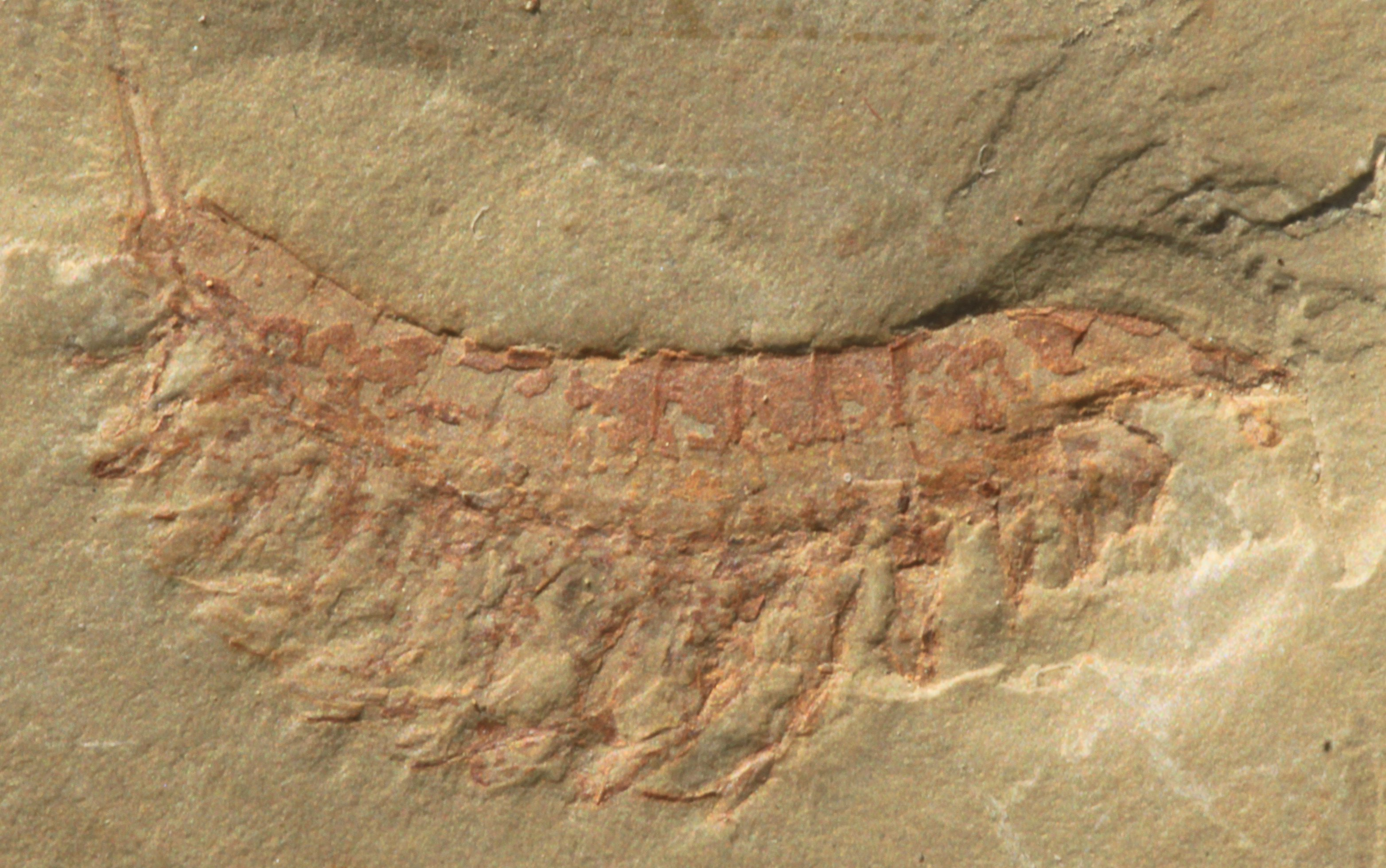
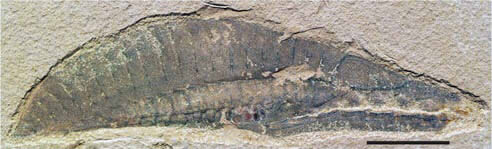
Clockwise from top left: Fuxianhuia, Orthrozanclus, Vetulicola, Misszhouia, Yunnanozoon, Leanchoilia, Microdictyon, Lyrarapax

There are several Cambrian fossil sites in the Chengjiang county of China's Yunnan province. The most significant is the Maotianshan shale, a lagerstätte which preserves soft tissues very well. The Chengjiang fauna date to between 525 million and 520 million years ago, about the middle of the early Cambrian epoch, a few million years after Sirius Passet and at least 10 million years earlier than the Burgess Shale.

The Chengjiang sediments provide what are currently the oldest-known chordates, the phylum to which all vertebrates belong. The 8 chordate species include Myllokunmingia, possibly a very primitive agnathid and Haikouichthys, which may be related to lampreys. Yunnanozoon may be the oldest-known hemichordate.

Anomalocaris was a mainly soft-bodied swimming predator which was gigantic for its time (up to 70 cm = 2¼ feet long; some later species were 3 times as long); the soft, segmented body had a pair of broad fin-like flaps along each side, except that the last 3 segments had a pair of fans arranged in a V shape. Unlike Kerygmachela and Pambdelurion (see above), Anomalocaris apparently had no legs, and the grooved patches which are thought to have acted as gills were at the bases of the flaps, or even overlapping on to its back. The two eyes were on relatively long horizontal stalks; the mouth lay under the head and was a round-cornered square of plates which could not close completely; and in front of the mouth were two jointed appendages which were shaped like a shrimp's body, curved backwards and with short spines on the inside of the curve. Amplectobelua, also found at Chengjiang, was similar, smaller than Anomalocaris but considerably larger than most other Chengjiang animals. Both are thought to have been powerful predators.

Hallucigenia looks like a long-legged caterpillar with spines on its back, and almost certainly crawled on the seabed.

Nearly half of the Chengjiang fossil species are arthropods, few of which had the hard, mineral-reinforced exoskeletons found in most later marine arthropods; only about 3% of the organisms known from Chengjiang have hard shells, and most of those are trilobites (although Misszhouia is a soft-bodied trilobite). Many other phyla are found there: Porifera (sponges) and Priapulida (burrowing "worms" which were ambush predators), Brachiopoda (these had bivalve-like shells, but fed by means of a lophophore, a fan-like filter which occupied about of half of the internal space), Chaetognatha (arrow worms), Cnidaria, Ctenophora (comb jellies), Echinodermata, Hyolitha (Lophophorata with small conical shells), Nematomorpha, Phoronida (horseshoe worms), and Protista.

=== Burgess Shale ===
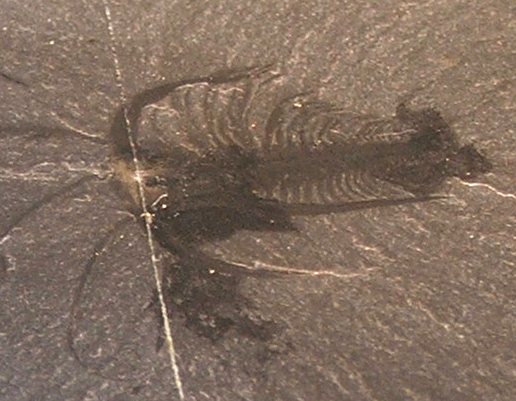
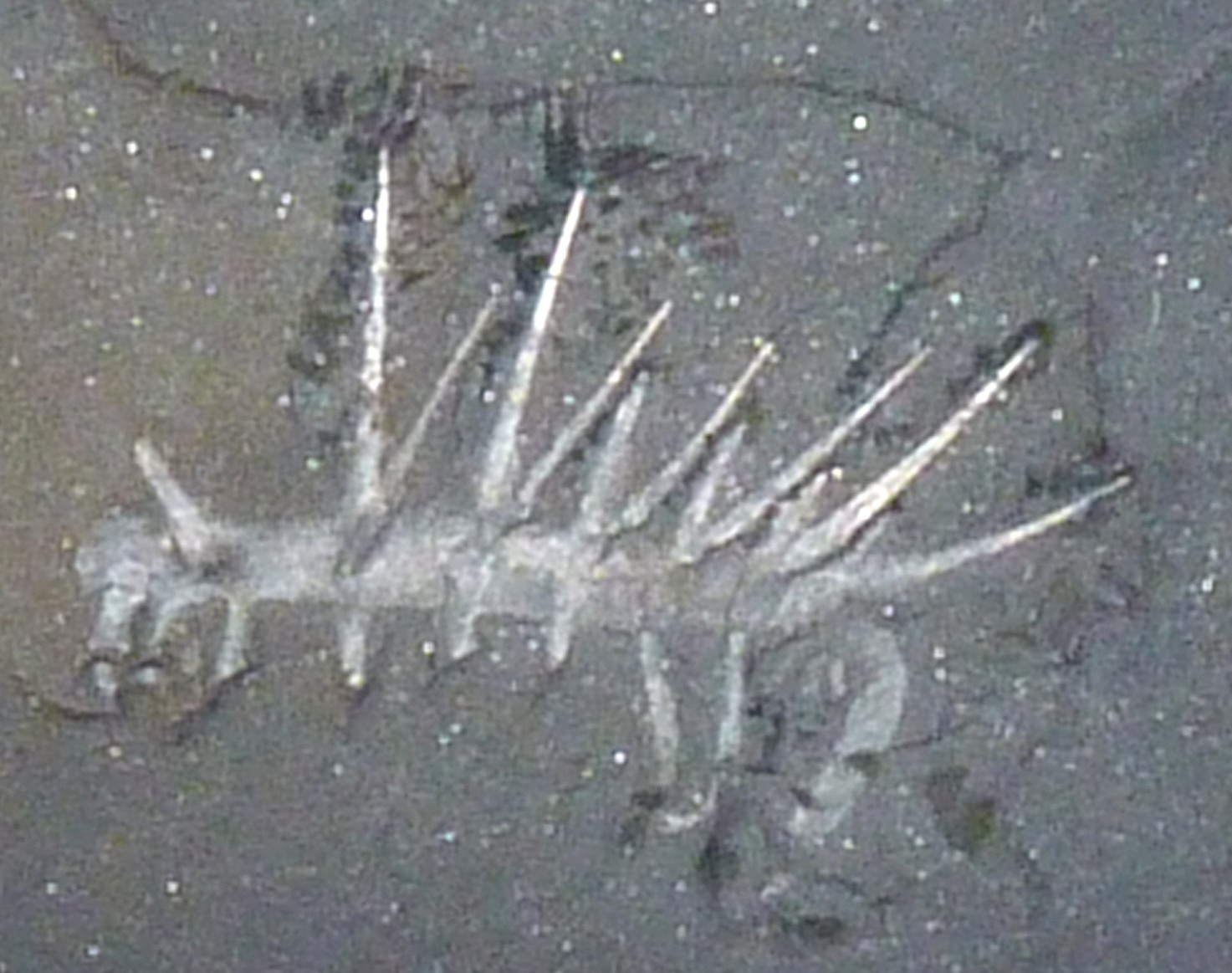
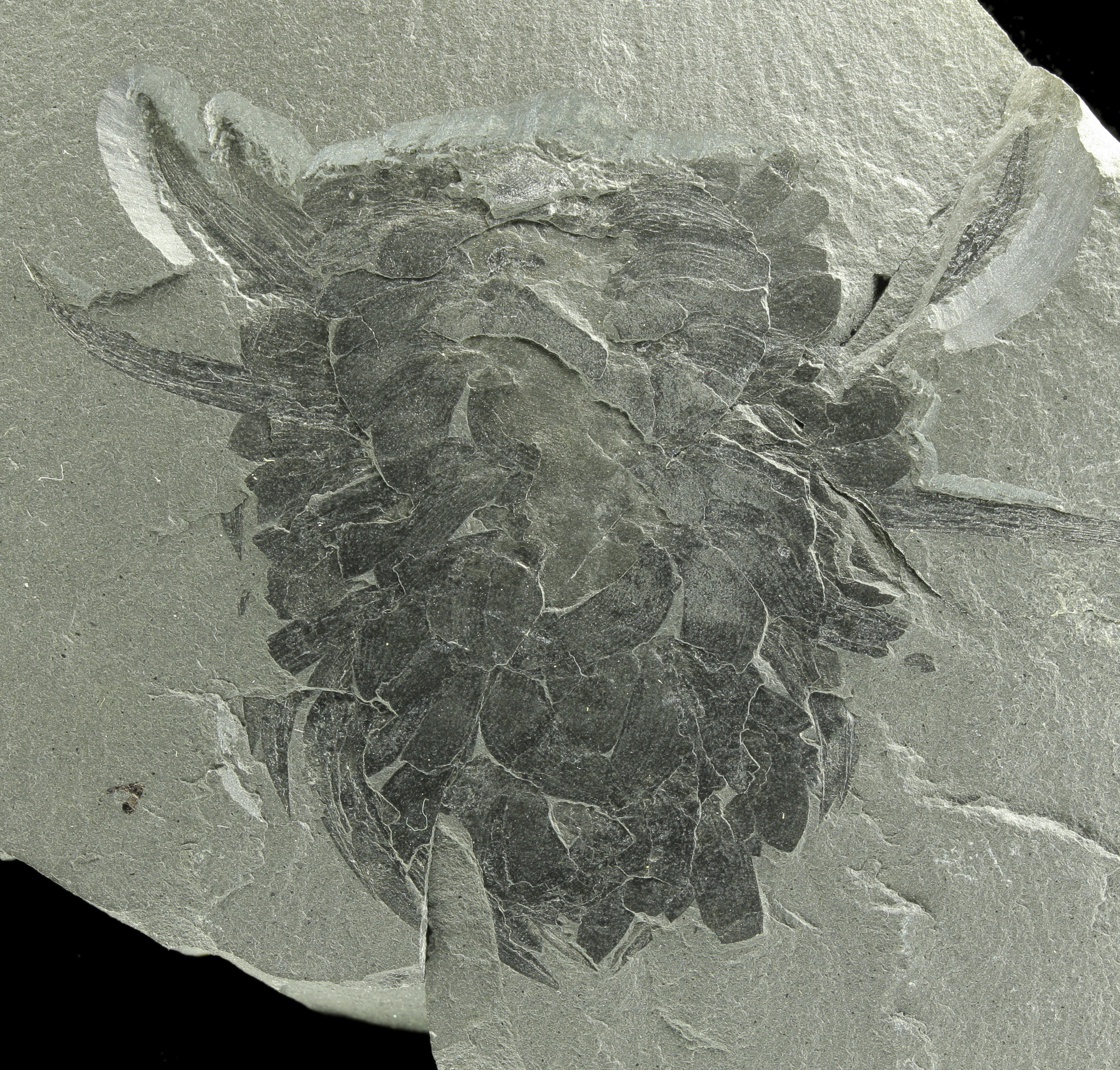
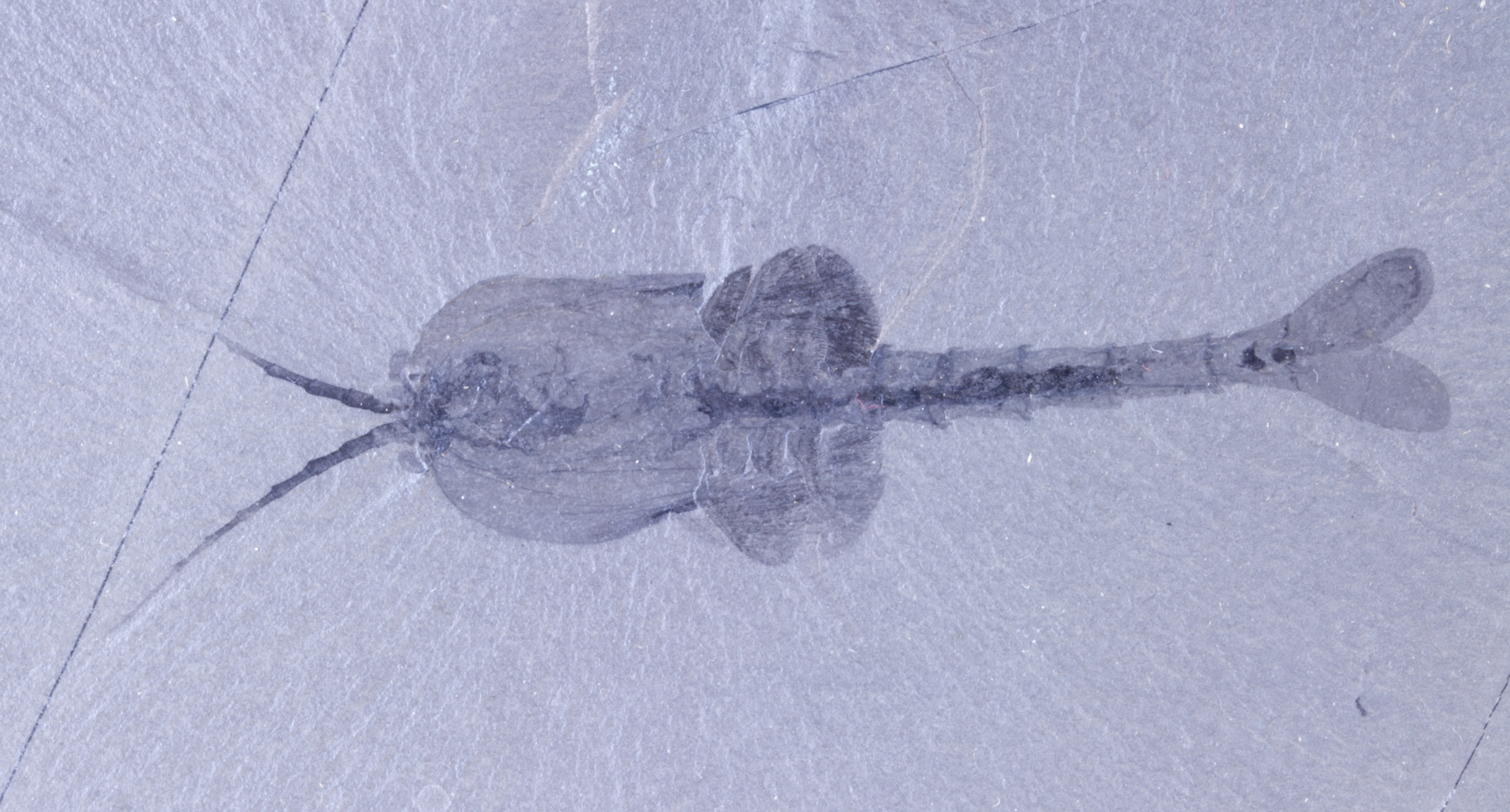
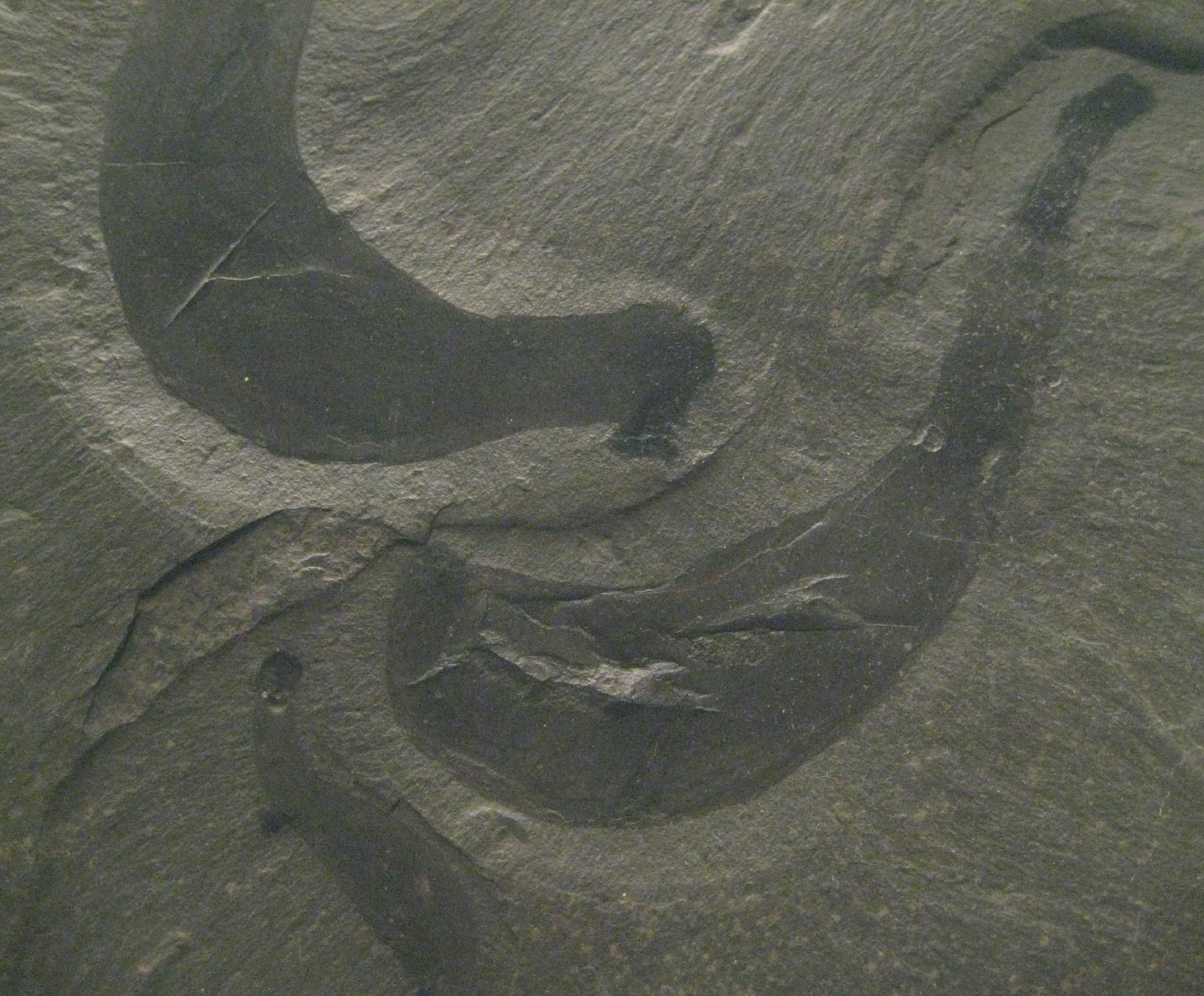
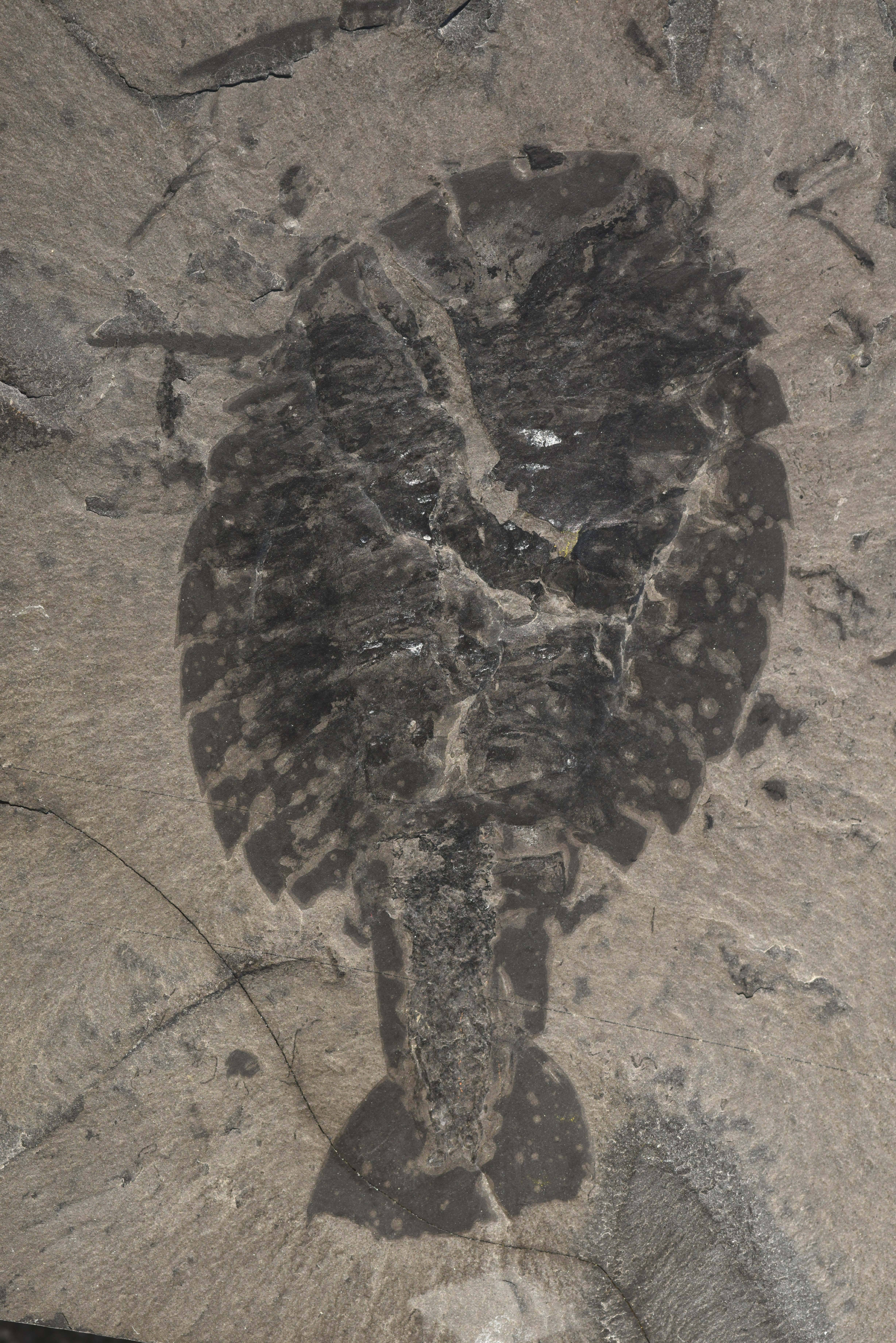
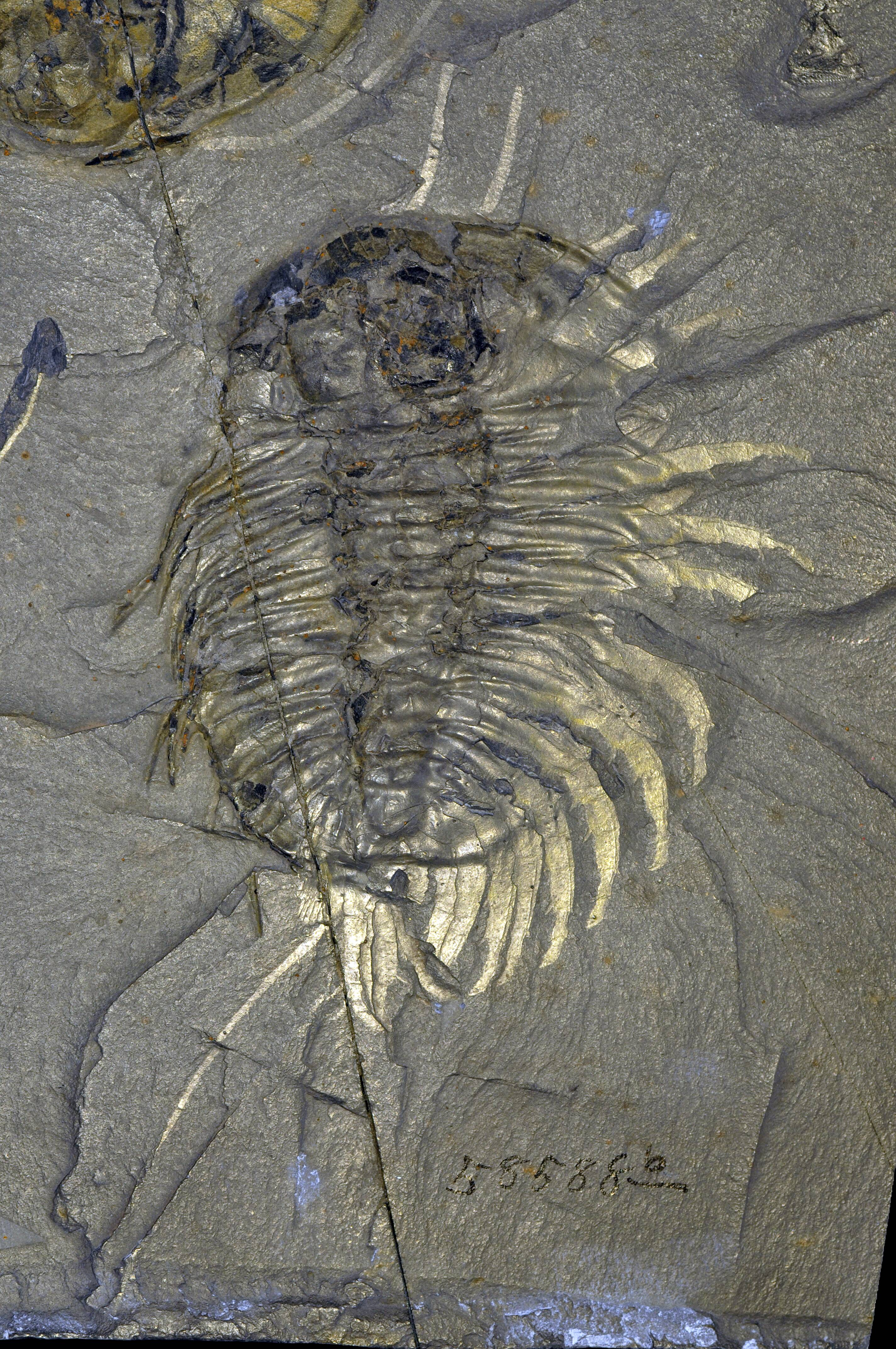
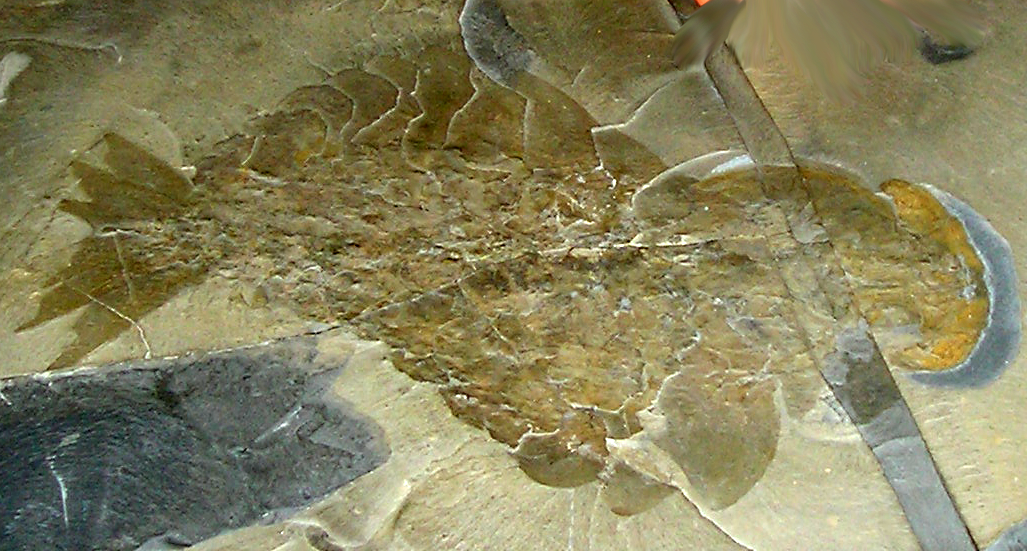
Clockwise from top left: Marrella, Hallucigenia, Waptia, Sidneyia, Anomalocaris, Olenoides, Ottoia, Wiwaxia

The Burgess Shale was the first of the Cambrian lagerstätten to be discovered (by Walcott in 1909), and the re-analysis of the Burgess Shale by Whittington and others in the 1970s was the basis of Gould's book Wonderful Life, which was largely responsible for non-scientists' awareness of the Cambrian explosion. The fossils date from the mid Cambrian, about 515 million years ago and 10 million years later than the Chengjiang fauna.

The shelled fossils in the Burgess Shale are similar in proportions to other shelly fossil deposits; however, they are a minor component of the biota, accounting for only 14% of the Burgess Shale fossils. When organisms that were not preserved are entered into the equation, the shelly fossils probably represent about 2% of the animals that were alive at the time.

Arthropods are the most abundant and diverse group of organisms in the Burgess Shale, followed closely by sponges. Many Burgess Shale fossils are unusual and difficult to classify, for example:

- Marrella is the most common fossil, but Whittington's re-analysis showed that it belonged to none of the known marine arthropod groups (trilobites, crustaceans, chelicerates).
- Yohoia was a tiny animal (7 mm to 23 mm long) with: a head shield; a slim, segmented body covered on top by armor plates; a paddle-like tail; 3 pairs of legs under the head shield; a single flap-like appendage fringed with setae under each body segment, probably used for swimming and/or respiration; a pair of relatively large appendages at the front of the head shield, each with a pronounced "elbow" and ending in four long spines which may have functioned as "fingers". Yohoia is assumed to have been a mainly benthic (bottom-dwelling) creature that swam just above the ocean floor and used its appendages to scavenge or capture prey. It may be a member of the arachnomorphs, a group of arthropods that includes the chelicerates and trilobites.
- Naraoia was a soft-bodied animal which is classified as a trilobite because its appendages (legs, mouth-parts) are very similar.
- Waptia, Canadaspis and Plenocaris had bivalve-like carapaces. It is uncertain whether these animals are related or acquired bivalve-like carapaces by convergent evolution.
- Molaria was a chelicerate-like arthropod with a long, narrow tail.
- Pikaia resembled the modern lancelet, and was the earliest-known chordate until the discovery of the fish-like Myllokunmingia and Haikouichthys among the Chengjiang fauna.

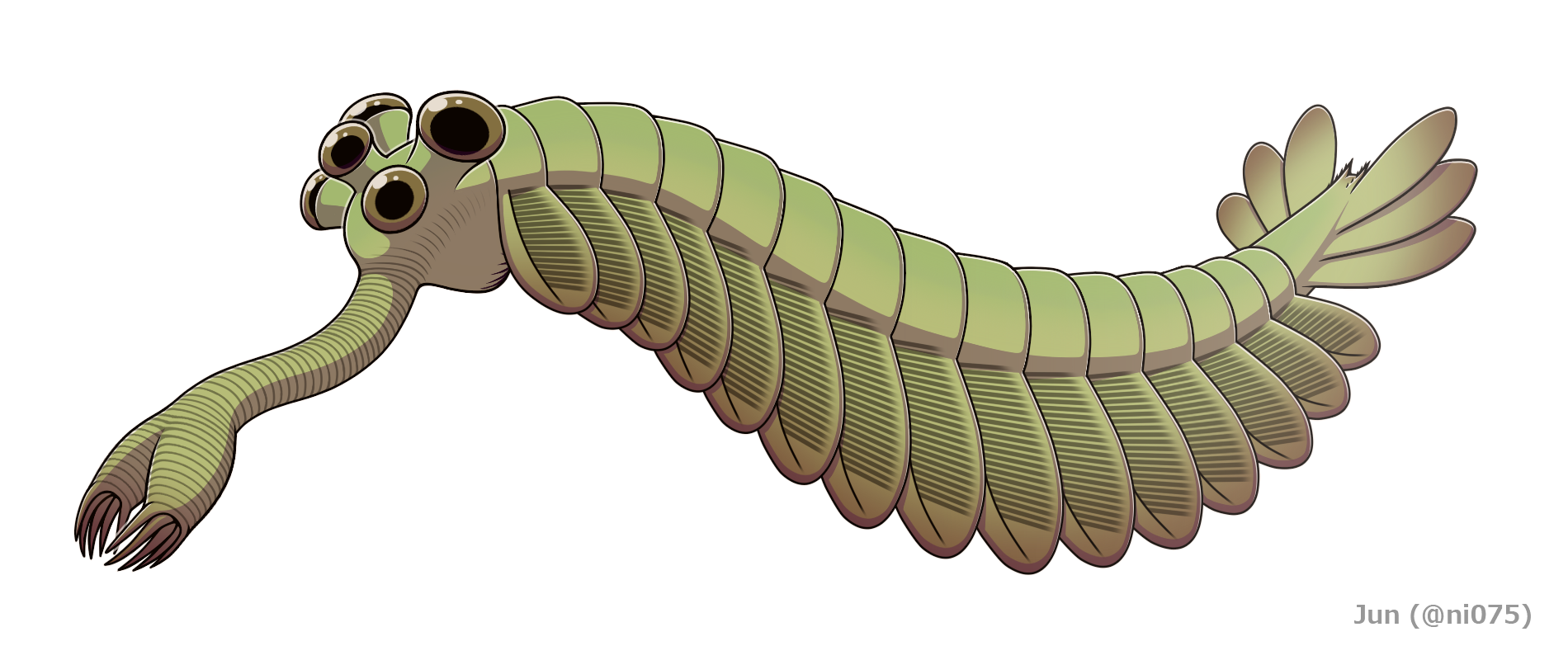
Reconstruction of Opabinia, one of the strangest animals from the Burgess Shale

But the "weird wonders", creatures that resembled nothing known in the 1970s, attracted the most publicity, for example:

- Whittington's first presentation about Opabinia made the audience laugh. The reconstruction showed a soft-bodied animal with: a slim, segmented body; a pair of flap-like appendages on each segment with gills above the flaps, except that the last 3 segments had no gills and the flaps formed a tail; five stalked eyes; a backward-facing mouth under the head; a long, flexible, hose-like proboscis which extended from under the front of the head and ended in a "claw" fringed with spines. Subsequent research has concluded that Opabinia is a lobopod, closely related to the arthropods and possibly even closer to ancestors of the arthropods.
- Anomalocaris and Hallucigenia were first found in the Burgess Shale, but older specimens have been found in the Chengjiang fauna. They are now regarded as lobopods, and Anomalocaris is very similar to Opabinia in most respects (except the eyes and feeding mechanisms)—see above.
- Odontogriphus is currently regarded as either a mollusc or a lophotrochozoan, i.e. fairly closely related to the ancestors of molluscs (see above).

=== Other fauna ===
Other fauna include the Middle Cambrian Wheeler Shale Formation of Utah.

== Ichnofauna ==
Trace fossils are associated with many Burgess Shale-type deposits. They are often associated with the innards of soft-bodied organisms, and are particularly prevalent under the carapaces of bivalved arthropods. Burrowing organisms seem to have used the high-sulfur decay fluids as a nutrient source when farming bacteria in the microenvironment under the carapaces, indicated by their repeated uses of individual burrows.

== Further sources ==
- Conway Morris, S. (1981). Taylor, M. E (ed.). "The Burgess Shale fauna as a mid-Cambrian community" (djvu). Short Papers for the Second International Symposium on the Cambrian System, 1981. Open-File Report. 81–743. U.S. Geological Survey: 47–49. USGS Library Call Number (200) R29o no.81-743.
