= Tylotites =

Tylotites Temporal range: Atdabanian–Cambrian Stage 4

Scientific classification
- Kingdom: Animalia
- Phylum: incertae sedis
- Class: †Palaeoscolecida
- Family: †Cricocosmiidae
- Genus: †Tylotites
- Species: †T. petiolaris

Binomial name
- †Tylotites petiolaris Luo and Hu 1999

Fossil genus of worm

Tylotites is an extinct genus of palaeoscolecid that lived during the Cambrian period. They existed approximately 525-506 million years ago and were likely epifaunal, living on the sediment-water interface in the ocean. Only one species, Tylotites petiolaris, is known.

== Classification and morphology ==
A part of the Chengjiang biota in Yunnan, China, T. petiolaris specimens are quite rare and were initially thought to be a member of Lobopodia. This belief was based on examination of an incomplete fossil. After the discovery of a complete specimen it was determined to be a part of Palaeoscolecida, due to the similarity of its proboscis with other members of the class. It was also previously thought that Tylotites was a part of a separate family, Tylotitidae, however more recent phylogenetic analysis has placed it in Cricocosmiidae.

T. petiolaris is cylindrical in shape, ranging from 4.5–7 mm (0.18–0.28 in) in width and 50–140 mm (2.0–5.5 in) in length at adulthood. It shares several characteristics with other members of Palaeoscolecida, such as a trisegmented proboscis, a ridged trunk, and an overall elongated shape. The proboscis in particular is reminiscent of those found in Cricocosmia and Maotianshania. There are three main components to the species' body: the proboscis, the neck, and the trunk.

The proboscis itself consists of three different segments, those being the introvert, the collar, and the pharynx. It was highly flexible, and covered with hooked spines used to collect food. The proboscis was then connected to the trunk by the neck. The trunk was also lined with numerous hooked spines, varying in length and function depending on their location. These spines were larger than those found on other species such as Cricocosmia, indicating they were probably for protection as well as for moving on the sea floor. There are a distinct pair of hooks protruding from the back end of the trunk as well, distinguished from the rest of the trunk spines by their colour and curvature.
