= Shaanxiscolex =

Shaanxiscolex Temporal range: Cambrian Stage 4

Scientific classification
- Kingdom: Animalia
- Class: Palaeoscolecida
- Family: Palaeoscolecidae
- Genus: Shaanxiscolex Yang et al., 2018

Binomial name
- Shaanxiscolex xixiangensis Yang et al., 2018

Genus of worms

Shaanxiscolex is an extinct genus of palaeoscolecid worm from the Cambrian Stage 4. The type species is Shaanxiscolex xixiangensis and was named in 2018 by Yang et al.

== See also ==
- 2018 in paleontology
