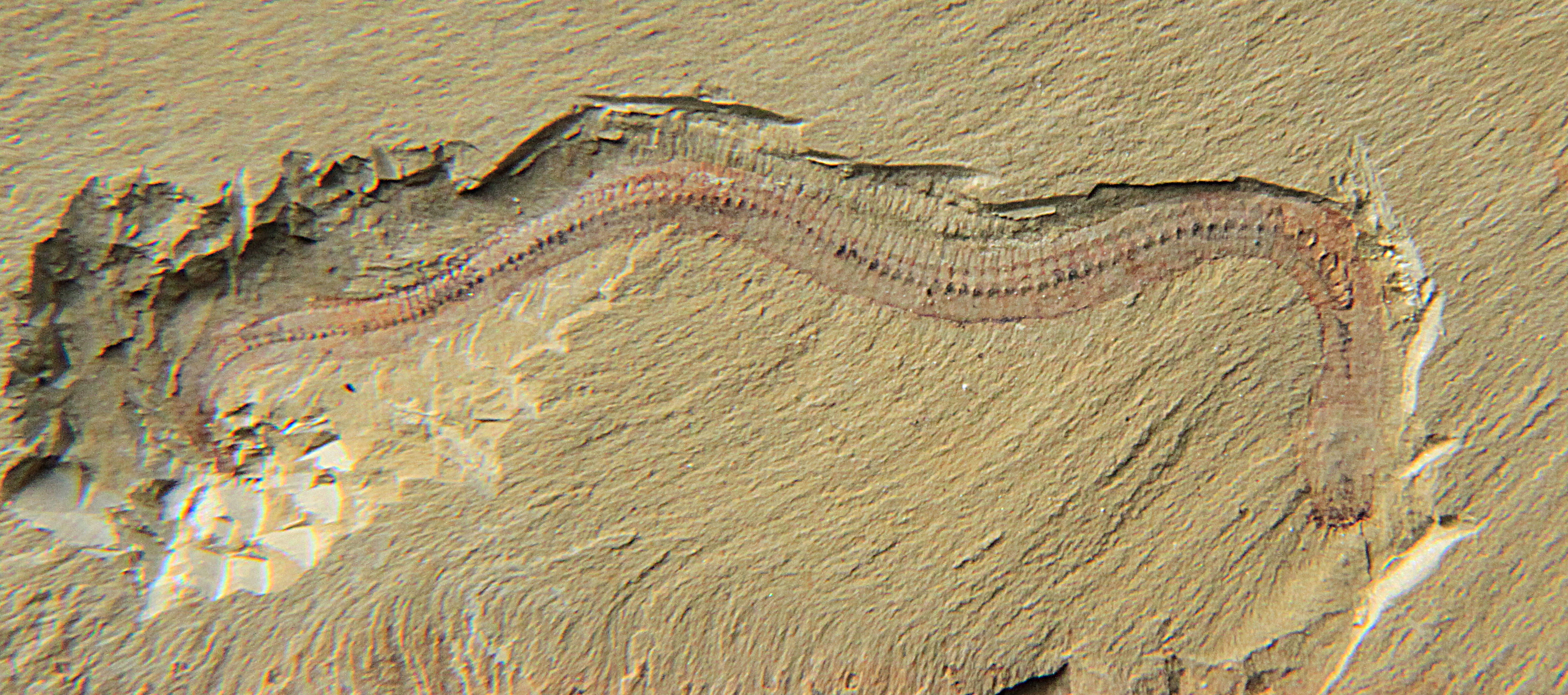

Scientific classification
- Kingdom: Animalia
- Phylum: incertae sedis
- Class: †Palaeoscolecida
- Family: †Cricocosmiidae
- Genus: †Maotianshania; Sun and Huo, 1987
- Species: †M. cylindrica

Binomial name
- †Maotianshania cylindrica Sun and Huo, 1987

= Maotianshania =

Maotianshania Temporal range: Atdabanian

Extinct genus of ecdysozoans

Maotianshania cylindrica is an extinct worm-like creature of average size (up to 4 centimetres or 1.6 inches long and 2 millimetres or 0.079 inches wide). It occurs in the Lower Cambrian (Atdabanian) Chengjiang biota of Northeastern Yunnan, China. It is usually preserved as pink impression. The gut is a dark central zone. The anterior pharynx and "collar", carry tiny sepia-colored teeth. The very back-end of the body has two small hooks.

== Etymology ==
Maotianshania has been named for the Maotianshan shales, home to the famous Chengjiang Lagerstätte.

== Description ==
Line drawing of Maotianshania cylindrica , highlighting anatomical details

The body of Maotianshania is worm-like, up to 4 cm in length and 2 mm wide, having 3-4 rings (or annuli) per mm. Like its relatives Cricocosmia and Palaeoscolex, it is usually preserved as a very thin pink impression on the buff-colored matrix that is characteristic for the Maotianshan shales. The front of the body consists of a presumably protrusive and retractable elongate pharynx, armed with tooth- or spine-like outgrowths, arranged in rows and circles and which stand alternately between adjacent rings with the mouth at the very tip. Behind the pharynx is a collar-like "introvert" which also has rows of hooks, spines or scalids. The scalids of the first circle of the introvert form a so-called corona and are remarkably larger than the succeeding scalids. The gut is a simple tube, that often stands out as a darker central canal through the entire length of the body. The teeth, hooks and spines on the pharynx and introvert are sepia-colored, as are two small curved hooks at the very back-end of the body.

== Ecology ==
Living scalidophorans use their introvert for movement and the pharynx to swallow prey, which is assumed to be true for Maotianshania too. The inwardly curved pharyngeal spines prevent prey from escaping, while the spines on the introvert (or scalids), may serve to anchor the body to the environment when pulling it forward. The life habit of Maotianshania is most likely creeping on the seafloor (epibenthic) or living in the sandy or muddy top layer. It seem unlikely the animal has been burrowing vertical into the sediment. A predatory life is plausible, also given that no sediment is contained in the gut.
