= Arrakiscolex =

Arrakiscolex Temporal range: Drumian

Scientific classification
- Domain: Eukaryota
- Kingdom: Animalia
- Class: †Palaeoscolecida
- Genus: †Arrakiscolex; Leibach et al., 2021
- Species: †A. aasei

Binomial name
- †Arrakiscolex aasei Leibach et al., 2021

Extinct genus of worms

Arrakiscolex is a genus of Cambrian palaeoscolecid, the first known from the Marjum Formation in Utah; some specimens from the Weeks Formation could be tentatively assigned to this genus. The holotype has a width of 3.95 millimetres (0.16 in) and a length of 38.14 millimetres (1.50 in). The only species is Arrakiscolex aasei. The genus name is inspired by the fictional planet of Arrakis in Frank Herbert novel Dune, inhabited by giant sandworms.

Arrakiscolex is distinguished by small, discoid plates distributed over the surface of the preserved cuticle fragments. The plates are smooth with a well-differentiated marginal rim, differentiating them from other genera with larger or differently shaped plates.
