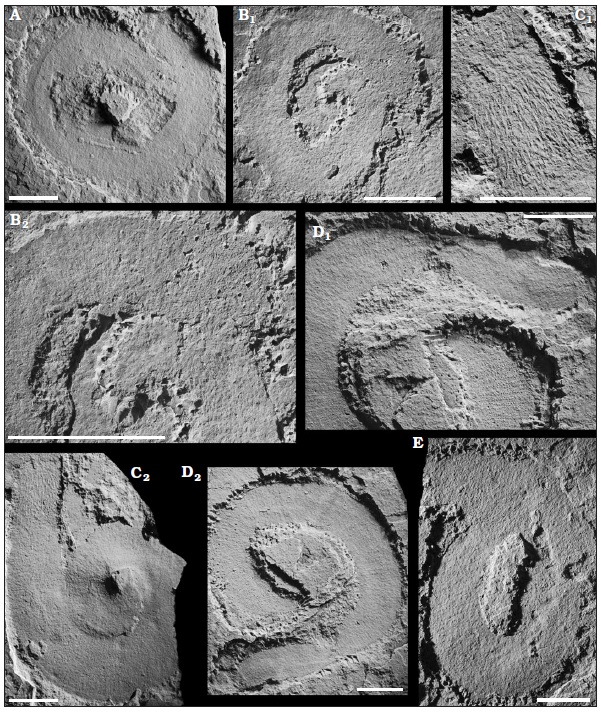
- fossils

Scientific classification
- Kingdom: Animalia
- Phylum: incertae sedis
- Class: †Palaeoscolecida
- Family: †Chalazoscolecidae; Conway Morris & Peel, 2010
- Genus: †Xystoscolex; Conway Morris & Peel, 2010

Species
- X. boreogyrus Conway Morris & Peel 2010 (type)

= Xystoscolex =

Xystoscolex Temporal range: Lower Cambrian

Extinct genus of worms

Xystoscolex is a genus of palaeoscolecidian worm known from the Sirius Passet, North Greenland.

== Etymology ==
The generic name is a portmanteau of the greek word xystos meaning smooth, and colex, a suffix often used for scolecidan worm taxa.
