= Milaculum =

Milaculum Temporal range: Middle Cambrian – Early Silurian

Scientific classification
- Domain: Eukaryota
- Kingdom: Animalia
- Class: †Palaeoscolecida
- Genus: †Milaculum; Müller, 1973

Extinct genus of worms

The genus Milaculum was erected to contain isolated plates that have since been identified as components of palaeoscolecid worms. They are adorned with regularly arranged humps that recall the arrangement of holes in Microdictyon. The plates are sometimes found in association with palaeoscolecid cuticle.
