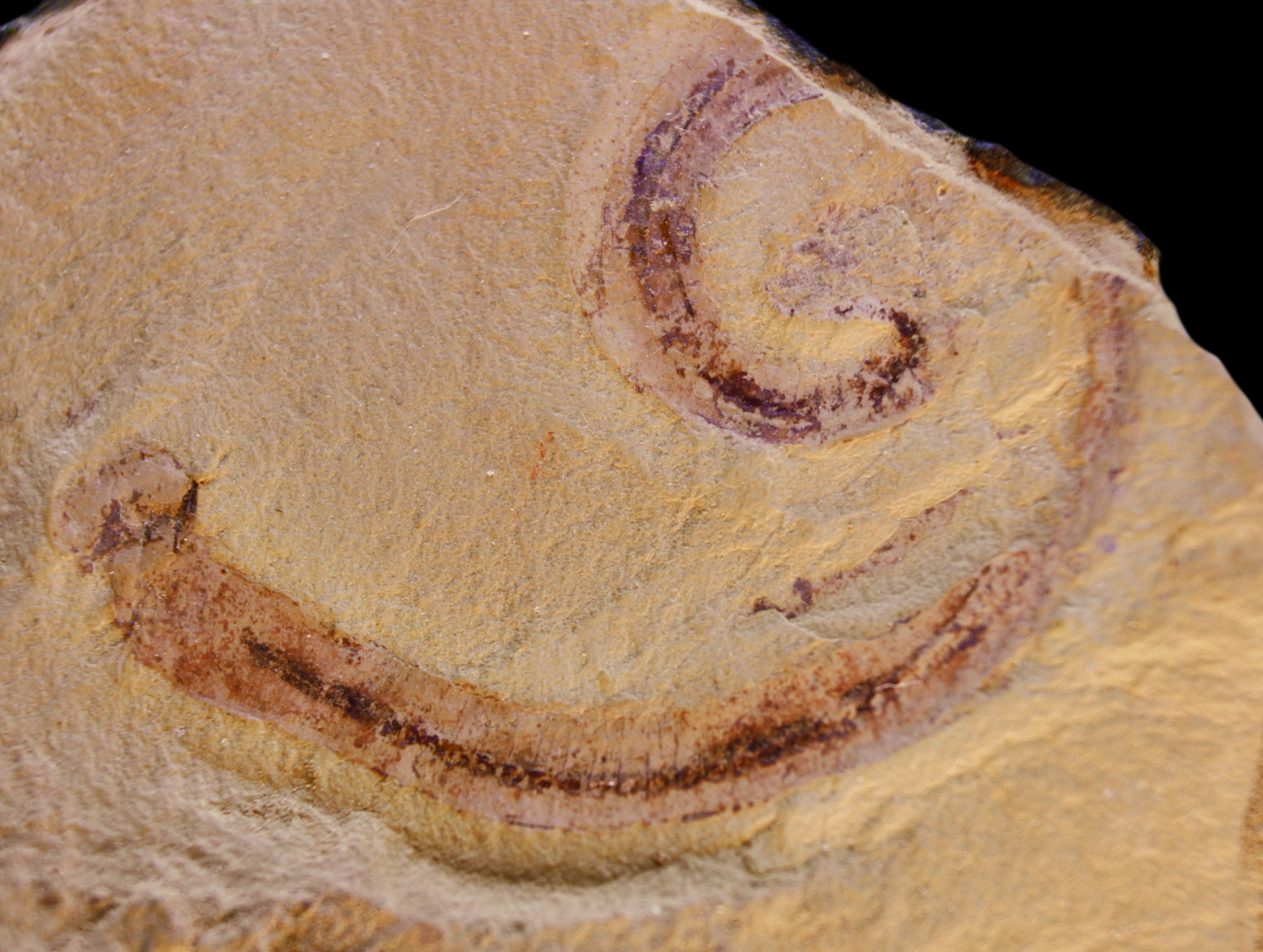
- Fossil specimen of Cricocosmia jinningensis

Scientific classification
- Kingdom: Animalia
- Phylum: incertae sedis
- Class: †Palaeoscolecida
- Family: †Cricocosmiidae
- Genus: †Cricocosmia
- Species: †C. jinningensis

Binomial name
- †Cricocosmia jinningensis Hou & Sun, 1988

= Cricocosmia =

Cricocosmia Temporal range: Chengjiang

Extinct genus of worms

Cricocosmia is an abundant palaeoscolecid worm endemic to the Early Cambrian Chengjiang Biota of Yunnan, China. It resembles modern priapulids, and holds a pivotal role in understanding the evolution of early ecdysozoans. It possessed paired lateral sclerites and paired ventral projections which have been compared with early panarthropod legs. It was a detritivore, living in shallow horizontal burrows, sometimes in great concentration.

== Description ==
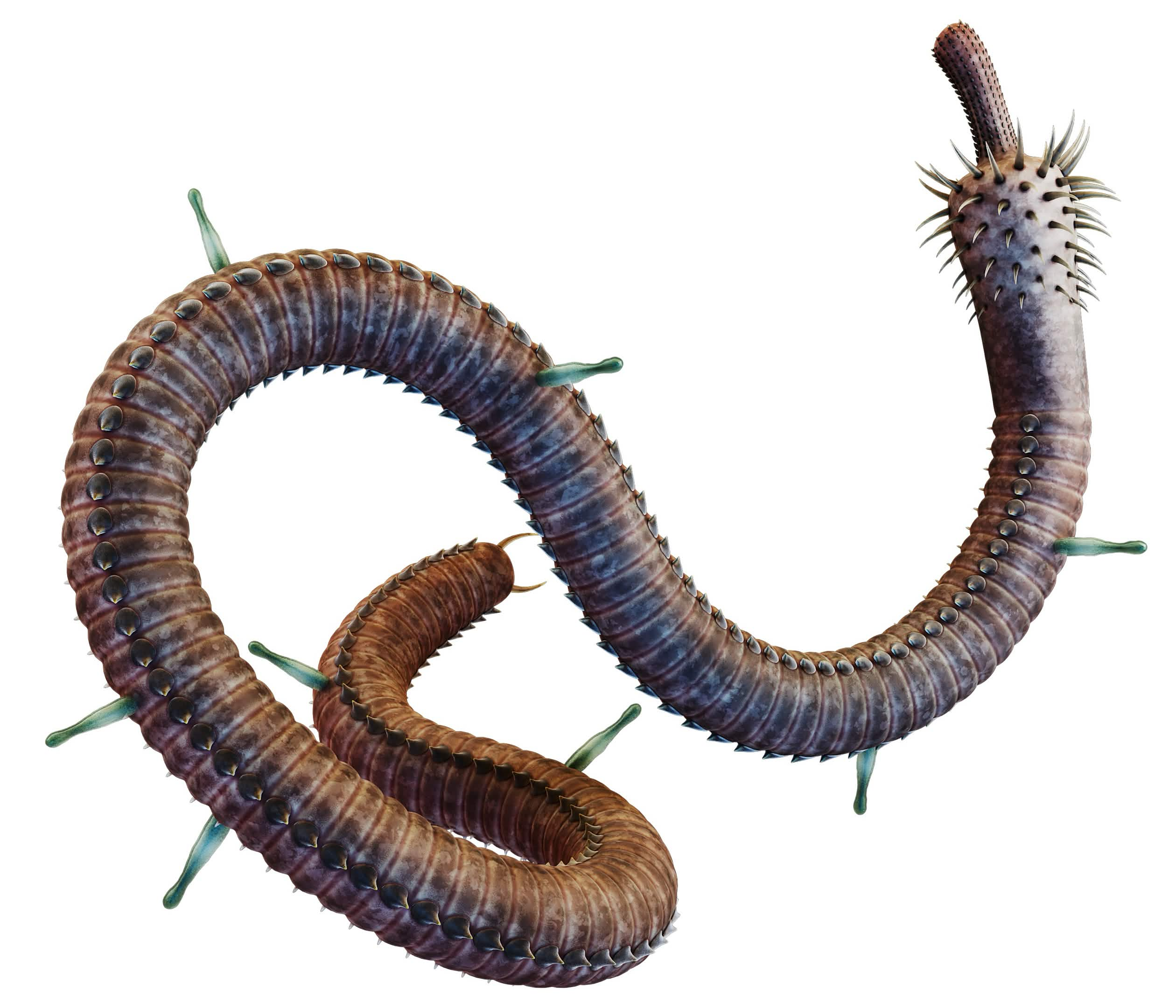
Reconstruction of Cricocosmia jinningensis, infested with Inquicus fellatus.

Cricocosmia specimens are easily identified by two rows of small dorso-lateral sclerites. There were a single pair of sclerites for every annulus of the trunk, beginning a short distance from the smooth introvert. These sclerite rows were bilaterally symmetrical, and consisted of a round base with a surrounding marginal rim, and a thorn-like spine projecting outwards and posteriorly. The first sclerite pair of the trunk were smaller than the succeeding pair - following this, the sclerites follow a pattern of becoming smaller and more circular, with a taller and more strongly defined spine, towards the posterior. The whole surface of the sclerite was covered in a mesh of microscopic, slanted tubercules, which become smaller towards the tip (these correspond to round pits on the internal face of the sclerite). The sclerites are thought to have been no more than 10 μm in thickness (slightly less than modern plastic wrap).

For every third pair of sclerites, there are also small, unsclerotized, teardrop shaped spines or projections ventrally. These are also directed posteriorly. Similar ventral projections are found in Mafangscolex, Tabelliscolex, Houscolex, and possibly Tylotites. These repeated ventral projections are theorized to be possibly homologous (although possibly convergent, evolving independently but acting on a similar genetic 'toolkit') with early panarthropod legs. The introvert had a collar of about 5 rows of long, curved scalid spines. The everted proboscis was lined with many rows of pharyngeal teeth, which vary in size, shape, and density down the length of the proboscis. The end of the trunk had a pair of hook-like spines. A simple gut ran through the entire length of the body, and the animal probably relied on a hydrostatic skeleton to move, like modern priapulids.

== Ecology ==
Cricocosmia, with its single known species C. jinningensis, is the most abundant species of worm, and one of the most abundant species overall, found in the Chengjiang Biota. Cricocosmia was endo-benthic and lived in short sac-like burrows, open at both ends and often multiple times wider and sometimes slightly shorter than the worm itself. The burrows were constructed nearly horizontal and parallel with the seafloor, only slightly oblique with one end of the burrow closer to the surface, as opposed to burrowing vertically. The burrows were well delineated from the surrounding sediment, suggesting that they were also consolidated by the worm, possibly by secretion of a fluid which bound the sediment like glue, preventing the burrow from collapsing. Cricocosmia was not a permanenet burrower, however, as there is evidence they sometimes left their burrows to crawl along the seabed surface (possibly aided by the paired ventral projections). Such evidence includes certain specimens infested with the symbiotic organism Inquicus. Crawling traces left by Crircocosmia are relatively straight, as opposed to sinuous and snake-like.

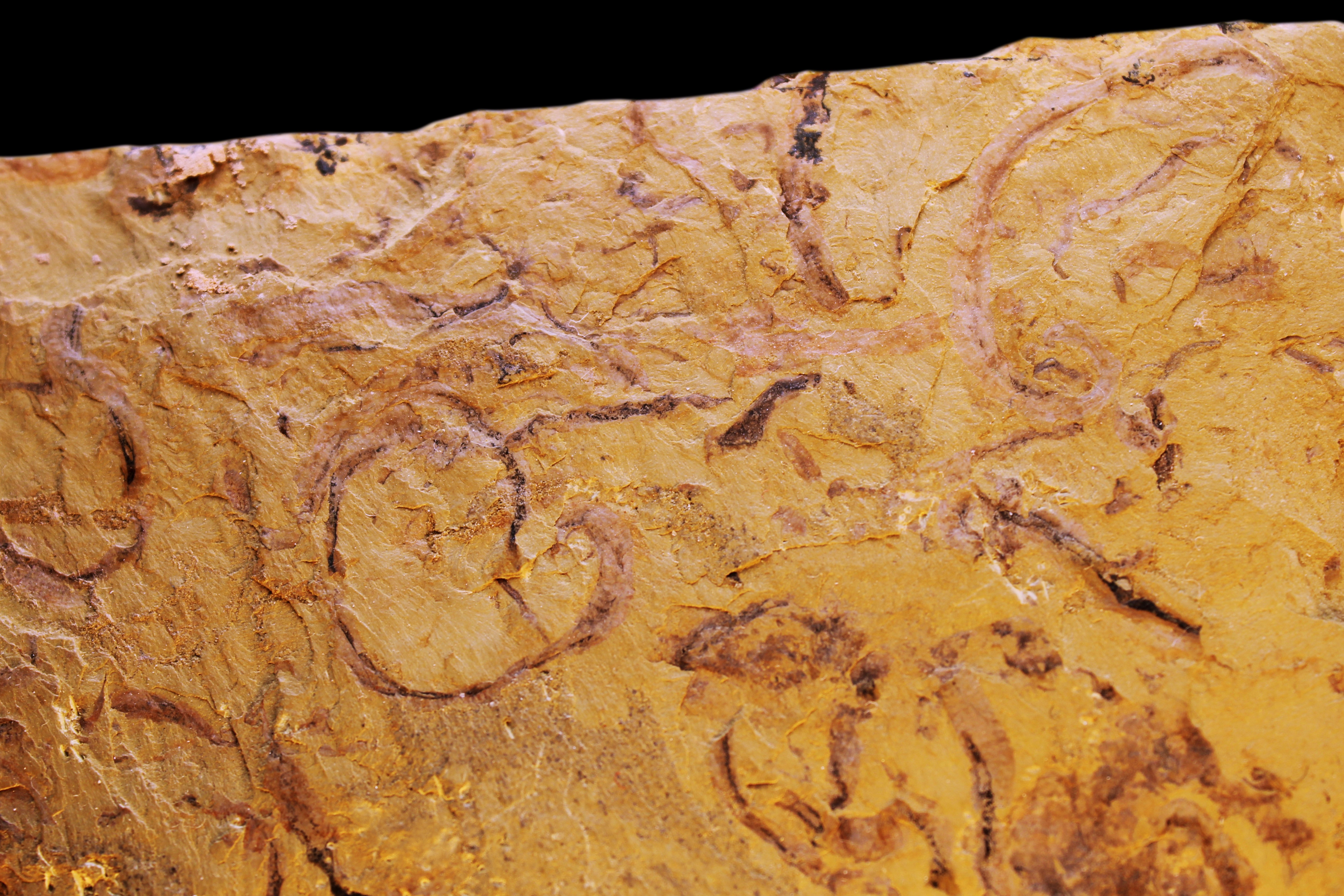
A concentrated assemblage of Cricocosmia jinningensis. Such assemblages are composed of living worms as well as dead and decaying specimens, which typically appear distorted or indistinct. It is unlikely that such assemblages represent the true density of live worms.

The gut of Cricocosmia is preserved as a flat, organic-rich carbon film, without any recognizable gut contents or infilling, indicating a diet of soft detritus resting on the seabed as opposed to active predation or deposit feeding. The small pharyngeal teeth could have scraped decaying animals or algae to feed. Cricocosmia are sometimes found in massive clusters on the same bedding plane, suggesting that they may have congregated in areas with excellent chemical conditions or high food concentration. These assemblages are mostly adults and subadults, with a few juveniles. The assemblages also contain a small number of Mafangscolex, various lobopodians (Paucipodia, Microdictyon, and an indeterminate siberiid), and almost no arthropods.

A small number of specimens have been preserved in the process of moulting. First, the new cuticle was formed beneath the old layer - the worm then struggled within the old cuticle, displacing and staggering the sclerites, before breaking free through the anterior end (introvert and proboscis). This process allowed the animal to grow, and in adulthood, presumably assisted in removing parasites which remained attached to the old cuticle. The lateral sclerites, which were probably used to burrow into the sediment and acted as anchors, prevent the worm from slipping backwards, were constantly being abraded by the sediment, observable in fossils as a dulling of the sclerite overall. Thus, moulting would have also renewed the worn-down sclerites.

== See also ==
- Maotianshan shales fossils
- Tabelliscolex
