= Sanduscolex =

Sanduscolex Temporal range: Early Ordovician

Scientific classification
- Domain: Eukaryota
- Kingdom: Animalia
- Class: †Palaeoscolecida
- Family: †Palaeoscolecidae
- Genus: †Sanduscolex
- Species: †S. regularis

Binomial name
- †Sanduscolex regularis Muir et al 2014

Extinct genus of Ordovician animals

Sanduscolex is a genus of lower Ordovician palaeoscolecid.
