= Ashetscolex =

Ashetscolex Temporal range: Early Ordovician

Scientific classification
- Domain: Eukaryota
- Kingdom: Animalia
- Class: †Palaeoscolecida
- Family: †Palaeoscolecidae
- Genus: †Ashetscolex
- Species: †A. nuppus

Binomial name
- †Ashetscolex nuppus Muir et al 2014

Extinct genus of worms

Ashetscolex is a genus of lower Ordovician palaeoscolecid.
