= Tabelliscolex =

Tabelliscolex Temporal range: Chengjiang

Scientific classification
- Domain: Eukaryota
- Kingdom: Animalia
- Class: †Palaeoscolecida
- Family: †Cricocosmiidae
- Genus: †Tabelliscolex

Extinct genus of worms

Tabelliscolex is a genus of palaeoscolecid worm from the Early Cambrian Chengjiang biota that comprises two species, T. hexagonus and T. maanshanensis.

== See also ==
- Paleobiota of the Maotianshan Shales
