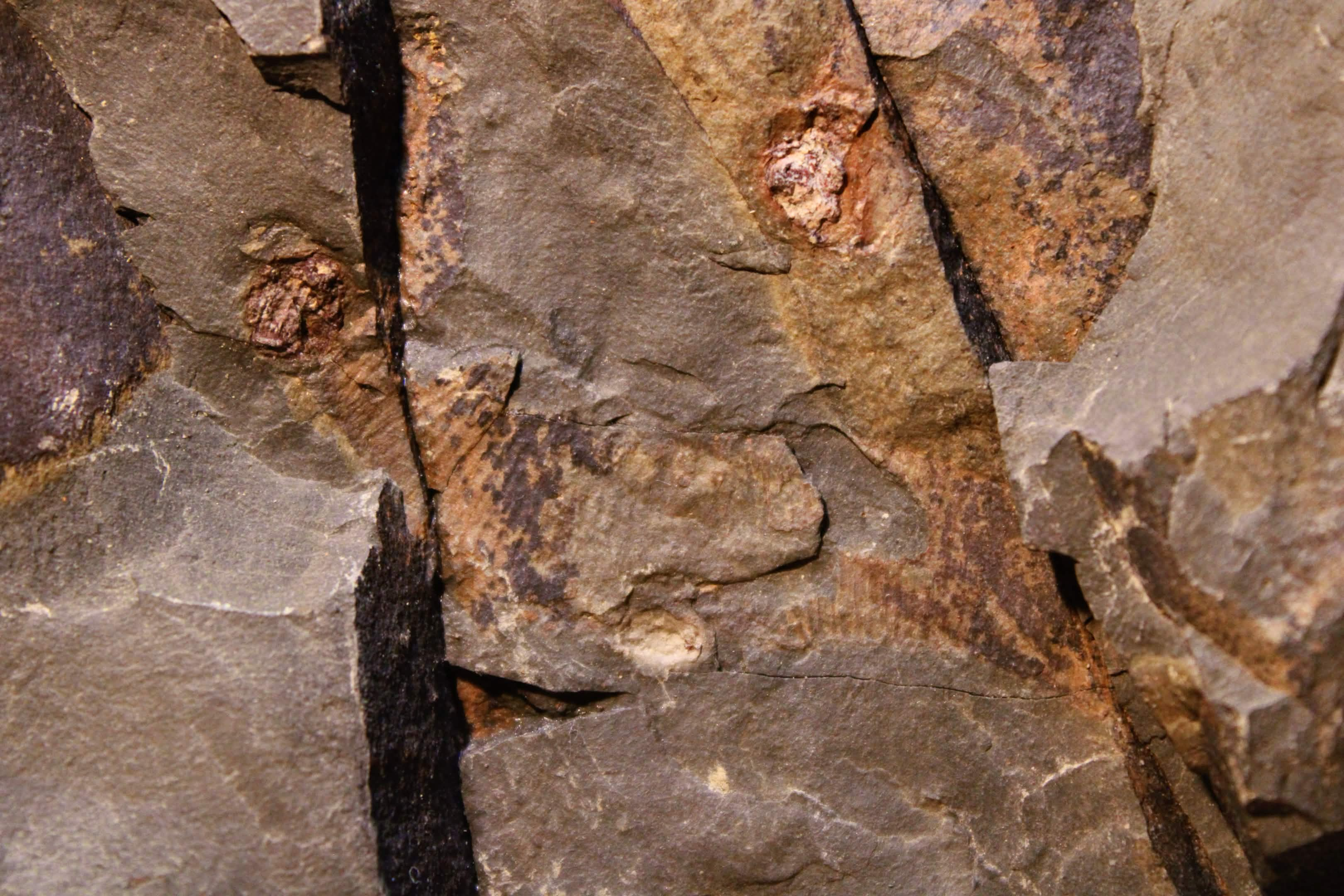
- Specimen of Palaeoscolex? tenerensis from the Ordovician-age Fezouata Formation

Scientific classification
- Kingdom: Animalia
- Phylum: incertae sedis
- Class: †Palaeoscolecida
- Family: †Palaeoscolecidae
- Genus: †Palaeoscolex

= Palaeoscolex =

Extinct genus of worms

Palaeoscolex is the type genus of the Palaeoscolecid worms, and served as a wastebasket taxon. until its taxonomy was revised and many of its taxa assigned to Wronascolex.

The type and only unequivocal species is P. piscatorum, known from mid-trunk segments.
