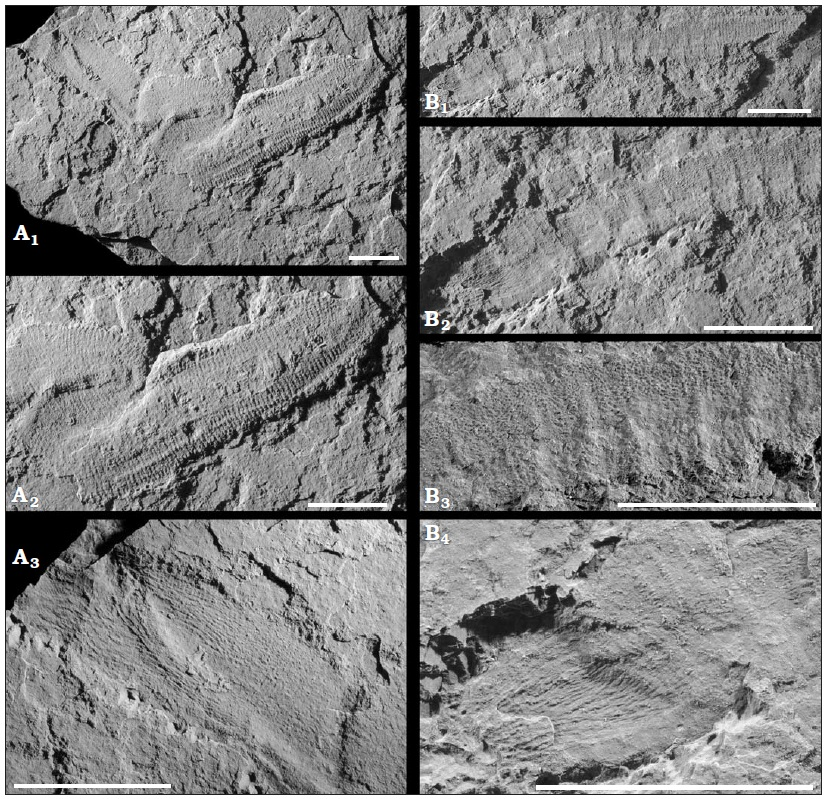

Scientific classification
- Kingdom: Animalia
- Phylum: incertae sedis
- Class: †Palaeoscolecida
- Family: †Chalazoscolecidae; Conway Morris & Peel, 2010
- Genus: †Chalazoscolex; Conway Morris & Peel, 2010

Species
- C. pharkus Conway Morris & Peel 2010 (type)

= Chalazoscolex =

Chalazoscolex Temporal range: Sirius Passet

Extinct genus of worms

Chalazoscolex is a genus of palaeoscolecidian worm known from the Sirius Passet. It had around 140 segments, each adorned with two rows of palaeoscolecid plates. Its body was organised into three transverse sections, the medial bearing three large sclerites acrosswise, the laterals bearing ridges.

== Etymology ==
The generic name comes from the Greek word chalazas meaning hail and sleet but also pimple and tubercle. This was a reference to the tubercular-textured surfaces of the fossils and polar locality of the members of the genus.
