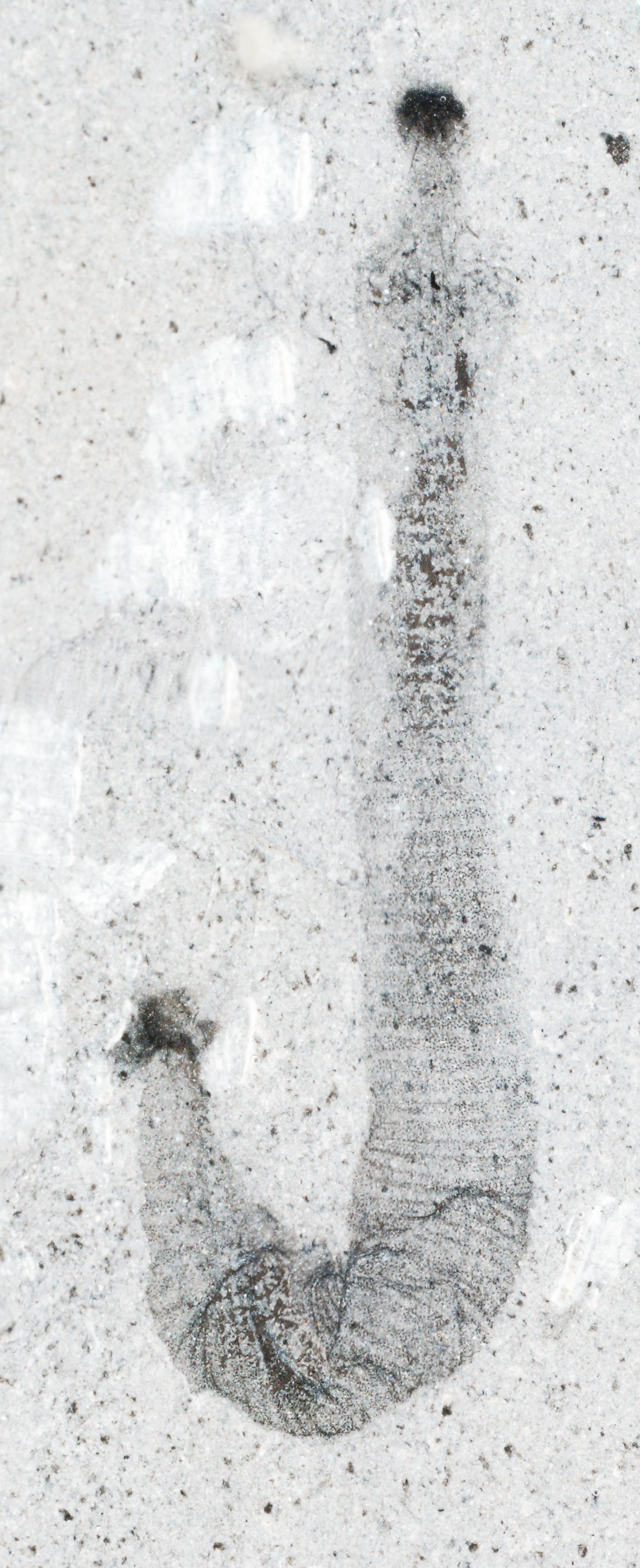
- The Burgess Shale palaeoscolecid Scathascolex minor. Image from Smith (2015)

Scientific classification
- Kingdom: Animalia
- Subkingdom: Eumetazoa
- Clade: ParaHoxozoa
- Clade: Bilateria
- Clade: Nephrozoa
- Clade: Protostomia
- Superphylum: Ecdysozoa
- Phylum: incertae sedis
- Class: †Palaeoscolecida; Conway Morris & Robinson, 1986

Families, genera and species (sensu Harvey et al. 2010)
- See text

= Palaeoscolecid =

Palaeoscolecida Temporal range: Upper Early Cambrian–Ludfordian

Extinct class of worms

The palaeoscolecids are a group of extinct ecdysozoan worms resembling armoured priapulids. They are known from the Lower Cambrian to the lower Ludfordian (late Silurian); they are mainly found as disarticulated sclerites, but are also preserved in many of the Cambrian lagerstätten. They take their name from the typifying genus Palaeoscolex. Other genera include Cricocosmia from the Lower Cambrian Chengjiang biota. Their taxonomic affinities within Ecdysozoa have been the subject of debate.

== Morphology ==
Palaeoscolecids bear an annulated trunk ornamented with circular patterns of phosphatic tesselating plates; a layered cuticle; and an armoured proboscis. They are long and narrow, and can reach tens of centimetres in length. Their cuticle is annulated, typically in complete rings, but sometimes the rings split or only encircle part of the trunk. Each annulus is essentially identical to its neighbours; the only trunk differentiation is at the anterior and posterior. The anterior is radially symmetrical, typically comprising an introvert, whereas the trunk is bilaterally symmetrical. The posterior hosts the terminal anus and sometimes one or two hooks. There is no one character that unites the palaeoscolecids as a clade (indeed they are likely paraphyletic), and few individual specimens contain all characteristic palaeosolecid traits.

== Growth ==
Palaeoscolecids can grow by the continuous addition of plates, or by the continued growth of individual plates.

== Taxonomic position ==
Palaeoscolecids are somewhat challenging to define, and probably represent a paraphyletic grouping. Their most current systematic diagnosis references their annulated worm-like body form, the presence of rows (usually) of phosphatic plates, and a straight gut, with the anus at the end of the animal. The group contains a wide and continuous spectrum of morphological variety, making further division of the group difficult; moreover, non-palaeoscolecid taxa likely evolved from palaeoscolecid-like ancestors, and it is thus difficult to demarcate a single clade that corresponds to the palaeoscolecid concept.

Life reconstruction of Avannaascolex apalos, a lower Cambrian palaeoscolecid from the Sirius Passet Fauna

They are considered by some to belong to the Cycloneuralia, although their position within this group is unresolved; they may lie with the priapulids or Nematomorpha.

They have also been described as a sister-group to the Ecdysozoa, although as more characters are described a position closer to the priapulids becomes most probable. This said, their pharynx has the sixfold symmetry that likely characterised the ancestral ecdysozoan, rather than the fivefold symmetry of priapulans. A nematomorph affinity appears to be an artefact that results from under-sampling of the priapulid stem group. Their relationship with Archaeopriapulida is unclear, and either group may be paraphyletic to the other. Some authors choose to include paleoscolecids within Priapulida.

Martin R. Smith and Alavya Dhungana suggested in a 2022 publication that palaeoscolecids are a grade including sister taxa to Panarthropoda, highlighting similarities between the dorsal plates of taxa such as cricocosmiids and those of lobopodians such as Microdictyon. This proposal was made in response to a 2021 paper that found in a phylogenetic analysis that paleoscolecids were stem-group priapulids.

== Taxonomy ==
As palaeoscolecids may represent a grade rather than a clade, drawing up a formal taxonomy proves problematic. What is more, two parallel taxonomies exist: a form taxonomy for sclerites, and a true taxonomy for articulated fossils. The most recent holistic study of priapulids by Harvey et al. (2010) defines a core of palaeoscolecids characterized by a cuticle that is made up of interlocking plates of multiple sizes, and a looser assemblage (palaeoscolecids sensu lato) including other unconfirmed and palaeoscolecid-like forms:

=== Palaeoscolecids sensu stricto ===
==== Articulated macrofossils ====
- Palaeoscolex piscatorum (early Ordovician)
- Palaeoscolex (=Mafangscolex) sinensis (early Cambrian, China)
- Sanxiascolex papillogyrus (early Cambrian, China)
- Scathascolex minor (Burgess Shale, mid-Cambrian)
- Arrakiscolex aasei (Drumian, Cambrian; Marjum Formation, Utah)
- Sahascolex (early Cambrian of Siberia)
- Gamascolex (early Ordovician, Czech Rep.)
- Plasmuscolex (early Ordovician, Czech Rep.)
- ?Guanduscolex minor (early Cambrian, China)
- ? Family Chalazoscolecidae:
  - ?Chalazoscolex (Sirius Passet; fine structure unclear)
  - ?Xystoscolex (Sirius Passet; fine structure unclear)
- Wronascolex? johanssoni (mid-Cambrian, Scandinavia)
- Maotianshania? sp. (late early Cambrian, Scandinavia)
- Radnorscolex (2 species, Ordovician-Silurian, Great Britain)

==== Articulated microfossils ====
(from Orsten-type deposits, preserved in three dimensions)

===== Palaeoscolecidae From Australia =====
- Austroscolex Muller & Hinz 1993
- Corallioscolex Muller & Hinz 1993
- Euryscolex Muller & Hinz 1993*
- Hadimopanella Gedik 1977
- Kaloskolex Muller & Hinz 1993
- Milaculum Muller 1973
- Murrayscolex Muller & Hinz 1993
- Pantoioscolex Muller & Hinz 1993
- Rhomboscolex Muller & Hinz 1993
- Schistoscolex Muller & Hinz 1993
- Shergoldiscolex Muller & Hinz 1993
- Thoracoscolex Muller & Hinz 1993

===== From China =====
- Dispinoscolex
- Houscolex Zhang & Pratt (Order and Family uncertain)
- Hunanoscolex Duan & Dong (= Ornatoscolex Duan & Dong)

=== Palaeoscolecids sensu lato ===
Other long and narrow Palaeozoic worms that exhibit an invariant body width are commonly referred to the palaeoscolecids, even though they lack the cuticular structure that defines the group; this 'Palaeoscolecid sensu lato' group includes Louisella, Cricocosmia, Tabelliscolex, Tylotites and others. Maotianshania and, by extension, the family Maotianshaniidae, was excluded from the "Palaeoscolecids sensu stricto" by Harvey et al. (2010), but it has been argued that members of this family do exhibit the requisite cuticular structure, if discreetly.

=== Status impossible to determine from current material ===
It is possible that Markuelia represents an embryonic palaeoscolecid.

=== Linnean taxonomy ===
Order Uncertain

- Family Chalazoscolecidae Conway Morris & Peel 2010
  Defined by the presence of smooth, folded and sclerite-bearing cuticular regions
  - Chalazoscolex pharkus
  - Xystoscolex boreogyrus

Order Cricocosmida Han et al. 2007
Defined by the presence of an unarmoured neck between the proboscis and the trunk, and a single pair of posterior hooks.
- Family Cricocosmiidae
  - Tabelliscolex:
    - Tabelliscolex hexagonus
    - Tabelliscolex maanshanensis
    - Tabelliscolex chengjiangensis
  - Cricocosmia:
    - Cricocosmia jinningensis
  - Houscolex
- Family Maotianshaniidae
  - Maotianshania cylindrica Sun and Huo, 1987
- Family Palaeoscolecidae
  - Wronascolex
    Defined by presence of Hadimopanella sclerites with three to ten nodes.
  - Palaeoscolex
    Defined by presence of Milaculum-type plates, i.e. rectangular with parallel rows of nodes
  - Utahscolex Whitaker et al. 2020
  - Ashetscolex Muir et al 2014
  - Sanduscolex Muir et al 2014
- Family Tylotitidae
  - Tylotites petiolaris Luo and Hu, 1999
Other Palaeoscolecidae or unassigned

- Gamascolex Kraft & Mergl, 1989
- Guanduscolex minor Hu et al., 2008
- Louisella pedunculata
- Avannaascolex apalos
- Palaeoscolex sinensis Hou & Sun 1988 (=Mafangscolex siniensis, Parapalaeoscolex sinensis)
- Paramaotianshania zijunia Hu et al 2012
- Wudingscolex sapushanensis Hu et al 2012

Microfossil material

- Floraconformis Goñi et al. 2023
- Hadimopanella
- Kaimenella
- Milaculum
- Plasmuscolex Kraft & Mergl, 1989
- Protoscolex
- Sahascolex Ivantsov & Wrona, 2004
- Utahphospha
- Yunnanoscolex magnus Hu et al 2012

=== Genus level taxonomy ===
==== Palaeoscolex ====
Palaeoscolex has been abused as a wastebasket taxon for palaeoscolecid macrofossils. The most recent proposal is that Palaeoscolex should only include taxa with Milaculum-type sclerites, as in the type species P. piscatorum. As such, P. ratcliffei and P. huainanensis should not be included in Palaeoscolex.

==== Wronascolex ====
Originally described from Siberia, Wronascolex should now be considered to include all taxa with Hadimopanella sclerites that have 3–10 nodes in a single circle, perhaps including Yunnanoscolex.

==== Guanduscolex, Wudingscolex ====
Though these genera have sclerites that resemble Hadimopanella knappologicum, they remain valid genera.

==== Mafangscolex ====
This genus has simple sclerites with a single (small but prominent) node in the middle, so can be separated from Palaeoscolex(unless this simplicity is taphonomic). Its introvert has a six-fold symmetry, whereas its proboscis has quincuncially arranged teeth that resemble those of other Cambrian ecdysozoan worms.

==== Utahscolex ====
Originally described from the Spence Shale of Utah, Utahscolex has four transverse rings of plates per annulus, arranged as two 'bands' of double rows of plates separated by a central naked zone. Occasionally, single row bifurcates into two rows (for up to 6 rows per annulus). The plates are circular, and unornamented. Platelets and microplates are absent.
