= Strictocorniculum =

Strictocorniculum Temporal range: Cambrian Stage 3–Cambrian Stage 4

Scientific classification
- Kingdom: Animalia
- Clade: Panarthropoda
- Phylum: †Lobopodia
- Family: †Hallucigeniidae
- Genus: †Strictocorniculum
- Species: †S. vanallerum

Binomial name
- †Strictocorniculum vanallerum Landing, 1995

Extinct genus of shelled animals

Strictocorniculum is an extinct genus of animals known from small coniform sclerites. The only known species is S. vanallerum. Fossils of this genus have been found in Early Cambrian strata of Massachusetts, New Brunswick, Nova Scotia and Newfoundland. It is currently interpreted as a lobopodian.

== Discovery and naming ==
In 1988, Landing described small, slander shelly fossil elements that he attributed to the genus Rhombocorniculum which was thought to be a pseudoconodont. He believed that this form represented a new species of Rhombocorniculum. In 1995, he named a new species and genus for those elements: Strictocorniculum vanallerum. He also created the new family Strictocorniculidae and the superfamily Strictocorniculacea. Fossils belonging to this species have been discovered in the Brigus Formation (Nova Scotia) and the upper part of the Weymouth Formation (Massachusetts), that both correspond to the Callavia broeggeri trilobite Biozone. This Zone belongs to the regional Branchian Series (late Cambrian Stage 3 to early Cambrian Stage 4). Landing et al. also documented the presence of S. vanallerum in the BHr-II-1.6 and BHr-II-2.3 sections (Beaver Harbour, New Brunswick) of the Wade's Lane Formation which also belong to the Branchian Series. Landing also stated that S. vanallerum occurred in Newfoundland.

The genus name Strictocorniculum means "straight little horn". The specific name honors Linda Van Aller Hernick, who contributed to Cambrian-Devonian paleontology research.

== Description and affinities ==
The sclerites of S. vanallerum reach 8 mm in length. They are nearly straight and have an almost circular cross-section. The surface of the sclerites is sculptured in a rhomboid pattern. They were first interpreted as pseudoconodont elements. Pseudoconodontida is an order that was created to designate coniform tooth-like elements of uncertain affinities. They differ from other conodont-like groups, such as protoconondonts, euconodonts and paraconodonts in their histological structure.

In 2013, Caron et al. suggested that several conodont-like taxa could actually represent hallucigenid lobopodian spines. They especially proposed a link between Rhombocorniculum, a close relative of Strictocorniculum, and Hallucigenia. In 2025, Knecht et al. published the following cladogram of lobopodians, in which both Rhombocorniculum and Strictocorniculum were recovered as Hallucigenia-like genera.

Cladrogram after Knecht et al.

- - †Diania
  - - †Lenisambulatrix
    - - - †Paucipodia
        - - †Thanahita
          - - †Eoconchariidae
              - †Microdictyon
              - †Fusuchoncharium
              - †Quadratapora
            - - - †Xenusion
                - †Onychodictyon
              - - †Strictocorniculum
                - †Rhombocorniculum
                - †Orstenotubulus
                - †Carbotubulus
                - †Hallucigenia fortis
                - †Hallucigenia sparsa
                - - †"Hallucigenia" hongmeia
                  - - †Cardiodictyon
                    - - Tardigrada (tardigrades)
                      - †Luolishaniida
                        - - †Ovatiovermis
                          - †Facivermis
                        - - †Luolishania
                          - †Collinsovermidae
                            - †EBS Collinsovermid (SAM P14848)
                            - - †Acinocricus
                              - - †Collinsovermis
                                - - †Collinsium
                                  - †Entothyreos
      - ⊞
        ⊟
        - †Aysheaiidae
          - †Aysheaia
          - - Soom Shale lobopodian (C1947)
            - - †Hadranax
              - †Palaeocampa
        - Antennopoda
          - - †Antennacanthopodia
            - Onychophora (velvet worms)
              - †Antennipatus
              - †Cretoperipatus
              - †Helenodora
              - Living onychophorans
          - - †Siberiidae
              - †Siberion
              - †Megadictyon
              - †Jianshanopodia
            - - - †Pambdelurion
                - †Kerygmachelidae
              - - †Opabiniidae
                - - †Radiodonta (e.g. Anomalocaris)
                  - Deuteropoda (modern arthropods)
