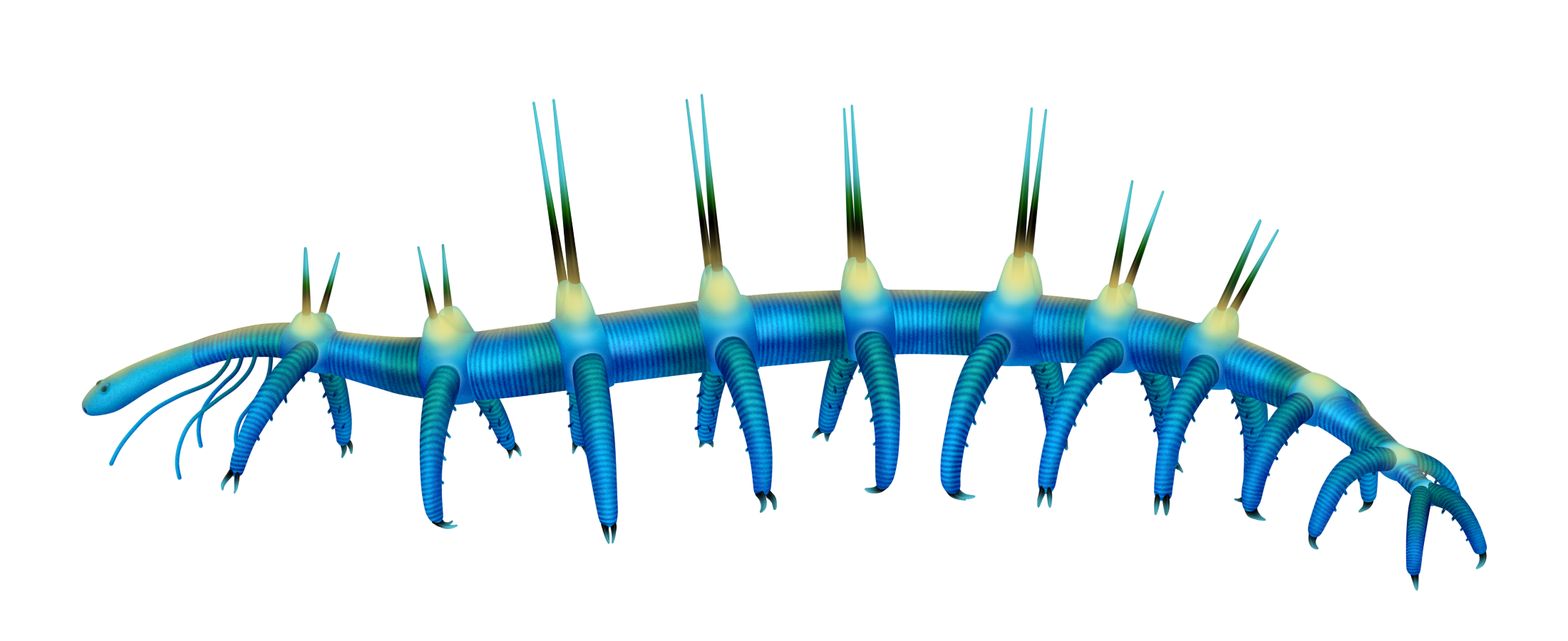
- Reconstruction of Orstenotubulus

Scientific classification
- Kingdom: Animalia
- Clade: Panarthropoda
- Phylum: †Lobopodia
- Genus: †Orstenotubulus
- Species: †O. evamuellerae

Binomial name
- †Orstenotubulus evamuellerae Maas et al 2007

= Orstenotubulus =

Orstenotubulus Temporal range: Furongian

Extinct genus of Cambrian animals

Orstenotubulus is a genus of minute lobopodian known from three-dimensionally preserved remains found in the Upper Cambrian (Furongian) Orsten deposits of southern Sweden.

== Morphology ==
Orstenotubulus was tiny, estimated to only be 4–5 millimetres (5/32–3/16 in) long, with elongated, thin body about 0.12–0.205 millimetres (1/200–1/125 in) wide with pairs of upward-pointing spines running down the entire top of the body. Each pair of spines was associated with a pair of relatively elongate legs, with the whole body suggested to have 9-10 spine-leg pairs. The body was weakly annulated. It had tiny retractable spines ventral to the leg surface.

== Ecology ==
Orstenotubulus is thought to have lived by walking on the seafloor, with its spines likely serving to protect it against predators.

== Taxonomy ==
A 2015 study found that it was within the "hallucishaniid" grouping of lobopodians, related to lobopodians like the also spined Hallucigenia and Collinsovermis.

Phylogeny of Panarthropoda and lobopodians after Knecht et al. 2025:

- - †Diania
  - - †Lenisambulatrix
    - - - †Paucipodia
        - - †Thanahita
          - - †Eoconchariidae
              - †Microdictyon
              - †Fusuchoncharium
              - †Quadratapora
            - - - †Xenusion
                - †Onychodictyon
              - - †Strictocorniculum
                - †Rhombocorniculum
                - †Orstenotubulus
                - †Carbotubulus
                - †Hallucigenia fortis
                - †Hallucigenia sparsa
                - - †"Hallucigenia" hongmeia
                  - - †Cardiodictyon
                    - - Tardigrada (tardigrades)
                      - †Luolishaniida
                        - - †Ovatiovermis
                          - †Facivermis
                        - - †Luolishania
                          - †Collinsovermidae
                            - †EBS Collinsovermid (SAM P14848)
                            - - †Acinocricus
                              - - †Collinsovermis
                                - - †Collinsium
                                  - †Entothyreos
      - - †Aysheaiidae
          - †Aysheaia
          - - Soom Shale lobopodian (C1947)
            - - †Hadranax
              - †Palaeocampa
        - Antennopoda
          - - †Antennacanthopodia
            - Onychophora (velvet worms)
              - †Antennipatus
              - †Cretoperipatus
              - †Helenodora
              - Living onychophorans
          - - †Siberiidae
              - †Siberion
              - †Megadictyon
              - †Jianshanopodia
            - - - †Pambdelurion
                - †Kerygmachelidae
              - - †Opabiniidae
                - - †Radiodonta (e.g. Anomalocaris)
                  - Deuteropoda (modern arthropods)
