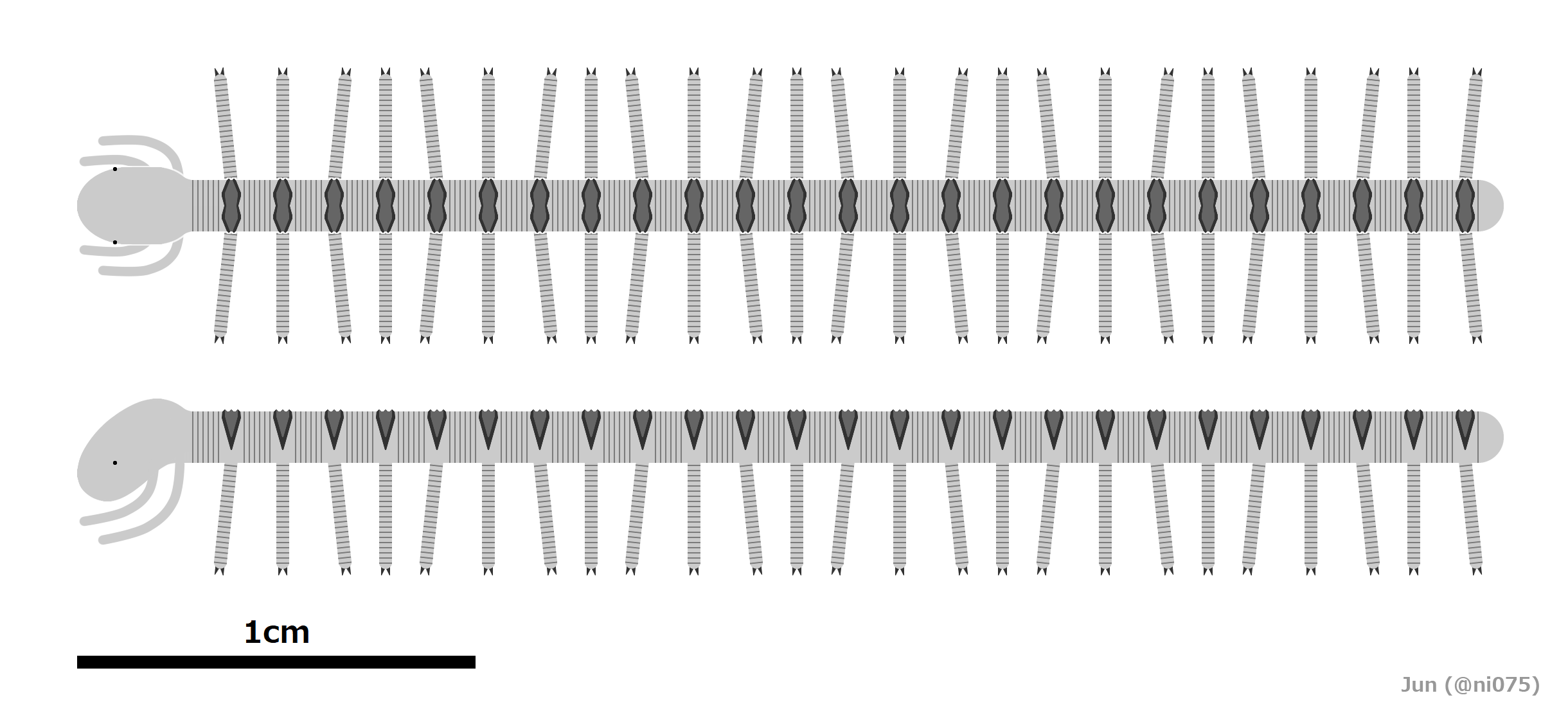

Scientific classification
- Kingdom: Animalia
- Clade: Panarthropoda
- Phylum: †Lobopodia
- Class: †Xenusia
- Order: †Archonychophora
- Family: †Cardiodictyidae; Hou & Bergström, 1995
- Genus: †Cardiodictyon; Hou, Ramsköld & Bergström, 1991

Type species
- Cardiodictyon catenulum Hou, Ramsköld & Bergström, 1991

= Cardiodictyon =

Cardiodictyon Temporal range: Early Cambrian 525–518 Ma

Extinct genus of lobopodians

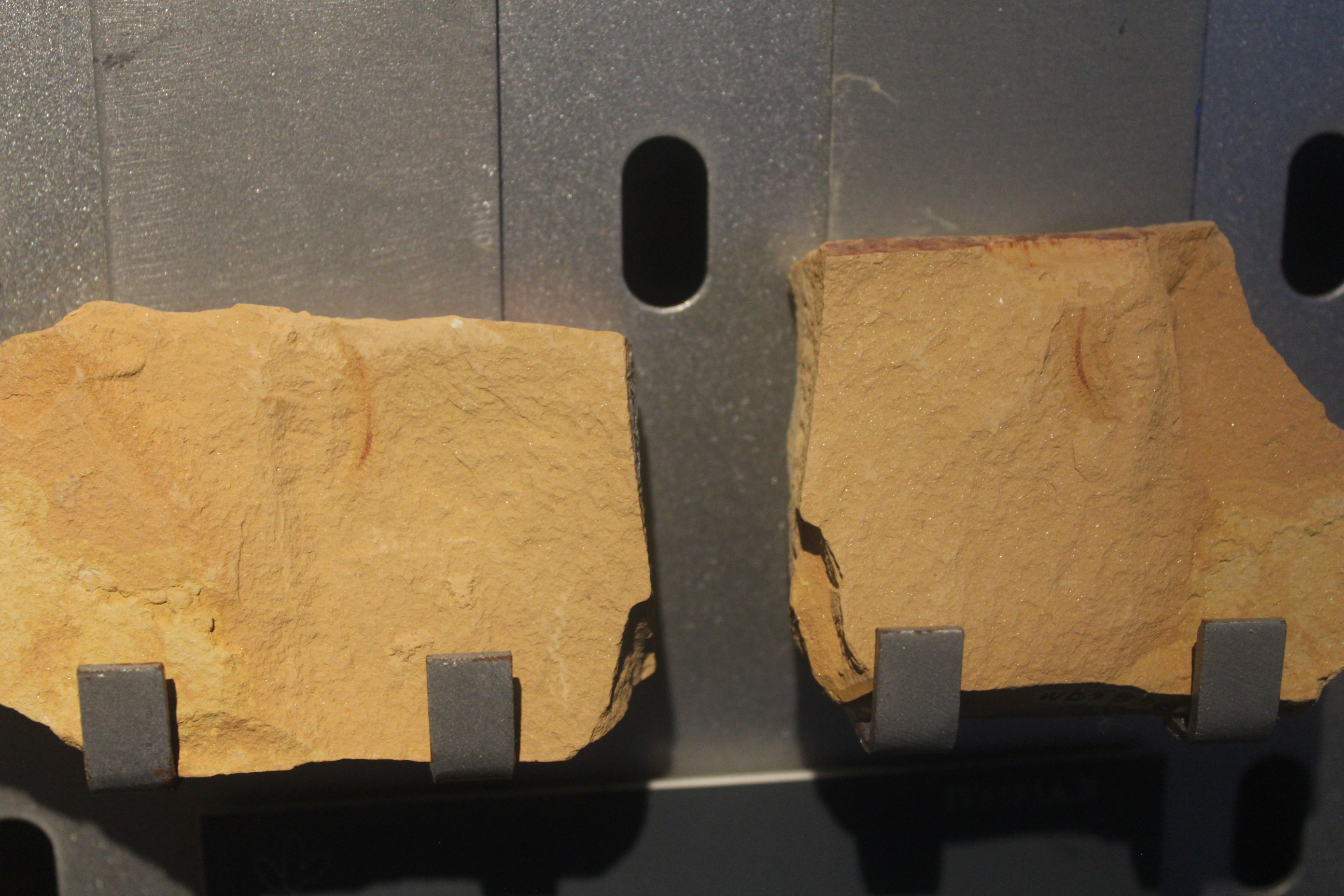
Fossil specimen, Geological Museum of China

Cardiodictyon is a genus of lobopodian known from 518 millions years old Chengjiang Lagerstätte. 525 millions years old partial fossil is also reported.

== Description ==
It has ~25 pairs of legs, each associated with a pair of dorsal plates. Each leg terminates in a pair of claws. It may or may not have a head shield, though it certainly has an expanded head.

In 2022, a 518,000,000 years old specimen of C. catenulum was researched and shown an unsegmented head and a brain composed of three separate cephalic parts. However, although "three parts" in this study means prosocerebrum, protocerebrum and deutocerebrum, it is different from earlier studies that referred protocerebrum, deutocerebrum and tritocerebrum as tripartite brain of arthropod, and treated prosocerebrum as part of protocerebrum.

== Classification ==
The slightly simplified cladogram below is from a paper by Knecht et al. redescribing the lobopodian Palaeocampa anthrax.

- - †Diania
  - - †Lenisambulatrix
    - - - †Paucipodia
        - - †Thanahita
          - - †Eoconchariidae
              - †Microdictyon
              - †Fusuchoncharium
              - †Quadratapora
            - - - †Xenusion
                - †Onychodictyon
              - - †Strictocorniculum
                - †Rhombocorniculum
                - †Orstenotubulus
                - †Carbotubulus
                - †Hallucigenia fortis
                - †Hallucigenia sparsa
                - - †"Hallucigenia" hongmeia
                  - - †Cardiodictyon
                    - - Tardigrada (tardigrades)
                      - †Luolishaniida
                        - - †Ovatiovermis
                          - †Facivermis
                        - - †Luolishania
                          - †Collinsovermidae
                            - †EBS Collinsovermid (SAM P14848)
                            - - †Acinocricus
                              - - †Collinsovermis
                                - - †Collinsium
                                  - †Entothyreos
      - - †Aysheaiidae
          - †Aysheaia
          - - Soom Shale lobopodian (C1947)
            - - †Hadranax
              - †Palaeocampa
        - Antennopoda
          - - †Antennacanthopodia
            - Onychophora (velvet worms)
              - †Antennipatus
              - †Cretoperipatus
              - †Helenodora
              - Living onychophorans
          - - †Siberiidae
              - †Siberion
              - †Megadictyon
              - †Jianshanopodia
            - - - †Pambdelurion
                - †Kerygmachelidae
              - - †Opabiniidae
                - - †Radiodonta (e.g. Anomalocaris)
                  - Deuteropoda (modern arthropods)
