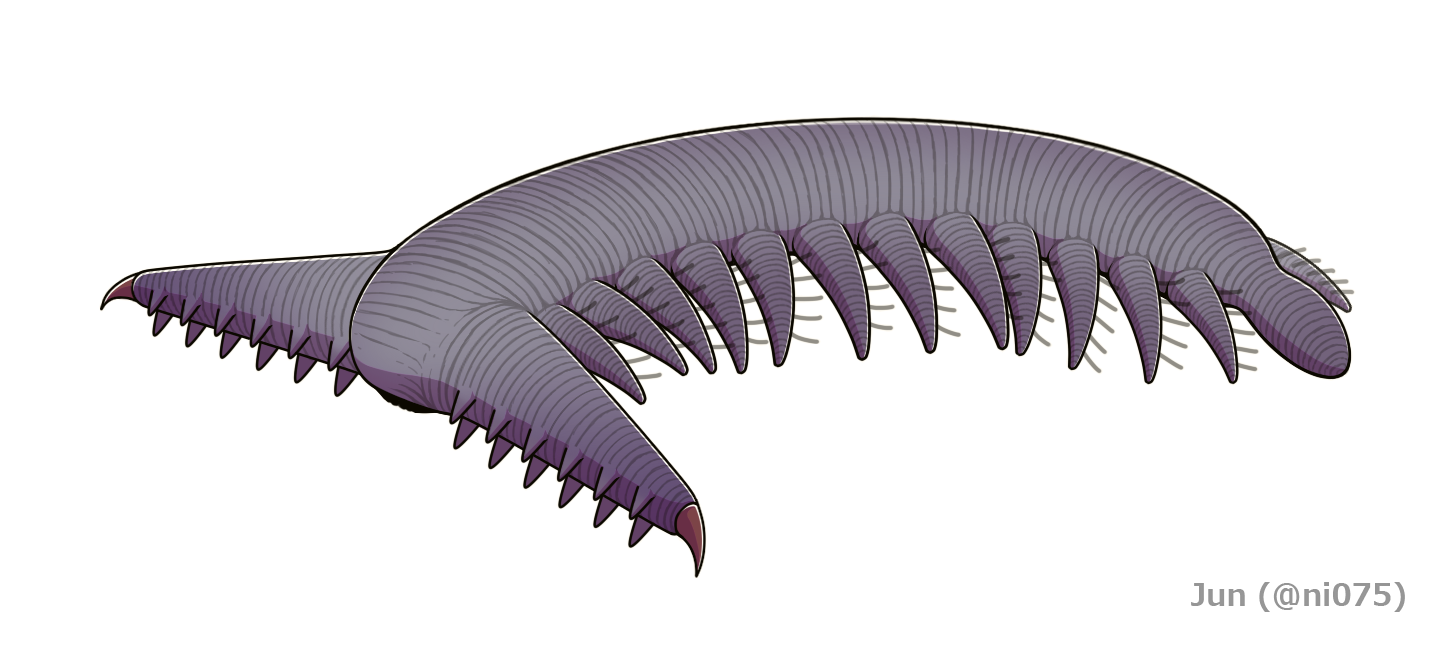
- Reconstruction of Siberion lenaicus

Scientific classification
- Kingdom: Animalia
- Clade: Panarthropoda
- Phylum: †Lobopodia
- Class: †Xenusia
- Order: †Siberiida
- Family: †Siberiidae
- Genus: †Siberion; Dzik, 2011
- Species: †S. lenaicus

Binomial name
- †Siberion lenaicus Dzik, 2011

= Siberion =

Siberion Temporal range: Early Cambrian 518–513 Ma

Extinct genus of lobopodian

Siberion is an extinct genus of lobopodian from the Sinsk biota of Russia. Its anatomy, including the proboscis-like organ projecting from the face and prominent grasping first pair of appendages, suggests that xenusians like this organism may have been phylogenetically related to anomalocaridids, like Anomalocaris. Only two incomplete specimens are known, and the probability of finding more is low, as the Sinsk Algal Lens has been nearly destroyed by commercial fossil collectors.

== Morphology ==
It is similar to other siberiids, however it is distinguished by the shape of its “tail” and body. The holotype preserves most of the body, however the appendages and head are incomplete. Its body is annulated, and while the head preserves large appendages and a radial mouth further details are unclear. Siberion has at least 12 pairs of legs which may have gill branches like other siberiids, however as mentioned previously they are incomplete. At the posterior end there is a bulbous structure, which is likely an extension of the body due to similar muscle impressions. The only internal structure seen is the digestive tract which resembles that of dinocaridids, however it is unclear whether gut diverticulae are present.

== Phylogeny ==
Phylogeny of Panarthropoda after Knecht et al. 2025:

- †Diania
- - †Lenisambulatrix
  - - - †Paucipodia
      - - †Thanahita
        - - †Eoconchariidae
            - †Microdictyon
            - †Fusuchoncharium
            - †Quadratapora
          - - - †Xenusion
              - †Onychodictyon
            - - †Strictocorniculum
              - †Rhombocorniculum
              - †Orstenotubulus
              - †Carbotubulus
              - †Hallucigenia fortis
              - †Hallucigenia sparsa
              - - †Hallucigenia hongmeia
                - - †Cardiodictyon
                  - - Tardigrada
                    - †Luolishaniida
                      - - †Ovatiovermis
                        - †Facivermis
                      - - †Luolishania
                        - †Collinsovermidae
                          - †Acincocricus
                          - - †Collinsovermis
                            - - †Collinsium
                              - †Entothyreos
    - - †Aysheaiidae
        - †Aysheaia
        - - †Hadranax
          - †Palaeocampa
      - Antennopoda
        - - †Antennacanthopodia
          - Onychophora (velvet worms)
        - - †Siberiidae
            - †Siberion
            - †Megadictyon
            - †Jianshanopodia
          - - - †Pambdelurion
              - †Kerygmachelidae
            - - †Opabiniidae
              - - †Radiodonta (e.g. Anomalocaris)
                - Deuteropoda (modern arthropods)
