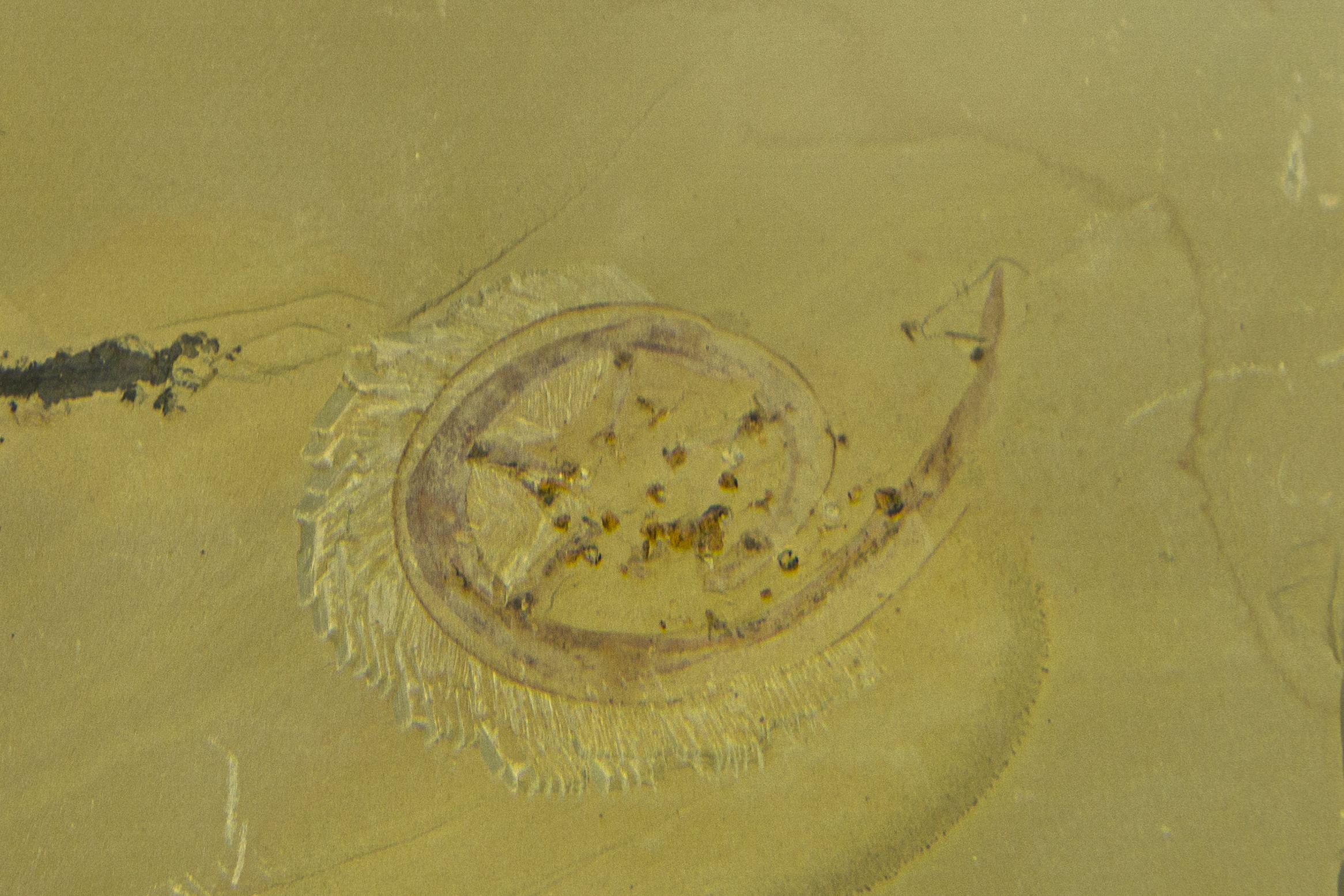
- Fossil of Paucipodia haikouensis
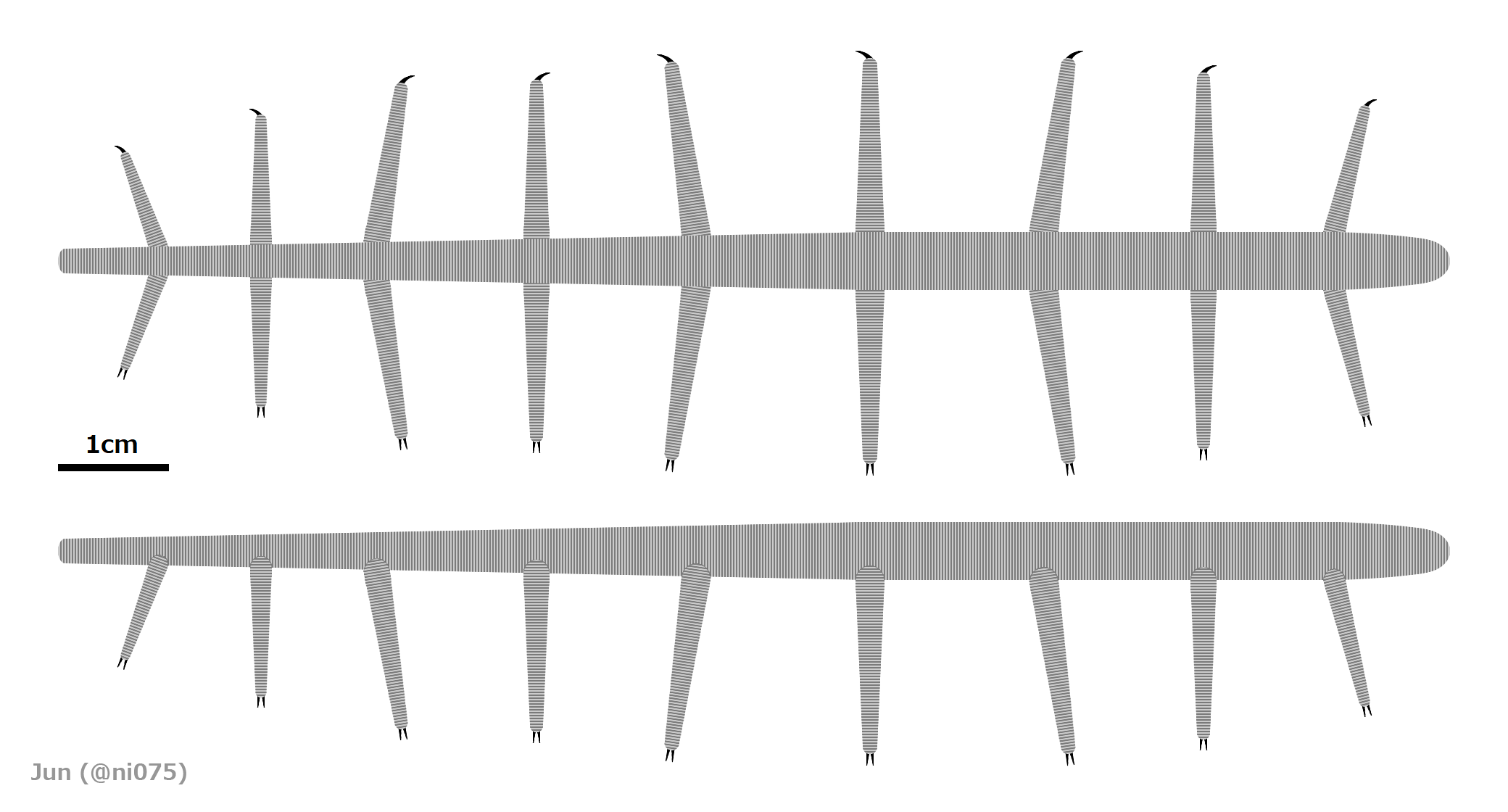
- Diagrammatic reconstruction

Scientific classification
- Kingdom: Animalia
- Clade: Panarthropoda
- Phylum: †Lobopodia
- Class: †Xenusia
- Order: †Archonychophora
- Family: †Paucipodiidae; Hou et al., 2004
- Genus: †Paucipodia; Chen, Zhou & Ramsköld, 1995
- Species: †P. inermis

Binomial name
- †Paucipodia inermis Chen, Zhou & Ramsköld, 1995

= Paucipodia =

Paucipodia inermis Temporal range: Cambrian Stage 3

Extinct genus of panarthropods

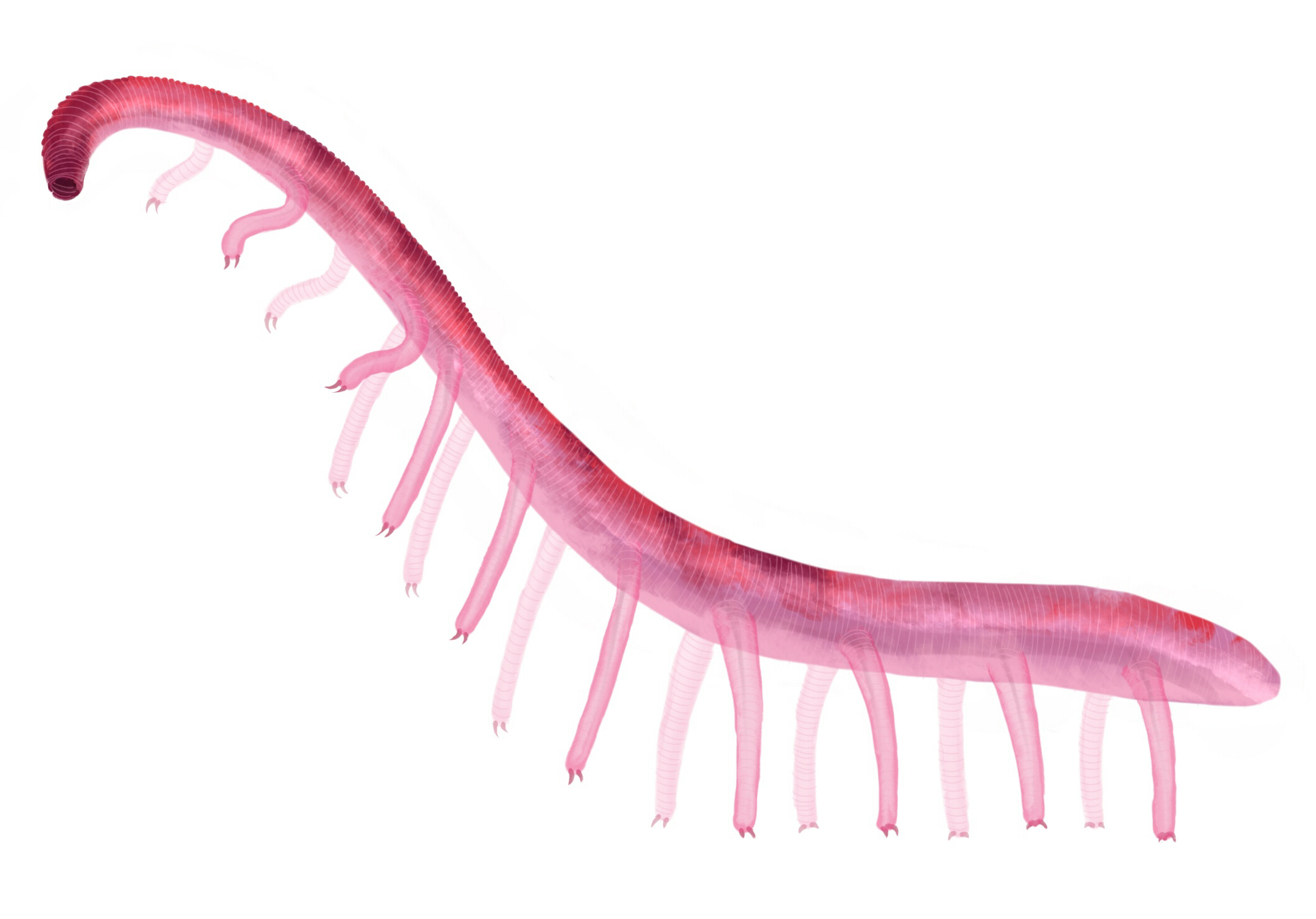
Life restoration

Paucipodia inermis is a lobopodian known from the Lower Cambrian Chengjiang lagerstätte.

== Description ==
=== Gut ===
Paucipodia’s gut is puzzling; in some places, it is preserved in three dimensions, infilled with sediment; whereas in others it may be flat. These cannot result from phosphatisation, which is usually responsible for three-dimensional gut preservation, for the phosphate content of the guts is under 1% – the contents comprise quartz and muscovite. Its fossils do not suggest it had any sclerites, especially when compared with the related Hallucigenia.

== Classification ==
In a 2016 study redescribing Helenodora, Paucipodia was found to be its closest relative.

The slightly simplified cladogram below is from a 2025 paper by Knecht et al. redescribing the lobopodian Palaeocampa anthrax. In it, Paucipodia was found to be a basal lobopodian

- - †Diania
  - - †Lenisambulatrix
    - - - †Paucipodia
        - - †Thanahita
          - - †Eoconchariidae
              - †Microdictyon
              - †Fusuchoncharium
              - †Quadratapora
            - - - †Xenusion
                - †Onychodictyon
              - - †Strictocorniculum
                - †Rhombocorniculum
                - †Orstenotubulus
                - †Carbotubulus
                - †Hallucigenia fortis
                - †Hallucigenia sparsa
                - - †"Hallucigenia" hongmeia
                  - - †Cardiodictyon
                    - - Tardigrada (tardigrades)
                      - †Luolishaniida
                        - - †Ovatiovermis
                          - †Facivermis
                        - - †Luolishania
                          - †Collinsovermidae
                            - †EBS Collinsovermid (SAM P14848)
                            - - †Acinocricus
                              - - †Collinsovermis
                                - - †Collinsium
                                  - †Entothyreos
      - - †Aysheaiidae
          - †Aysheaia
          - - Soom Shale lobopodian (C1947)
            - - †Hadranax
              - †Palaeocampa
        - Antennopoda
          - - †Antennacanthopodia
            - Onychophora (velvet worms)
              - †Antennipatus
              - †Cretoperipatus
              - †Helenodora
              - Living onychophorans
          - - †Siberiidae
              - †Siberion
              - †Megadictyon
              - †Jianshanopodia
            - - - †Pambdelurion
                - †Kerygmachelidae
              - - †Opabiniidae
                - - †Radiodonta (e.g. Anomalocaris)
                  - Deuteropoda (modern arthropods)

== See also ==
- Lobopod guts
