= Rhombocorniculum =

Rhombocorniculum Temporal range: Cambrian Stage 2–Cambrian Stage 3

Scientific classification
- Kingdom: Animalia
- Clade: Panarthropoda
- Phylum: †Lobopodia
- Family: †Hallucigeniidae
- Genus: †Rhombocorniculum; Walliser, 1958

Extinct genus of shelled animals

Rhombocorniculum is a species of small shelly fossil comprising twisted ornamented cones. It has been described from the Comley Limestone and elsewhere. R. cancellatum straddles the Atdabanian/Botomian boundary. The structure of its inner layer suggests that its phosphatic fibres formed within a flexible organic matrix.

== Description ==
Three species are recognized — in stratigraphic succession: R. insolutum, R. cancellatum (=R. walliseri), and R. spinosus (=Rushtonites spinosus). Landing (1995) refers R. insolutum to the strictocorniculids, along with Rushtonites. Hinz (1987) considers insolutum to fall within the variability seen in cancellatum.

== Classification ==
Based on details of the ornament and construction, Rhombocorniculum is interpreted as the spines of a Hallucigenia-like lobopodian worm.

The slightly simplified cladogram below is from a paper by Knecht et al. redescribing the lobopodian Palaeocampa anthrax.

- - †Diania
  - - †Lenisambulatrix
    - - - †Paucipodia
        - - †Thanahita
          - - †Eoconchariidae
              - †Microdictyon
              - †Fusuchoncharium
              - †Quadratapora
            - - - †Xenusion
                - †Onychodictyon
              - - †Strictocorniculum
                - †Rhombocorniculum
                - †Orstenotubulus
                - †Carbotubulus
                - †Hallucigenia fortis
                - †Hallucigenia sparsa
                - - †"Hallucigenia" hongmeia
                  - - †Cardiodictyon
                    - - Tardigrada (tardigrades)
                      - †Luolishaniida
                        - - †Ovatiovermis
                          - †Facivermis
                        - - †Luolishania
                          - †Collinsovermidae
                            - †EBS Collinsovermid (SAM P14848)
                            - - †Acinocricus
                              - - †Collinsovermis
                                - - †Collinsium
                                  - †Entothyreos
      - - †Aysheaiidae
          - †Aysheaia
          - - Soom Shale lobopodian (C1947)
            - - †Hadranax
              - †Palaeocampa
        - Antennopoda
          - - †Antennacanthopodia
            - Onychophora (velvet worms)
              - †Antennipatus
              - †Cretoperipatus
              - †Helenodora
              - Living onychophorans
          - - †Siberiidae
              - †Siberion
              - †Megadictyon
              - †Jianshanopodia
            - - - †Pambdelurion
                - †Kerygmachelidae
              - - †Opabiniidae
                - - †Radiodonta (e.g. Anomalocaris)
                  - Deuteropoda (modern arthropods)

== See also ==
- Mongolitubulus
