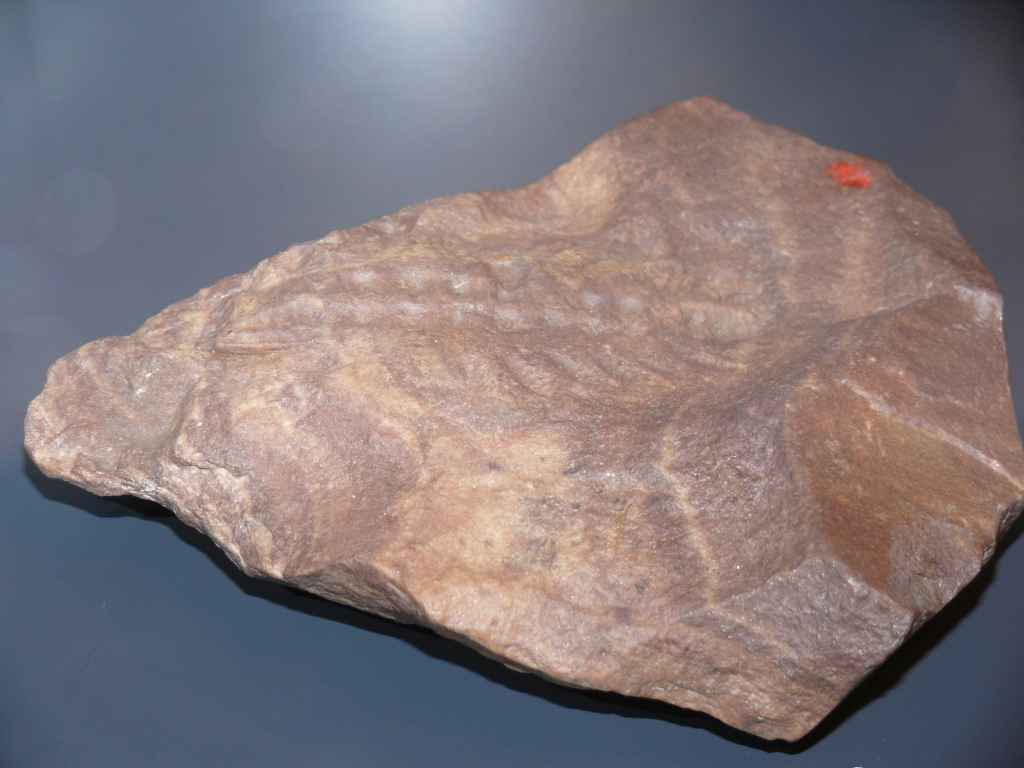
- Fossil specimen
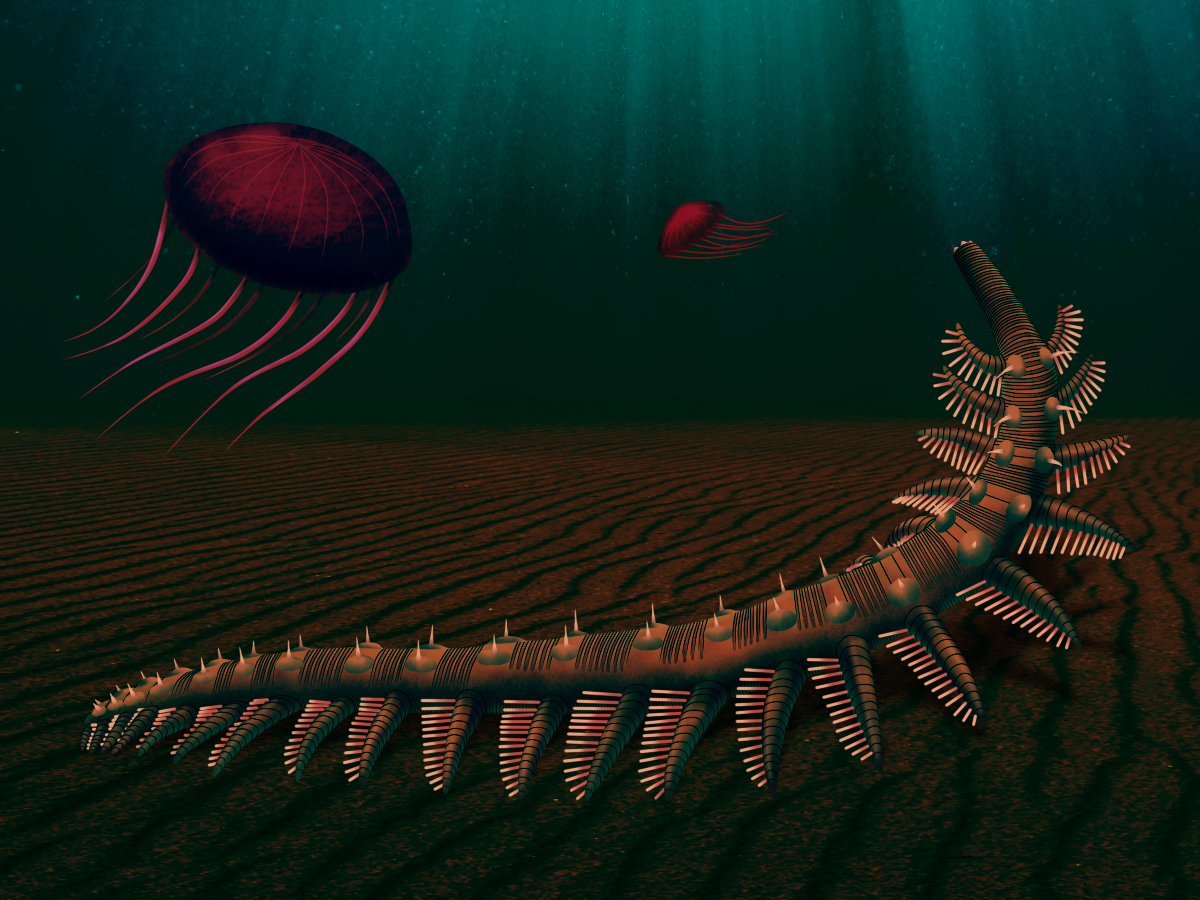
- Life restoration

Scientific classification
- Kingdom: Animalia
- Clade: Panarthropoda
- Phylum: †Lobopodia
- Class: †Xenusia
- Order: †Protonychophora
- Family: †Xenusiidae
- Genus: †Xenusion; Pompeckj, 1927
- Species: †X. auerswaldae

Binomial name
- †Xenusion auerswaldae Pompeckj, 1927

= Xenusion =

Xenusion auerswaldae Temporal range: Cambrian: Late Stage 2→Early Stage 3

Extinct genus of panarthropods

Xenusion auerswaldae is an early lobopodian known from three specimens found in glacial erratics on the Baltic coast of Germany. Another specimen, discovered shortly after the holotype, was briefly observed but soon went missing. Except for this lost specimen, the fossils probably originated in the Kalmarsund Sandstone of Southern Sweden, which was deposited in the Lower Cambrian (Upper Tommotian–Lower Atdabanian; Stages 2→3). It is the oldest currently known lobopodian with soft body fossils.

== Description ==
The specimens are not especially well preserved. The older specimen is 10 cm or so in length with a narrow, weakly segmented body. Assuming it was the posterior section, the specimen was estimated to be part of an animal about 20 cm in length. A depression runs up the bottom on all but the rearmost segments. There is a slightly bulbous termination, and each segment before that seems to have a single pair of tapering annulated legs similar to the modern onychophoran, but without specialized feet and claws. More than 10 body segments were present. There is presumably a spine on each body bump and faint transverse parallel striations on the annulations on the legs. The legs of what is possibly the foremost segments are either absent or not preserved. The head is believed to be missing or poorly preserved. Based on a new specimen that shows the anterior section, it possibly had a long narrow proboscis, but this also suggested to be a preservational artefact.

== Classification ==
While Xenusion has also been reinterpreted as an Ediacaran frond animal by Tarlo, as illustrated by McMenamin, this has not been accepted in subsequent works such as The Treatise on Invertebrate Paleontology and other publications.

The slightly simplified cladogram below is from a paper by Knecht et al. redescribing the lobopodian Palaeocampa anthrax.

- - †Diania
  - - †Lenisambulatrix
    - - - †Paucipodia
        - - †Thanahita
          - - †Eoconchariidae
              - †Microdictyon
              - †Fusuchoncharium
              - †Quadratapora
            - - - †Xenusion
                - †Onychodictyon
              - - †Strictocorniculum
                - †Rhombocorniculum
                - †Orstenotubulus
                - †Carbotubulus
                - †Hallucigenia fortis
                - †Hallucigenia sparsa
                - - †"Hallucigenia" hongmeia
                  - - †Cardiodictyon
                    - - Tardigrada (tardigrades)
                      - †Luolishaniida
                        - - †Ovatiovermis
                          - †Facivermis
                        - - †Luolishania
                          - †Collinsovermidae
                            - †EBS Collinsovermid (SAM P14848)
                            - - †Acinocricus
                              - - †Collinsovermis
                                - - †Collinsium
                                  - †Entothyreos
      - - †Aysheaiidae
          - †Aysheaia
          - - Soom Shale lobopodian (C1947)
            - - †Hadranax
              - †Palaeocampa
        - Antennopoda
          - - †Antennacanthopodia
            - Onychophora (velvet worms)
              - †Antennipatus
              - †Cretoperipatus
              - †Helenodora
              - Living onychophorans
          - - †Siberiidae
              - †Siberion
              - †Megadictyon
              - †Jianshanopodia
            - - - †Pambdelurion
                - †Kerygmachelidae
              - - †Opabiniidae
                - - †Radiodonta (e.g. Anomalocaris)
                  - Deuteropoda (modern arthropods)
