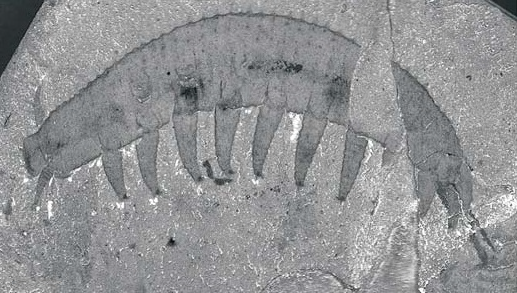
- Fossil of Aysheaia
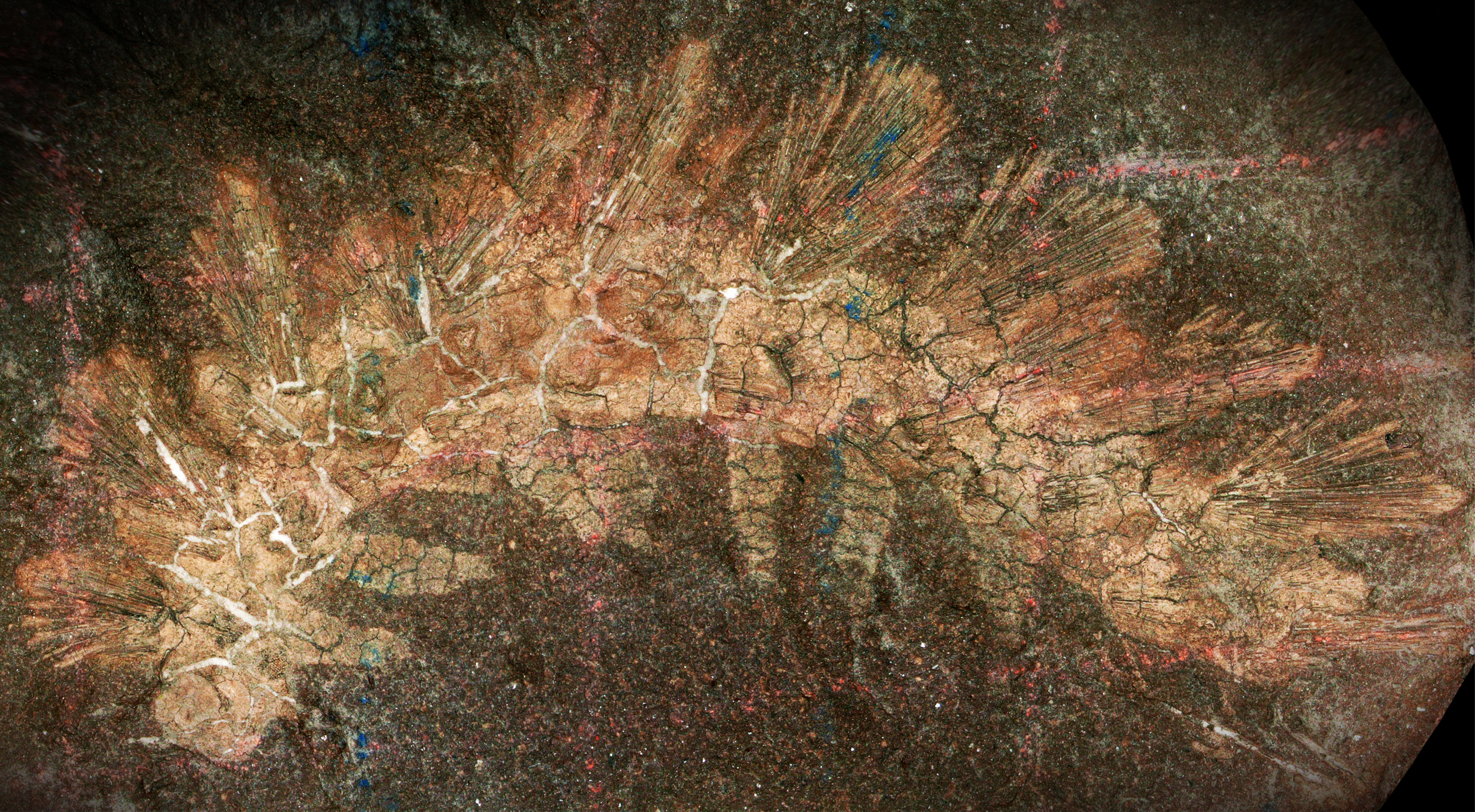
- Fossil of Palaeocampa

Scientific classification
- Kingdom: Animalia
- Clade: Panarthropoda
- Phylum: †Lobopodia
- Class: †Xenusia
- Order: †Protonychophora
- Family: †Aysheaiidae; Walcott, 1911

Type species
- Aysheaia pedunculata Walcott, 1911

Genera
- †Aysheaia; †Hadranax?; †Palaeocampa

= Aysheaiidae =

Aysheaiidae Temporal range: Wuliuan–Gzhelian

Extinct family of lobopodians

Aysheaiidae is a family of lobopodians known from the Cambrian, Ordovician, and Carboniferous. This family contains the type genus Aysheaia, the fragmentary fossil Hadranax (although this may not be a member of the family), the aberrant Palaeocampa, and an undescribed Ordovician fossil from the Soom Shale.

== Description ==
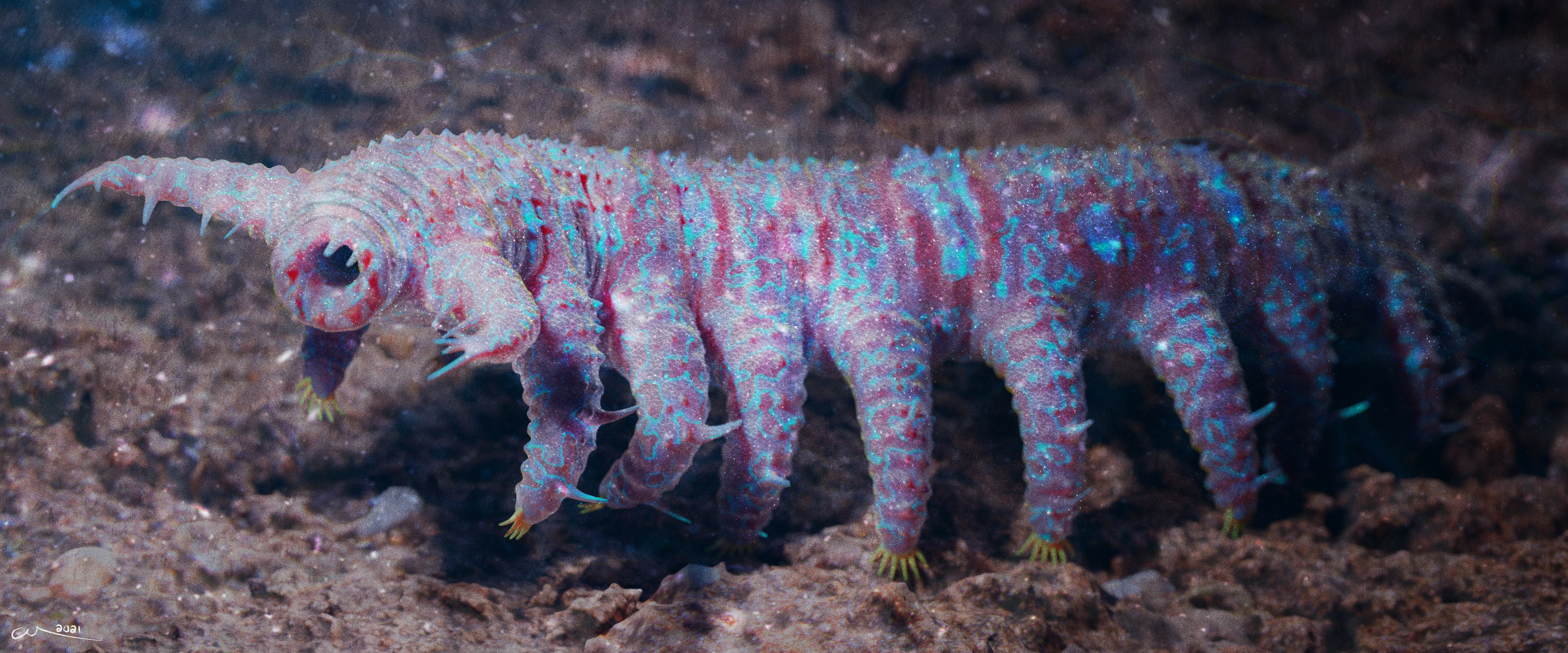
Reconstruction of Aysheaia

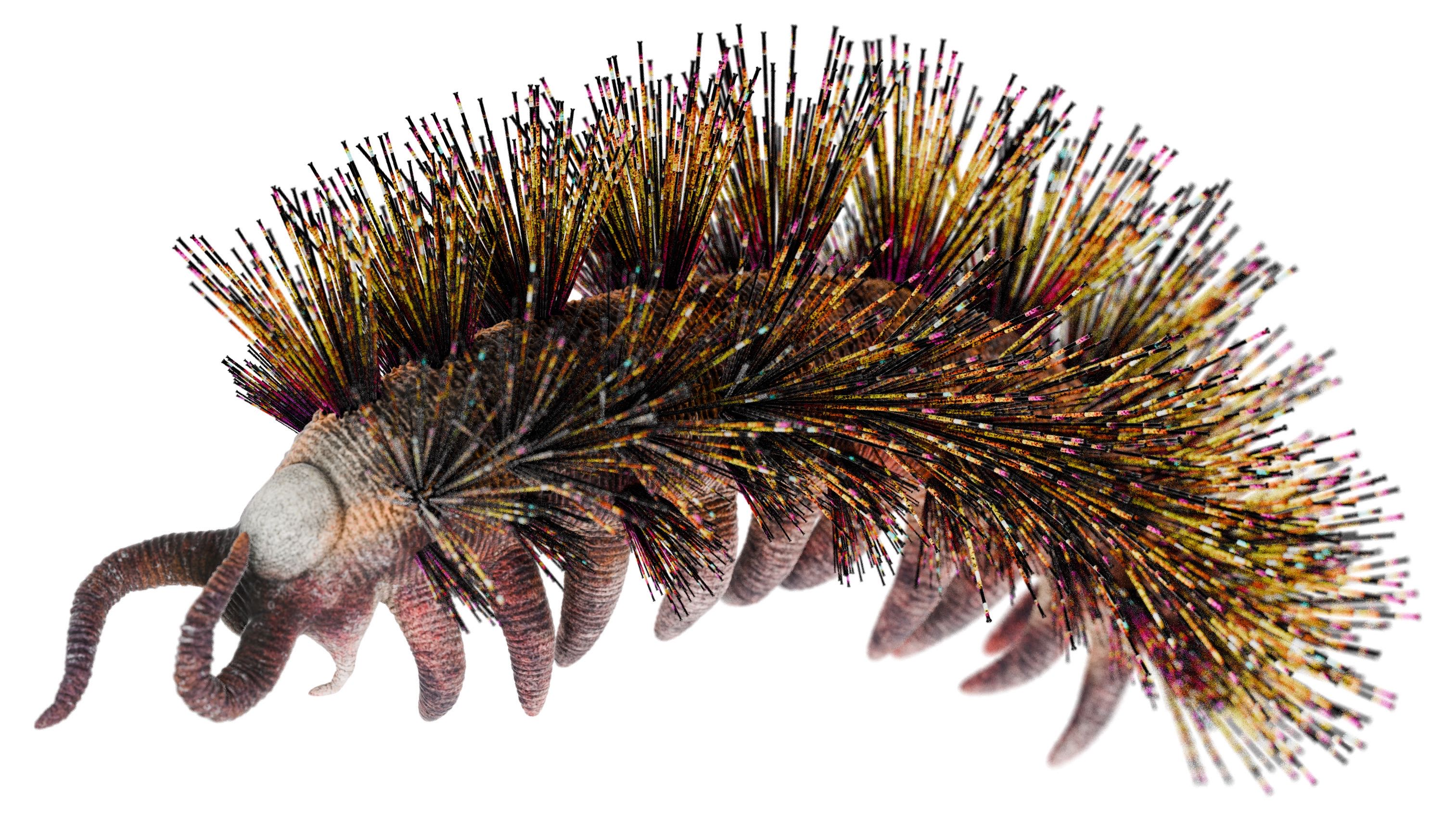
Reconstruction of Palaeocampa

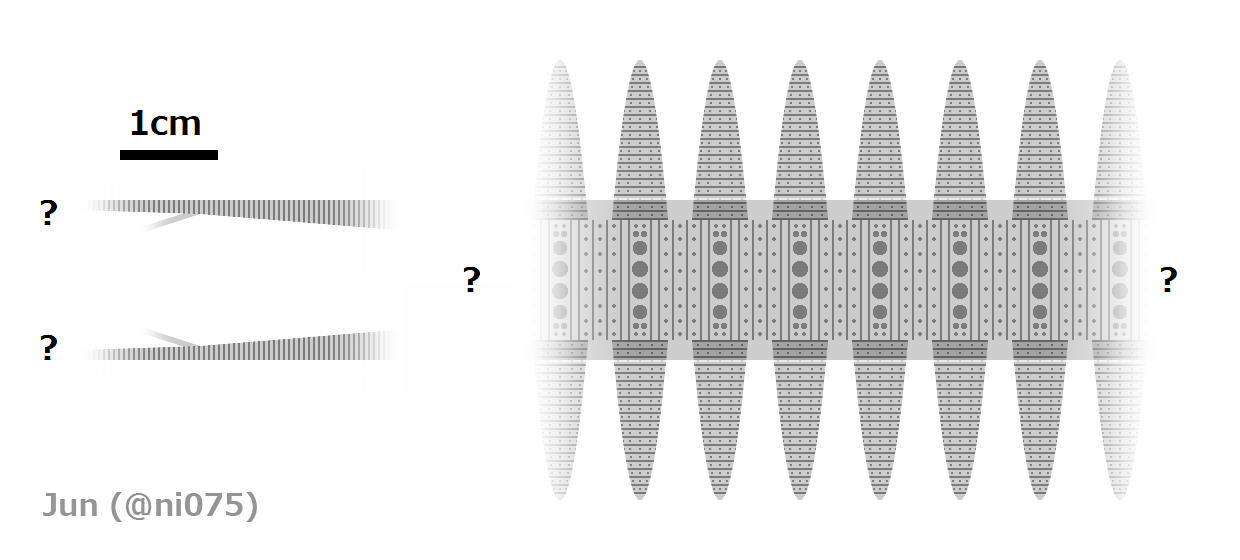
Diagrammatic reconstruction of Hadranax

This family is characterised by bearing eleven annulated limb pairs (ten pairs of walking limbs and one pair of frontal appendages), often with a large number of claws (Aysheaia has around seven) at their tips. Members of this family lack eyes or hardened appendages, bearing a simple circular mouth surrounded by papillae. The posterior portion of the body "blends into" the last leg pair, with the anus situated between the legs.

Aysheaia is the most typical member of the family, exhibiting all its defining traits. The body is relatively rough, with annulations (regular "wrinkling") and small spines protruding from it, alongside a few larger spines on its limbs. Its frontal appendages somewhat resemble those of siberiids, both being annulated and triangular in shape with a few large spines on their inward-facing side. Aside from this, it is relatively "generic", as it does not have any particularly unusual traits.

Palaeocampa is a very divergent form, as while still retaining ten walking limb pairs and a frontal appendage pair, it has a second set of much smaller frontal appendages alongside a rounded sclerite on its head, alongside its limbs being clawless. By far its most unusual trait is that it bears hundreds of spines in two sets of bundles; shorter spines on its sides and longer ones sticking upwards at a 45-degree angle. These spines bear an intricate microstructure, with septa (constrictions), longitudinal ridges, shingle-like spines along the ridges and a rook-like tip consisting of a ring of multiple spines around a spongy area. These spines are also associated with slight discolouration, which upon spectrometry analysis was found to be remnants of an aldehyde likely used as toxin, thus making this the earliest known definitively toxic animal. These spines are also firmly attached into their bundles, making them most like the spines of polychaetes (such as the fireworms it was mistaken for). It also appears to have been freshwater, as it is found in the Montceau-les-Mines lagerstätte, a montane basin at least 300 km away from the nearest ocean at the time.

It is unclear whether Hadranax belongs to Aysheaiidae, as while it has been recovered as such in various studies, it is only known from sections of the body and frontal appendages, meaning many of its characteristics are unknown. Like Palaeocampa it lacks claws on its appendages, and bears unusual clustered structures on its back (although in Hadranax these are nodes instead of spine bundles. However, its frontal appendages are likely much longer than Palaeocampa's, alongside bearing at least one endite along their length. Unusually, the grouped nodes along its back are actually similar to those of Kerygmachela, possibly suggesting a shared ancestry.

Another potential aysheaiid is known from the Soom Shale, however it remains unnamed. This lobopodian unusually shows branching limbs, with one broader and one shorter branch on the anteriormost few limbs. The head remains unpreserved, although its specialised frontal appendages are at least partially known with their thinner branch splitting into multiple tips. This lobopodian was found to be close to Palaeocampa and Hadranax in the latter's 2025 redescription on account of a possible second frontal appendage pair.

== Palaeobiology ==
Aysheaia is known from the Burgess Shale, a diverse deep-water escarpment biota with many different genera of most phyla from the time. It is often found associated with sponges, which may suggest it fed on them, however this is unclear. Hadranax is from the less diverse Sirius Passet, a deepwater habitat located near an oxygen minimum zone. It likely was a benthic predator using its long appendages to feel for and capture prey, which may have consisted of small arthropods. Palaeocampa, in contrast to other aysheaiids, lived in brackish to freshwater environments in Mazon Creek and Montceau-les-Mines, alongside amphibians, fish and a wide range of invertebrates including onychophorans. Its toxic, ridged spines likely deterred predators, but as no mouth is preserved the rest of its ecology is uncertain. The Soom Shale aysheaiid also is of unclear ecology, but it was likely benthic as shown by the morphology. It dwelled in a cold southern ocean basin with periods of anoxic water, alongside a low-diversity community mostly consisting of arthropods and chordates.

== Phylogeny ==
Phylogeny of Panarthropoda and lobopodians after Knecht et al. 2025:

- Panarthropoda "Lobopodia"
  - †Diania
  - - †Lenisambulatrix
    - - - †Paucipodia
        - - †Thanahita
          - - †Eoconchariidae
            - - - †Xenusion
                - †Onychodictyon
              - - †Strictocorniculum
                - †Rhombocorniculum
                - †Orstenotubulus
                - †Carbotubulus
                - †Hallucigenia fortis
                - †Hallucigenia sparsa
                - - †"Hallucigenia" hongmeia
                  - - †Cardiodictyon
                    - - Tardigrada (tardigrades)
                      - †Luolishaniida
      - - †Aysheaiidae
          - †Aysheaia
          - - Soom Shale lobopodian (C1947)
            - - †Hadranax
              - †Palaeocampa
        - Antennopoda
          - - †Antennacanthopodia
            - Onychophora (velvet worms)
          - - †Siberiidae
            - - - †Pambdelurion
                - †Kerygmachelidae
              - - †Opabiniidae
                - - †Radiodonta (e.g. Anomalocaris)
                  - Deuteropoda (modern arthropods)
