= Desmond H. Collins =

Desmond H. Collins was a Canadian paleontologist, associate professor of zoology at the University of Toronto and retired curator of invertebrate paleontology at the Royal Ontario Museum. He is most renowned for his work on the Burgess Shale. He died in 2023 due to a dementia-related illness.
