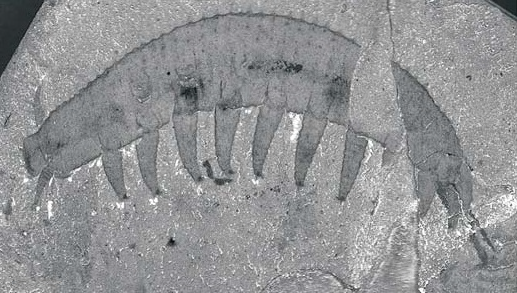
- Aysheaia specimen number USNM 365608

Scientific classification
- Kingdom: Animalia
- Clade: Panarthropoda
- Phylum: †Lobopodia
- Class: †Xenusia
- Order: †Protonychophora
- Family: †Aysheaiidae; Walcott, 1911
- Genus: †Aysheaia; Walcott, 1911
- Species: †A. pedunculata

Binomial name
- †Aysheaia pedunculata Walcott, 1911

= Aysheaia =

Aysheaia Temporal range: Middle Cambrian

Extinct genus of soft-bodied animals

Aysheaia is an extinct genus of soft-bodied lobopodian, known from the Middle Cambrian Burgess Shale of British Columbia, Canada.

== Anatomy ==
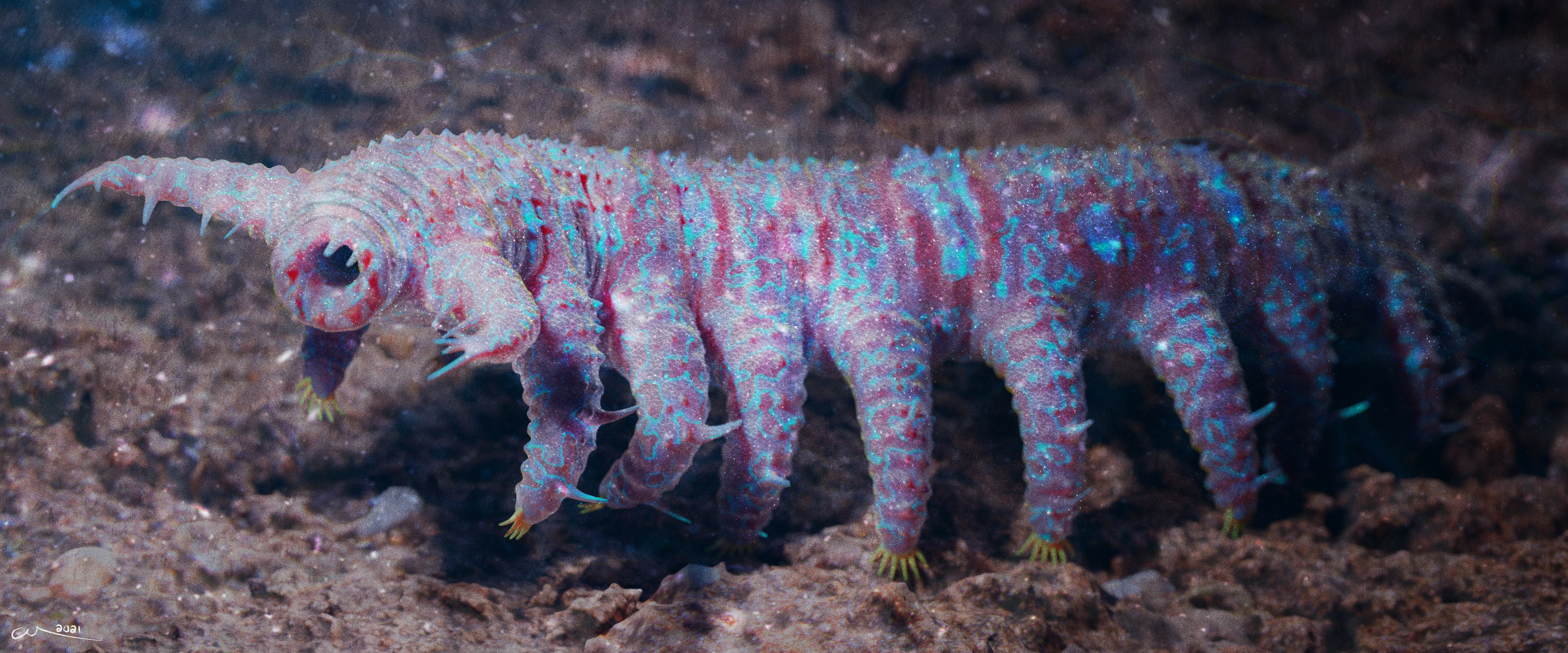

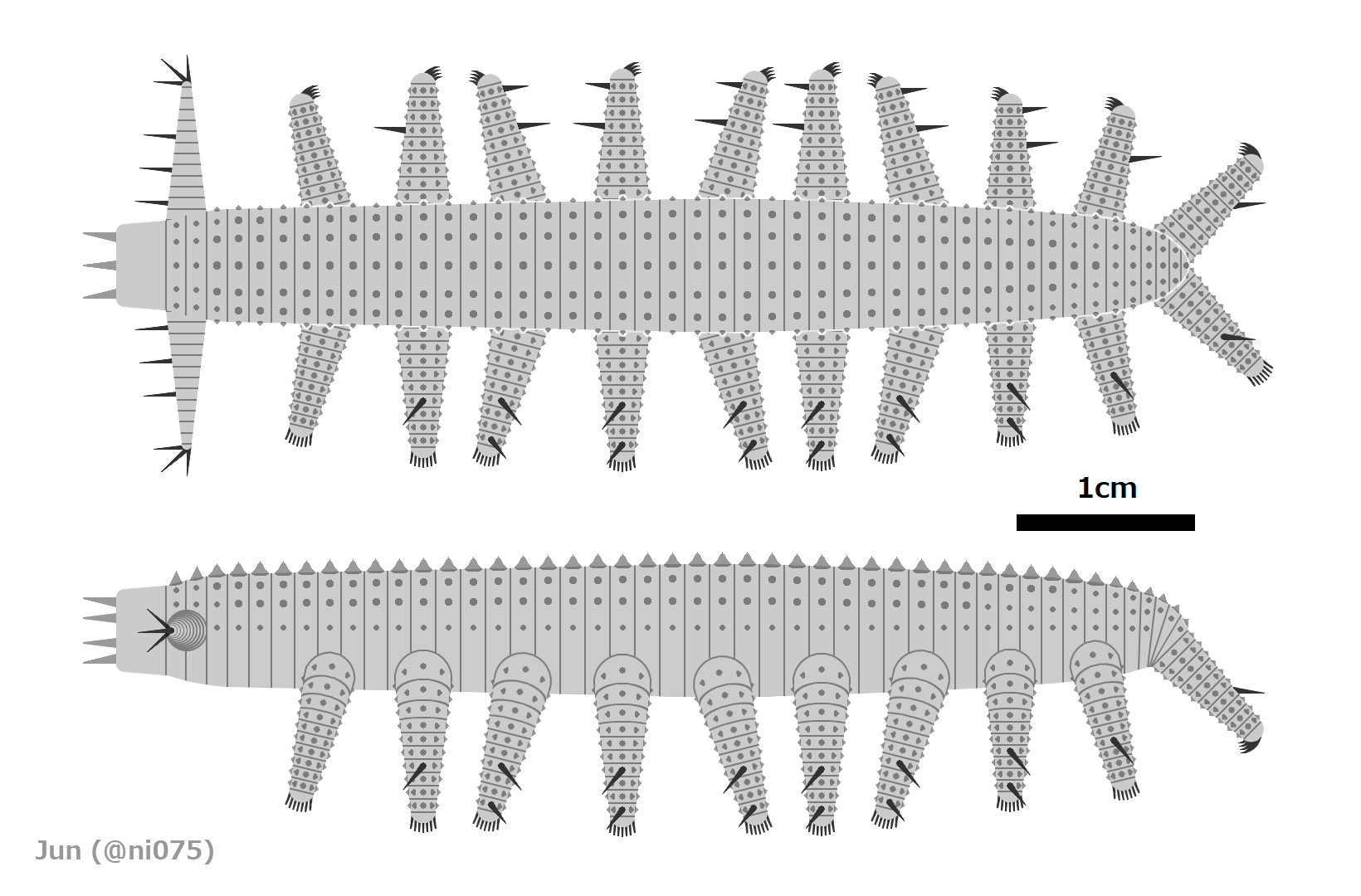
Life and diagrammatic reconstructions of Aysheaia pedunculata

Aysheaia has ten body segments, each of which has a pair of spiked, annulate legs. The animal is segmented, and looks somewhat like a bloated caterpillar with a few spines added on — including six finger-like projections around the mouth and two grasping limbs on the "head". Each leg has a subterminal row of about six curved claws. No jaw apparatus is evident. A pair of legs marks the posterior end of the body, unlike in onychophorans where the anus projects posteriad; this may be an adaptation to the terrestrial habit.

== Ecology ==
Some specimens of Aysheaia have been found associated with sponges, though this does not provide direct evidence of diet.

== Affinity ==
Aysheaia is a lobopodian, an extinct phylum of marine animals that are similar to modern terrestrial Onychophora (velvet worms). Notable differences are the lack of jaws and antennae, possible lack of visual organs, and the terminal mouth.

== Distribution ==
Aysheaia is known from fossils found in the middle Cambrian Burgess Shale of British Columbia. Similar taxa are known from the lower Cambrian Maotianshan shales of China. Other than the 20 specimens from the Greater Phyllopod bed, where they comprise 2% of the community, only 19 specimens of A. pedunculata are known. A. prolata was described as a separate species from the similarly-aged Wheeler Shale Formation of Utah but in fact represents the frontal appendage of a Stanleycaris-like radiodont.

== History of research ==
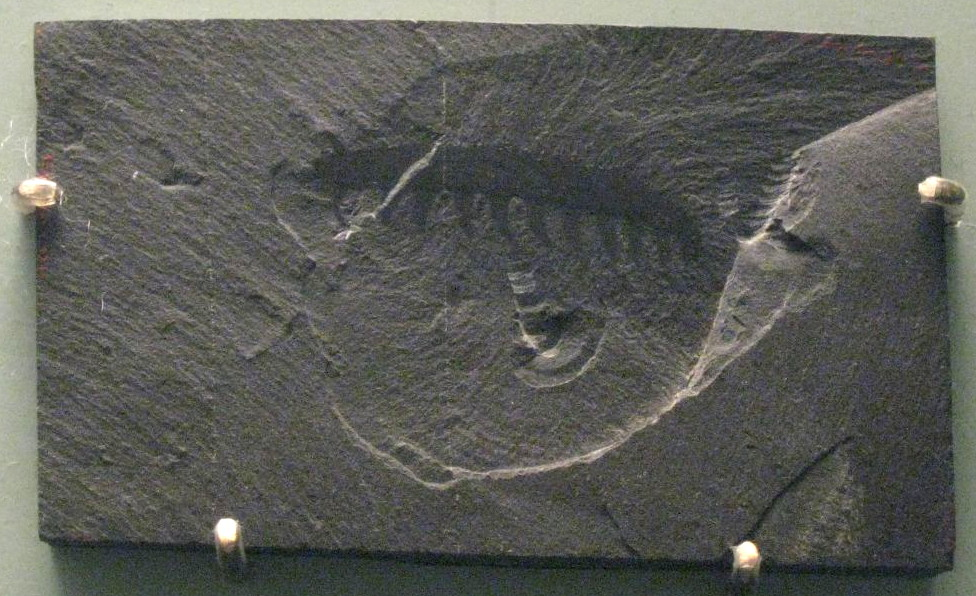
Fossil of A. pedunculata on display at NMNH

=== Description by Walcott (1911) ===
Aysheaia was described by Walcott in his 1911 work on annelid worms; Walcott imagined that a head (not observed) was present to support a polychaete affinity. His attention was soon drawn to the organism's resemblance to velvet worms, which was supported by other early researchers (1920s–30s) who also recognized a similarity with the onychophora, although because Aysheaia does not fall within the range of living onychophora, it has also been allocated to a phylum of its own. Nevertheless, an Onychophoran affinity represented the common opinion until the fossil was redescribed in the late 1970s.

=== Major redescription by Whittington, 1978 ===
In the 1970s, Whittington undertook a thorough redescription, and associated Aysheaia with the tardigrade lineage concept promoted a couple of years earlier by Delle Cave and Simonetta, and first proposed in 1958. Thus, his interpretation places Aysheaia in the stem group to Tardigrada + Onychophora, although the view at the time was that these two modern phyla represented a group within a polyphyletic Arthropoda. A possible link to Xenusion was also brought up, although at this time the affinities of this group were unclear, and a link to the rangeomorphs had been proposed.

=== Response to Whittington (1980s) ===
The response to Whittington's redescription can be loosely classed into three camps: one school, predominantly Bergström, downplayed the similarities to the Onychophora and focussed on the Tardigrade interpretation; whereas others (after Simonetta and Delle Cave) recognized a group of lobopods containing Onychophora, Tardigrada, and Aysheaia (with features of both). Robison preferred to interpret Onychophora as the sister group to Arthropoda, and placed Aysheaia in the Onychophoran stem group in a taxon called Protonychophora (solely containing Aysheaia). These were differentiated from Euonychophora (the crown group) by the number of lobopod legs and claws, the unusual head appendages, the absence of eyes, jaws, antennae and slime glands, the morphology of the rear of the body, and the terminal mouth.

=== Modern era ===
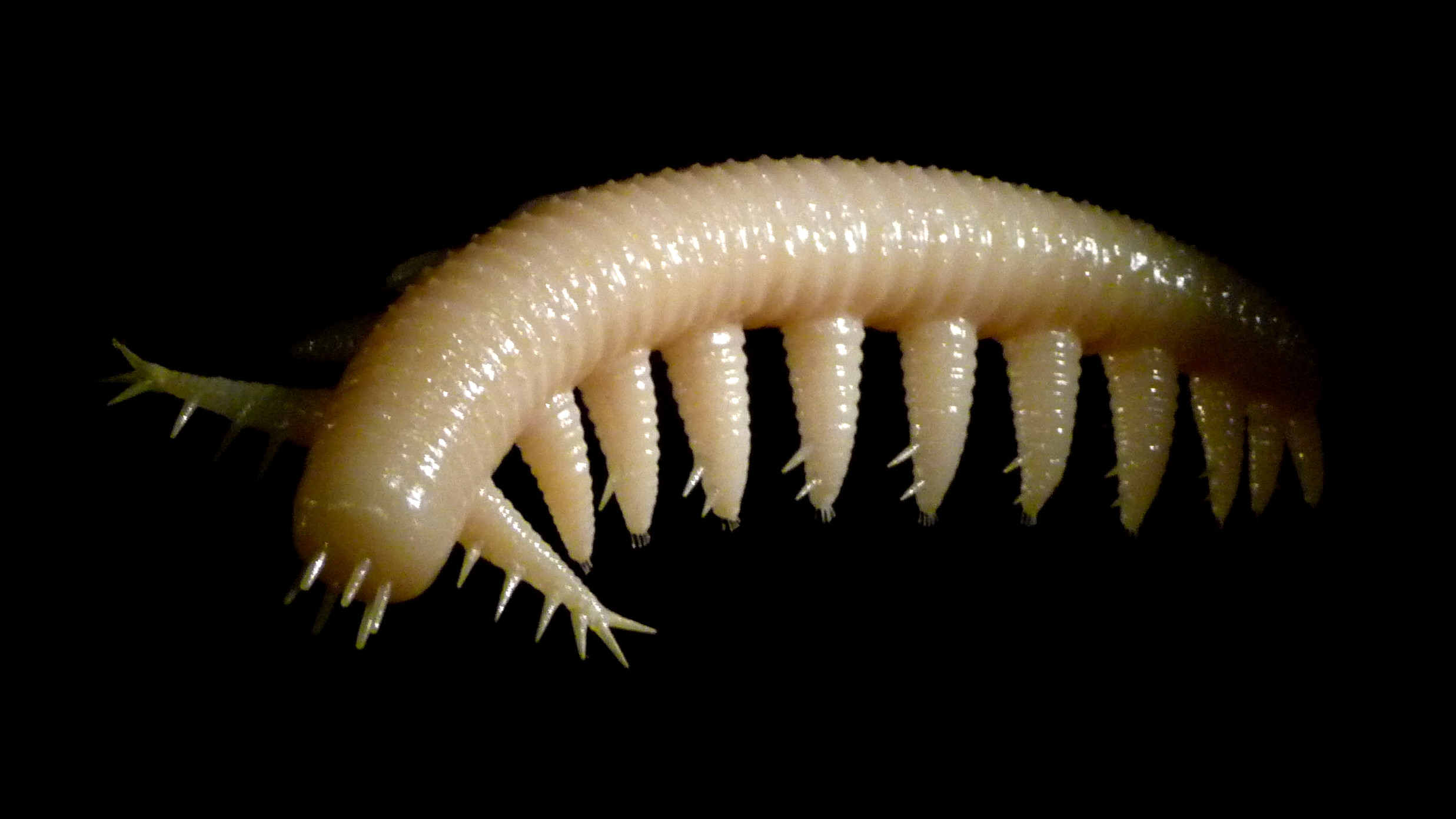
Reconstruction of A. pedunculata

Later work uncovered further material of Xenusion and relatives, particularly from the Chinese fossil deposits. In light of the cladistic revolution of the 1990s, Aysheaia and its relatives were recognized as early offshoots of the lineage leading to arthropods and onychophorans.

Looking from the opposite direction, Budd points out that there are no characters that exclude Aysheaia from the Arthropoda. It may be premature to assign Aysheaia to the Onychophora over Arthropoda, as it lacks any distinctive features of the onychophoran crown group; rather, both Onychophora and Arthropoda may have arisen from animals resembling Aysheaia and its kin. Budd sees Aysheaia-like organisms as representing a paraphyletic grade from which both modern onychophoran and arthropods evolved. The specialised first appendage pair of Aysheaia may be the same as the frontal appendages of Dinocaridida, possibly placing it near this clade.

=== Etymology ===
The genus name commemorates a mountain peak named "Ayesha" due north of the Wapta Glacier. This peak was originally named Aysha in the 1904 maps of the region, and was renamed Ayesha after the heroine of Rider Haggard's 1887 novel She.

== See also ==
- Paleobiota of the Burgess Shale
