= Quadratapora =

Quadratapora Temporal range: Cambrian Stage 3

Scientific classification
- Kingdom: Animalia
- Clade: Panarthropoda
- Phylum: †Lobopodia
- Class: †Xenusia
- Order: †Archonychophora
- Family: †Eoconchariidae
- Genus: †Quadratapora

Species
- Q. zhenbaensis Hao and Shu, 1987 (type); Q. tenuiporatum (Bengtson, Matthews and Missarzhevsky, 1986)

Extinct genus of lobopodians

Quadratapora is a genus of lobopodian known only from its biomineralized dorsal plates, which somewhat resemble those of Microdictyon. Q. tenuiporatum is known from a single specimen that was initially described as dating to the Tommotian, representing (perhaps along with Rhombocorniculum) the earliest record of lobopodians. However, the material is now thought to be Atdabainan in age, reflecting both a mistake in the initial description of the material and a revision of the stratigraphy of the Isit section on the Lena river, from where the single specimen heralds. Q. zhenbaensis is Atdabanian in age.
