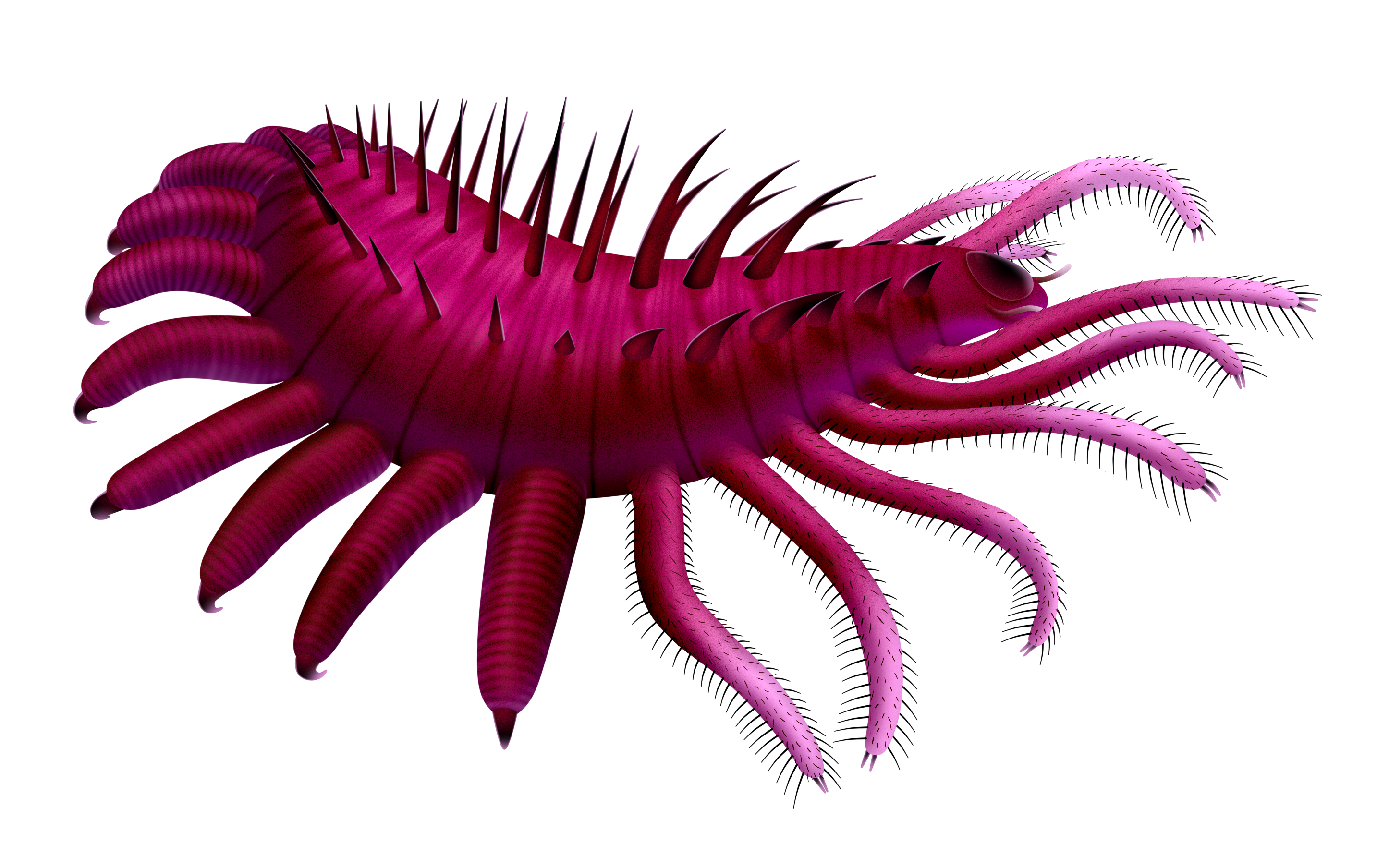
- Life restoration

Scientific classification
- Kingdom: Animalia
- Clade: Panarthropoda
- Phylum: †Lobopodia
- Family: †Luolishaniidae
- Genus: †Collinsovermis; Caron & Aria, 2020
- Species: †C. monstruosus

Binomial name
- †Collinsovermis monstruosus Caron & Aria, 2020

= Collinsovermis =

Collinsovermis Temporal range: Wuliuan

Extinct genus of lobopodians

Collinsovermis is a genus of extinct panarthropod belonging to the group Lobopodia and known from the middle Cambrian Burgess Shale in British Columbia, Canada. It is monotypic having only one species, Collinsovermis monstruosus. After its initial discovery in 1983, Desmond H. Collins popularised it as a unique animal and was subsequently dubbed "Collins' monster" for its unusual super armoured body. The formal scientific description and name were given in 2020. A similar lobopodian is known from the Emu Bay Shale, however it remains unnamed.

== Discovery ==
Collinsovermis was discovered in 1983 by Desmond H. Collins, curator of invertebrate palaeontology at the Royal Ontario Museum, from an expedition at Mount Stephen at the Yoho National Park, British Columbia, Canada. It was found among the Burgess Shale that belonged to the middle Cambrian period called Wuliuan, which is around 509 to 505 million years ago. In 1985, Collins presented the discovery before the Geological Society of America, and published the next year in a popular magazine Rotunda in an article "Paradise revisited." Avoiding the scientific nomenclature and systematic description, he referred to it as a "spiny animal with hairy legs."

=== Naming ===
In 1991, Italian palaeontologists, Laura Delle Cave and Alberto Mario Simonetta published a preliminary description based on Collins's photographs, and gave the nickname "Collins' monster." The complete systematic description and scientific name were given by Jean-Bernard Caron (Royal Ontario Museum and University of Toronto) and Cédric Aria (Nanjing Institute of Geology and Palaeontology, Chinese Academy of Sciences) in 2020 in the journal Palaeontology. The scientific name Collinsovermis monstruosus literally means Collins' wormy monster. As a unique member of Lobopodia, scientists also created a new family for it as Collinsovermidae.

== Description ==
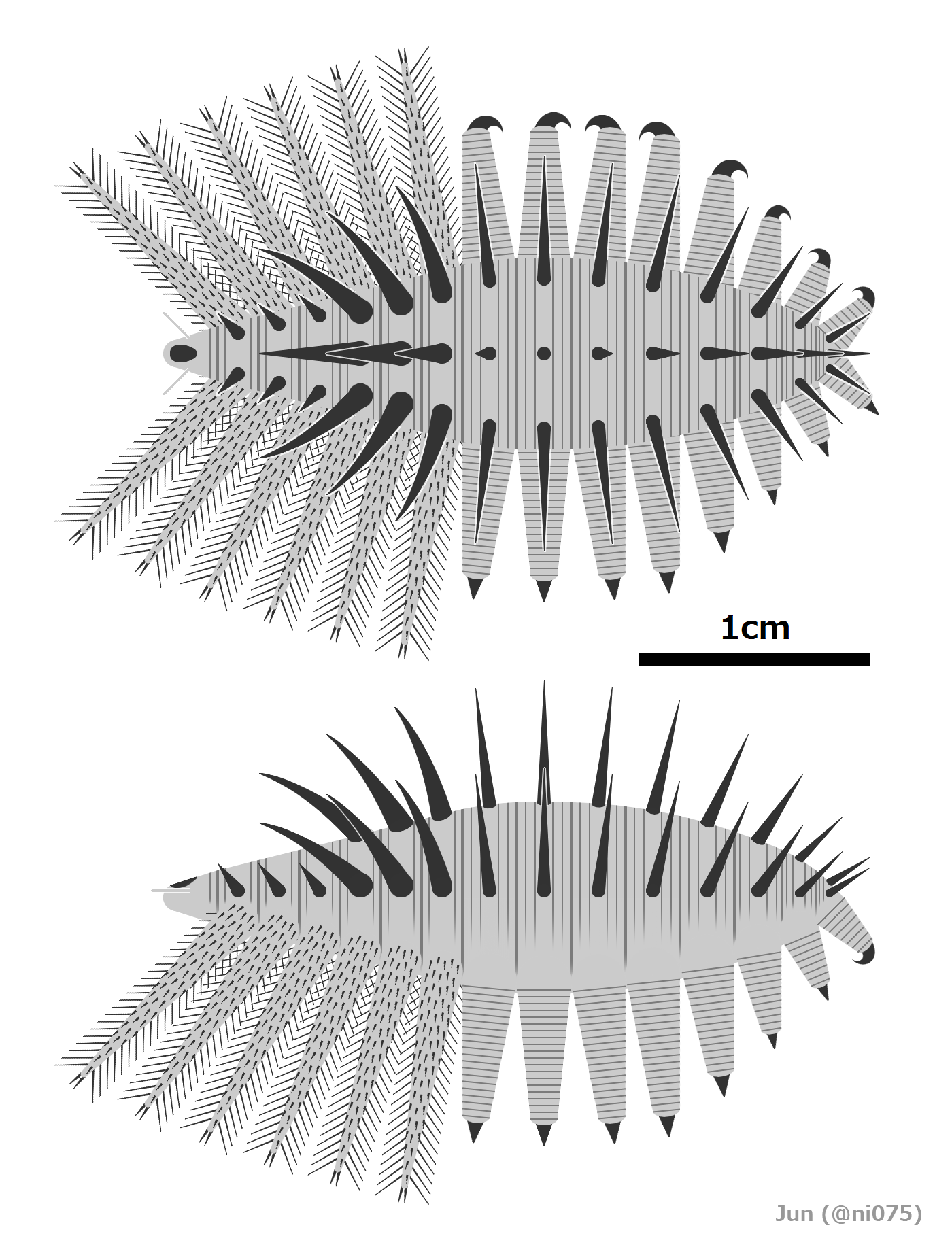
Diagram

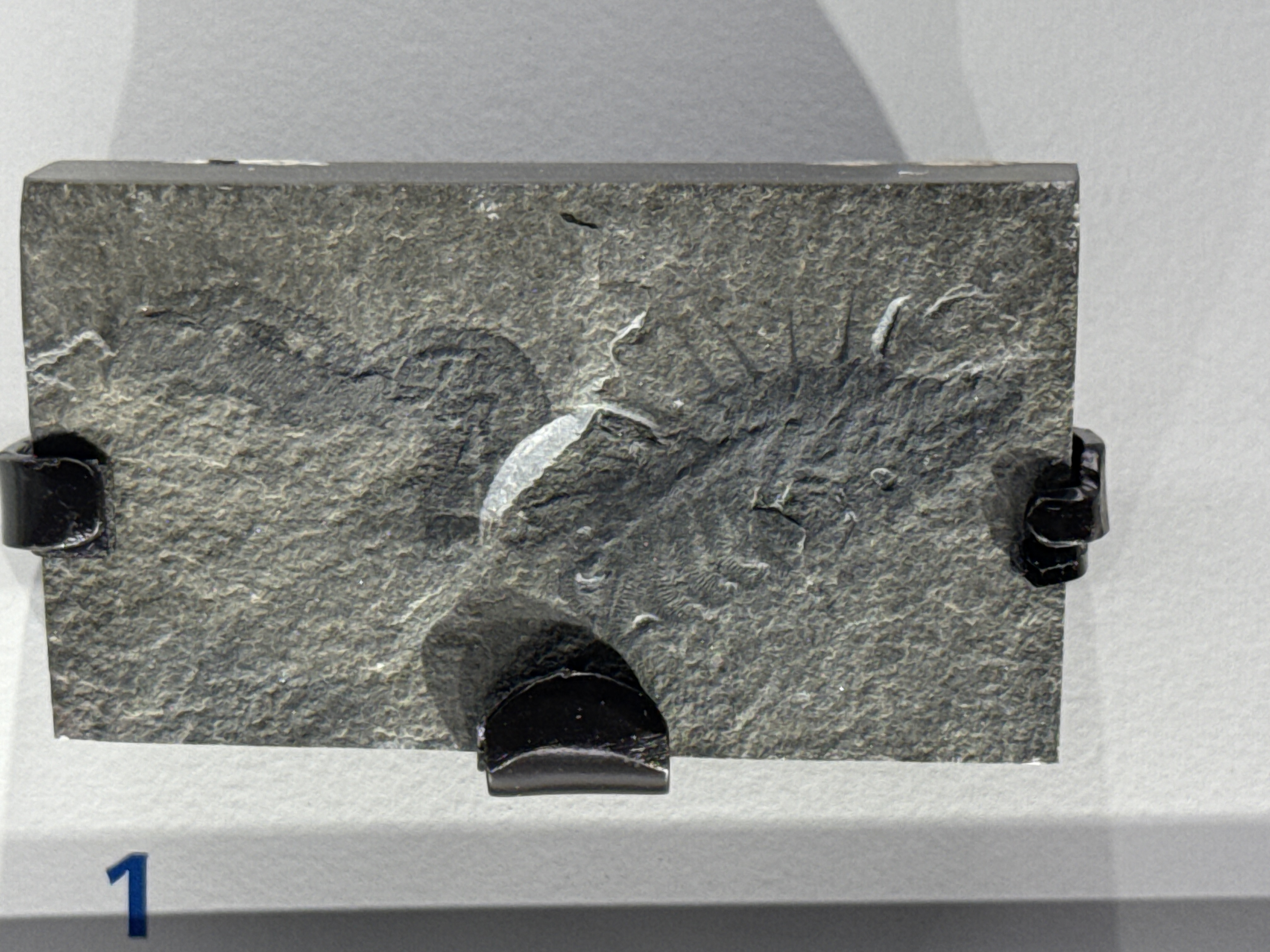
At the Royal Ontario Museum

Collinsovermis is a tiny worm-like soft bodied animal measuring about 3 cm long with multiple pairs of stump legs called lobopods. It bears 14 pairs of lobopods, which are closely attached to the main body unlike in other lobopodians. The anterior six pairs are unusual in that they are much longer than the posterior pairs or typical lobopod, and they are attached with fine curved spinules in about 20 pairs arranged in a V (chevron)-shaped stripe. These limbs are also covered in fine setae, and end with a terminal claw. The eight posterior lobopods are stout and smooth, and each with a terminal curved claw. There are pairs of spines matching to each pair of lobopods (on each body segment or somite) on its back, which were likely served a defensive function. The spines are larger at the middle region of the body and taper towards both ends.

The general body appearance resembles that of Luolishania longicruris (discovered in 1989 in China), which is but smaller and with more posterior lobopods. The head is rounded, small, covered with sclerite (exoskeleton) and has a mouth at its front. Such external body sclerites are also present L. longicruris but absent in other closely related luolishaniid lobopods such as Collinsium (discovered in 2015 from China, popularly known as "Hairy Collins's monster") and Acinocricus (discovered in 1988 from Utah, US). The head also bears a pair of antennae-like projections. Collinsovermis is regarded as characteristically most closely related to Acinocricus, with the major differences being large size (up to 10 cm long), five pairs of anterior legs, absence of sclerites and presence of numerous rows of back spines in the latter.

== Classification ==
Below is an internal phylogeny of Luolishaniida after Knecht et al. 2025:

- Luolishaniida
  - - †Ovatiovermis
    - †Facivermis
  - - †Luolishania
    - †Collinsovermidae
      - †EBS Collinsovermid (SAM P14848)
      - - †Acinocricus
        - - †Collinsovermis
          - - †Collinsium
            - †Entothyreos

== Ecology ==
Like other "luolishaniid" lobopodians, Collinsovermis is thought to have been a sessile suspension feeder, using the posterior pairs of limbs to anchor itself to a substrate, while using its spinose anterior appendages to catch small food particles.
