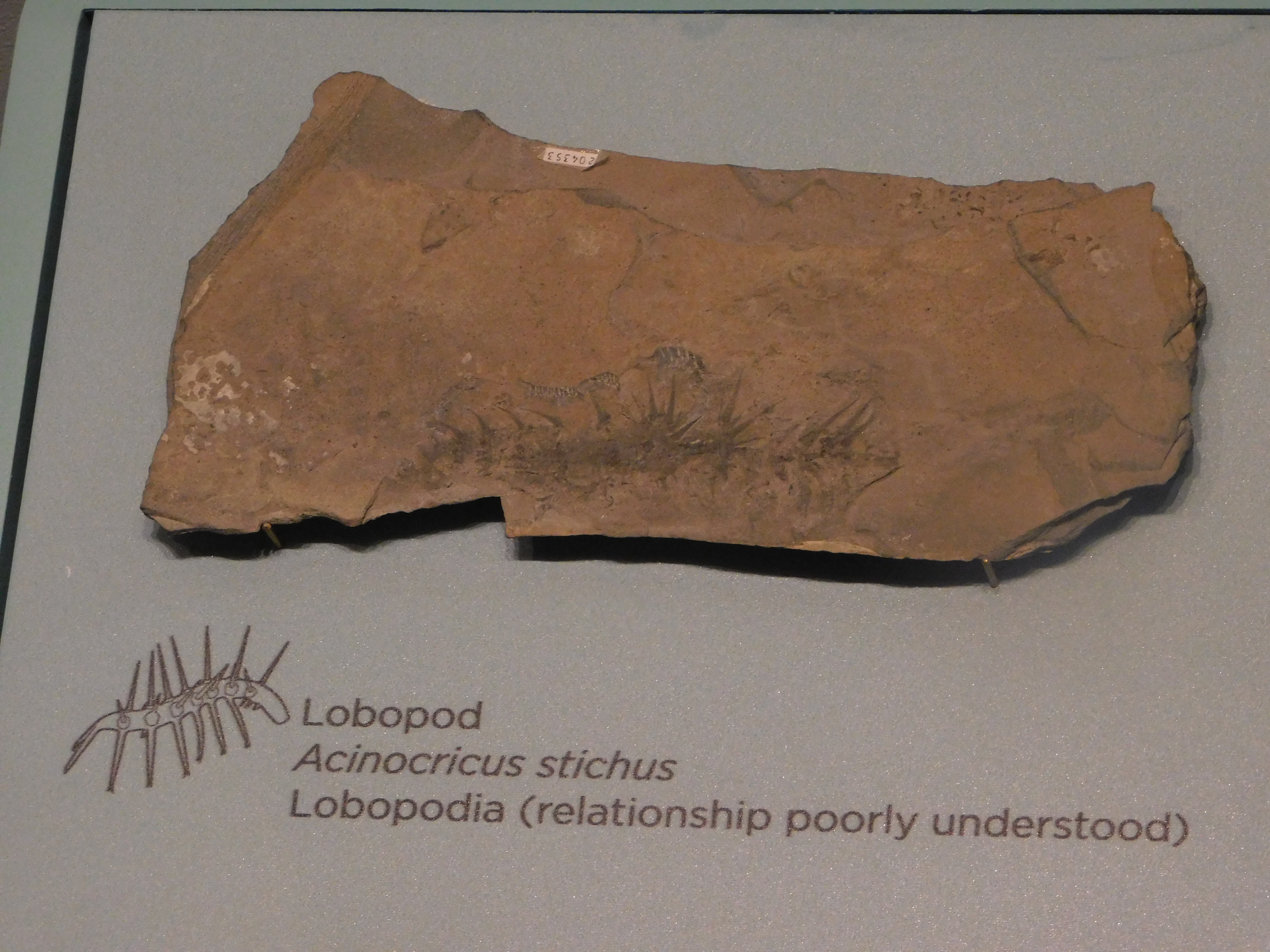
- Holotype specimen on display at the University of Kansas Natural History Museum

Scientific classification
- Kingdom: Animalia
- Clade: Panarthropoda
- Phylum: †Lobopodia
- Family: †Luolishaniidae
- Genus: †Acinocricus; Conway-Morris & Robison, 1988
- Species: †A. stichus

Binomial name
- †Acinocricus stichus Conway-Morris & Robison, 1988

= Acinocricus =

Acinocricus Temporal range: Middle Cambrian

Extinct genus of lobopodians

Acinocricus is a genus of extinct panarthropod belonging to the group Lobopodia and known from the middle Cambrian Spence Shale of Utah, United States. As a monotypic genus, it has one species Acinocricus stichus. The only lobopodian discovered from the Spence Shale, it was described by Simon Conway Morris and Richard A. Robison in 1988. Owing to the original fragmentary fossils discovered since 1982, it was initially classified as an alga, but later realised to be an animal belonging to Cambrian fauna.

== Discovery and naming ==
The first specimen of Acinocricus was discovered by American palaeontologist Lloyd Gunther in 1982 from the Spence Shale in Miners Hollow, Wellsville Mountains, Utah. It was embedded in hardened mud and was incomplete with some of its body part missing. More than a dozen fragmentary fossils were later recovered from the same site and the surrounding areas. Simon Conway Morris of the University of Cambridge and Richard A. Robison of the University of Kansas jointly published the systematic description and scientific name in 1988. The generic name is derived from two Greek words, akaina, meaning thorn or spine, and krikos, meaning ring or circle, for the circular spines on its body; the specific name stichos means row or line, referring to the arrangement of the spines. Conway Morris and Robison made an erroneous classification by assigning it as an alga (in the phylum Chlorophyta) as they were convinced that it had no particular resemblance to any known animal fossils (medusoid) known at the time.

The correct identification as an animal came only after a series of discoveries of Cambrian fossils (Maotianshan Shales) in Chengjian, China. A variety of lobopods were discovered in the early 1990s that showed important shared features with Acinocricus. Comparison of the Chengjian lobopods and Acinocricus revealed their similarities. In 1998, Jun-yuan Chen (Nanjing Institute of Geology and Palaeontology, Chinese Academy of Sciences) and Lars Ramsköld (Uppsala University, Sweden) made assessment of all available Cambrian lobopod fossils and came to the conclusion that Acinocricus belongs to Lobopodia.

== Description ==
Acinocricus is a soft-bodies worm-like animal having numerous stumpy legs called lobopods. It is most easily distinguished from spiral spines on its back. It is for this appearance that it was originally believed as having body whorls that give a thallus-like structure and classified as an alga. It is similar to other lobopods such as Luolishania longicruris, Collinsovermis monstruosus, Collinsium ciliosum in having several pairs of legs and spines on each body segment (somite). It is for these reasons that it also classified under the family Luolishaniidae. Its major difference is that its spines are arranged in multiple rows on each somite, unlike in single pairs in other lobopods. The spines are arranged in rows, and each row contains alternating large and small spines. The large spines measure up to 1.5. cm long, while the small spines are in at least two different sizes of less than 0.1 cm long.

The exact number of the rows of spine and lobopods is difficult to make out due to fragmentary fossils. There are at least 12 pairs of lobopods, and the first five pairs are different from the rest in being longer and slender. The total length of the body can be up to 10 cm long. It is considered as lacking hardened body covering (sclerite). It is regarded as characteristically most closely related to Collinsovermis, with the major differences being its larger size, fewer anterior legs, absence of sclerites and its numerous rows of back spines.

== Classification ==
Below is an internal phylogeny of Luolishaniida after Knecht et al. 2025:

- Luolishaniida
  - - †Ovatiovermis
    - †Facivermis
  - - †Luolishania
    - †Collinsovermidae
      - †EBS Collinsovermid (SAM P14848)
      - - †Acinocricus
        - - †Collinsovermis
          - - †Collinsium
            - †Entothyreos
