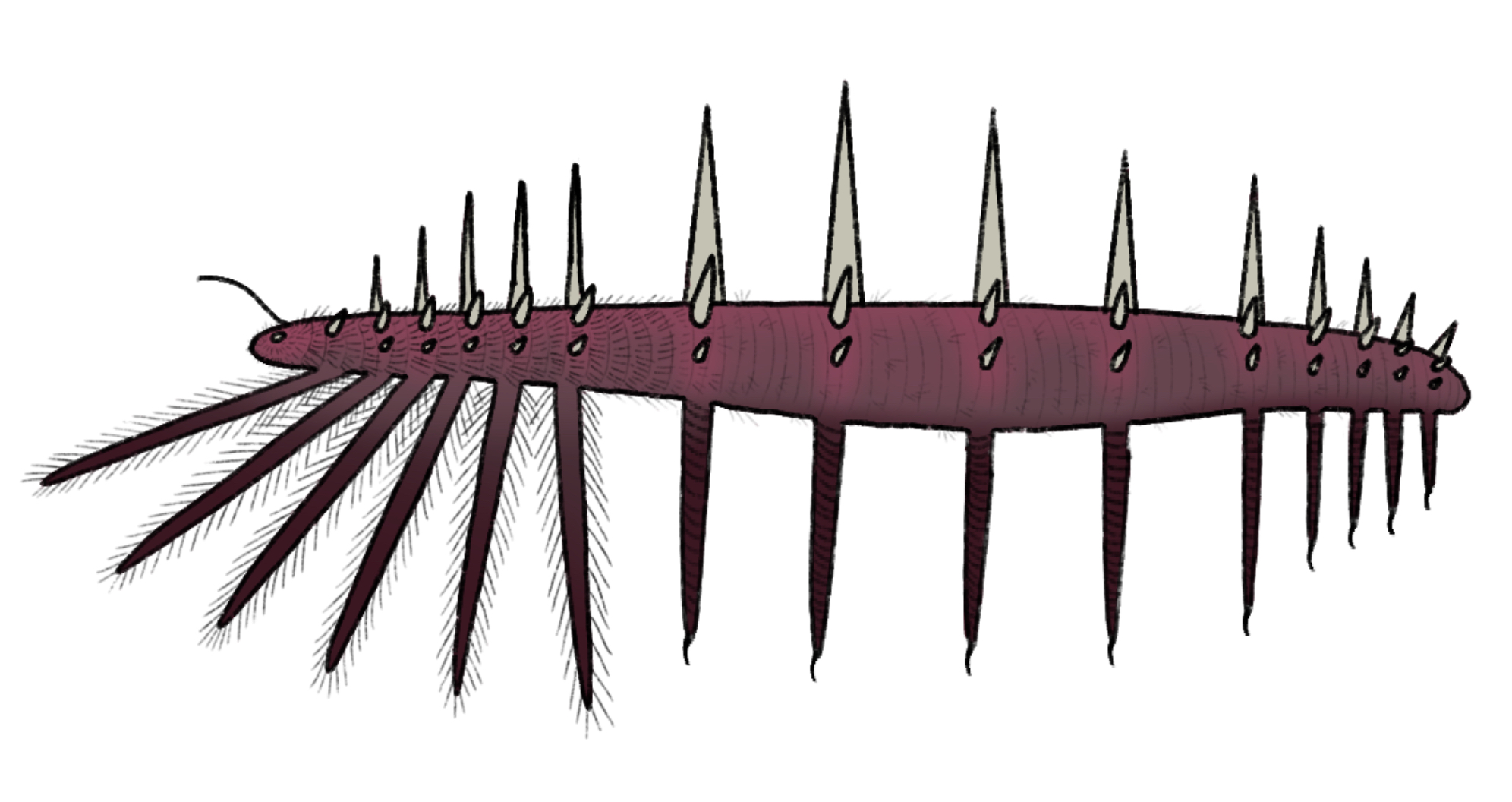
- Artistic reconstruction of the animal

Scientific classification
- Kingdom: Animalia
- Clade: Panarthropoda
- Phylum: †Lobopodia
- Family: †Luolishaniidae
- Genus: †Collinsium; Yang et al., 2015
- Species: †C. ciliosum

Binomial name
- †Collinsium ciliosum Yang et al., 2015

= Collinsium =

Collinsium Temporal range: Cambrian Stage 3–Middle Cambrian

Extinct genus of Cambrian animals

Collinsium was a genus of lobopodian from the Early Cambrian. It is represented by a single fossil species, Collinsium ciliosum, found in the Xiaoshiba Lagerstätte (Hongjingshao Formation) of China. Similar to the later Hallucigenia it was a small worm-like creature with spikes along its back and feeding tentacles near its head. Unlike Hallucigenia, Collinsium had 9 walking appendages and 6 fine anterior appendages. Its body was covered in hair-like papillae and its fine anterior appendages were lined with setae. The generic name honors paleontologist Desmond Collins.

== Description ==
Collinsium was a small animal with complete specimens reaching 85mm in length. 15 sets of biomineralized spines lined its back. All but the first set were composed of one large medial spine, a pair of medium spines, and a pair of small lateral spines. The first six appendage pairs were long and lined with approximately 30 pairs of bristle-like setae that angled downward to form chevrons. Small setae were present across the body, densely covering the anterior portion and thinning out into sparse clusters along the posterior portion. It was likely suited for climbing or anchoring on hard surfaces and used its long appendages to filter feed.

== Taxonomy ==
The armor structures of Collinsium are unique compared to most lobopodians. It closely resembles Luolishania and Collinsovermis, both similarly armored, and is placed within Luolishaniidae.

Below is an internal phylogeny of Luolishaniida after Knecht et al. 2025:

- Luolishaniida
  - - †Ovatiovermis
    - †Facivermis
  - - †Luolishania
    - †Collinsovermidae
      - †EBS Collinsovermid (SAM P14848)
      - - †Acinocricus
        - - †Collinsovermis
          - - †Collinsium
            - †Entothyreos
