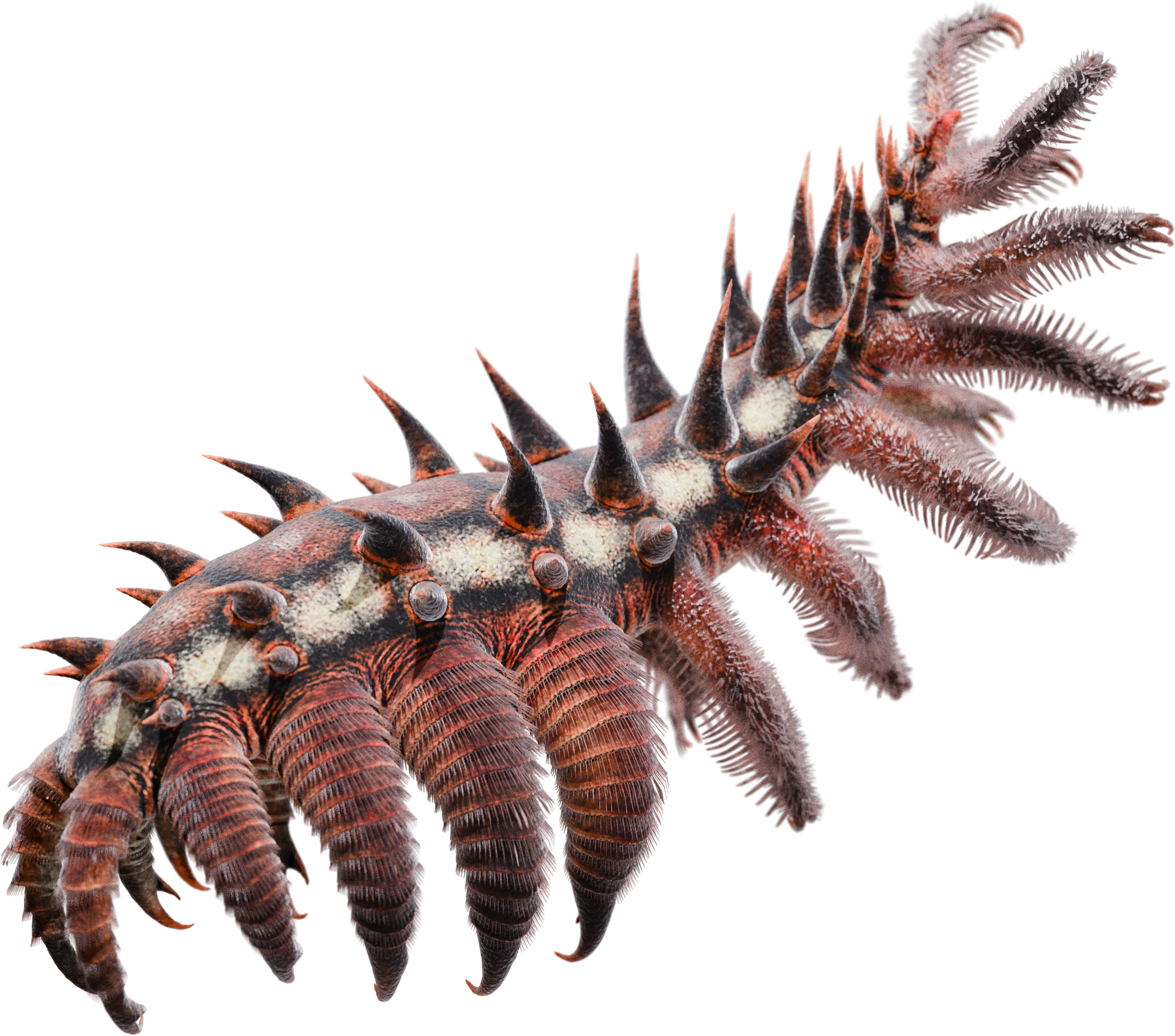
- Life restoration

Scientific classification
- Kingdom: Animalia
- Clade: Panarthropoda
- Phylum: †Lobopodia
- Family: †Luolishaniidae
- Genus: †Entothyreos; Aria & Caron, 2024
- Species: †E. synnaustrus

Binomial name
- †Entothyreos synnaustrus Aria & Caron, 2024

= Entothyreos =

Entothyreos Temporal range: Middle Cambrian (Wuliuan)

Extinct genus of lobopodians

Entothyreos is a genus of extinct panarthropod belonging to the group Lobopodia and known from the middle Cambrian Burgess Shale in British Columbia, Canada. The genus contains a single species, Entothyreos synnaustrus (meaning "convergent inner shield"), described in 2024. Entothyreos is significant for possessing a remarkable degree of sclerotization among lobopodians, comparable to that of arthropods.

== Description ==
Entothyreos is a stout collinsovermid lobopodian, capable of reaching roughly 5 cm (2.0 in) in length. The dorsum was protected by numerous paired sclerite spines (two pairs per trunk segment). The spines are longest at the middle of the body. These spines are associated (although still dissociable) with subrectangular sclerotic sheets which lie just below the cuticle surface. These sclerite sheets may have increased body rigidity, allowing easier erection of the body to allow for suspension feeding from the water column. They are comparable with the sclerotic rings found in other luolishaniids, which probably evolved at first to allow for the otherwise soft body to carry numerous large spines. Additionally, the head segment bears two pairs of small sclerite spines (with no apparent underlying sclerotic sheet), and a pair of soft antenniform sensory structures.

Entothyreos possessed eleven pairs of lobopodous limbs, divided into two sets. The anterior set of six limb pairs are elongate and lined with two rows of large, sclerotized setae, which allowed the animal to sieve food particles from the water. These limbs were also covered in numerous shorter, fine setae on their dorsal side, and tipped with a pair of sickle-shaped claws. The posterior five pairs are thick and conical, each tipped with a single, large, highly developed claw. The annuli of these posterior limbs are highly sclerotized, the margins of which are lined with short setae of alternating lengths. The posterior claws have an additional branch near their base opposing the tip like a claw, unique to Entothyreos, which aided in anchoring to substrate. The final, posterior-most pair of limbs have annuli differentiated into seven sclerotized sheets, which covered at least the dorsal surface of the limb, probably for further protection. While not truly arthropodized (they are likely not articulated with an arthrodial membrane), the degree of sclerotization present does represent a remarkable convergence with arthropods.

== Classification ==
Below is an internal phylogeny of Luolishaniida after Knecht et al. 2025:

- Luolishaniida
  - - †Ovatiovermis
    - †Facivermis
  - - †Luolishania
    - †Collinsovermidae
      - †EBS Collinsovermid (SAM P14848)
      - - †Acinocricus
        - - †Collinsovermis
          - - †Collinsium
            - †Entothyreos

== Ecology ==
Entothyreos is relatively common compared with other Burgess Shale lobopodians, being initially described from a suite of fifty-one fossil specimens. One slab, preserving a large amount of organisms including Anomalocaris, Peytoia, and some sponges, contains nine different individual specimens of Entothyreos. All fossil specimens derive from the Tulip Beds locality of the Burgess Shale (found at the base of the Campsite Cliff Shale Member, making it one of the oldest Burgess Shale localities), which represents a more distal environment, further from the Cathedral Escarpment than the more famous Walcott Quarry. The Tulip Beds' paleoenvironment is dominated by sessile animals, particularly suspension feeders. Entothyreos likely used its posterior limb pairs to anchor itself to a raised substrate (e.g. sponges), and then used its frontal limb pairs to sieve food particles from the water column. The posterior portion of the body is often poorly preserved, which the authors speculate could be caused by kinetic force of burial (a mudflow) tearing apart the body, as the anchoring claws are still firmly embedded in substrate. Comparable signs of tearing are seen in other sessile Burgess Shale taxa.

Of the fifty-one individual specimens studied, four of them are of a slightly different morphology. This much rarer subset has a more compact body and longer dorsal spines. However, they are roughly the same overall length as the more common morph, and occur on the same bedding planes. This indicates that Entothyreos may have been sexually dimorphic.
