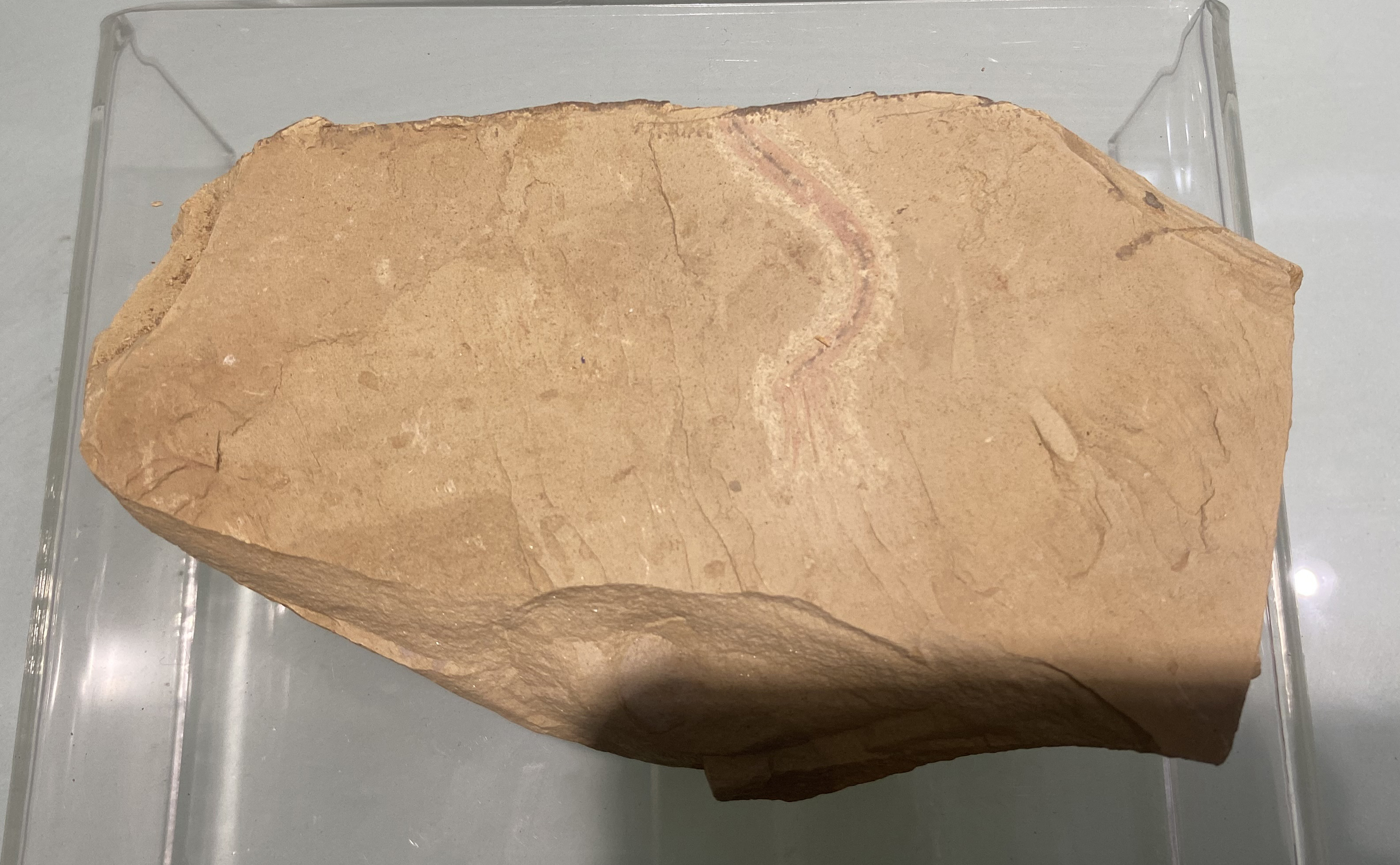
- Fossil of Facivermis yunnanicus in Yuxi Museum

Scientific classification
- Kingdom: Animalia
- Clade: Panarthropoda
- Phylum: †Lobopodia
- Family: †Luolishaniidae
- Genus: †Facivermis; Hou & Chen 1989

Species
- F. yunnanicus Hou & Chen, 1989; F. longiusula (Hu, 2002)

= Facivermis =

Facivermis Temporal range: Lower Cambrian Chengjiang

Extinct genus of panarthropods

Facivermis (meaning "torch worm") is a genus of sessile lobopodian from the Lower Cambrian Maotianshan shales of China

== Description ==
Facivermis was a worm-like creature up to 90 mm long. Its body was divided into three sections. The anterior section had five equally sized pairs of appendages with two setal rows along the margins. The middle section was elongate and five times longer than the anterior or posterior. The posterior section was pear-shaped and had three rows of hooks surrounding the anus.

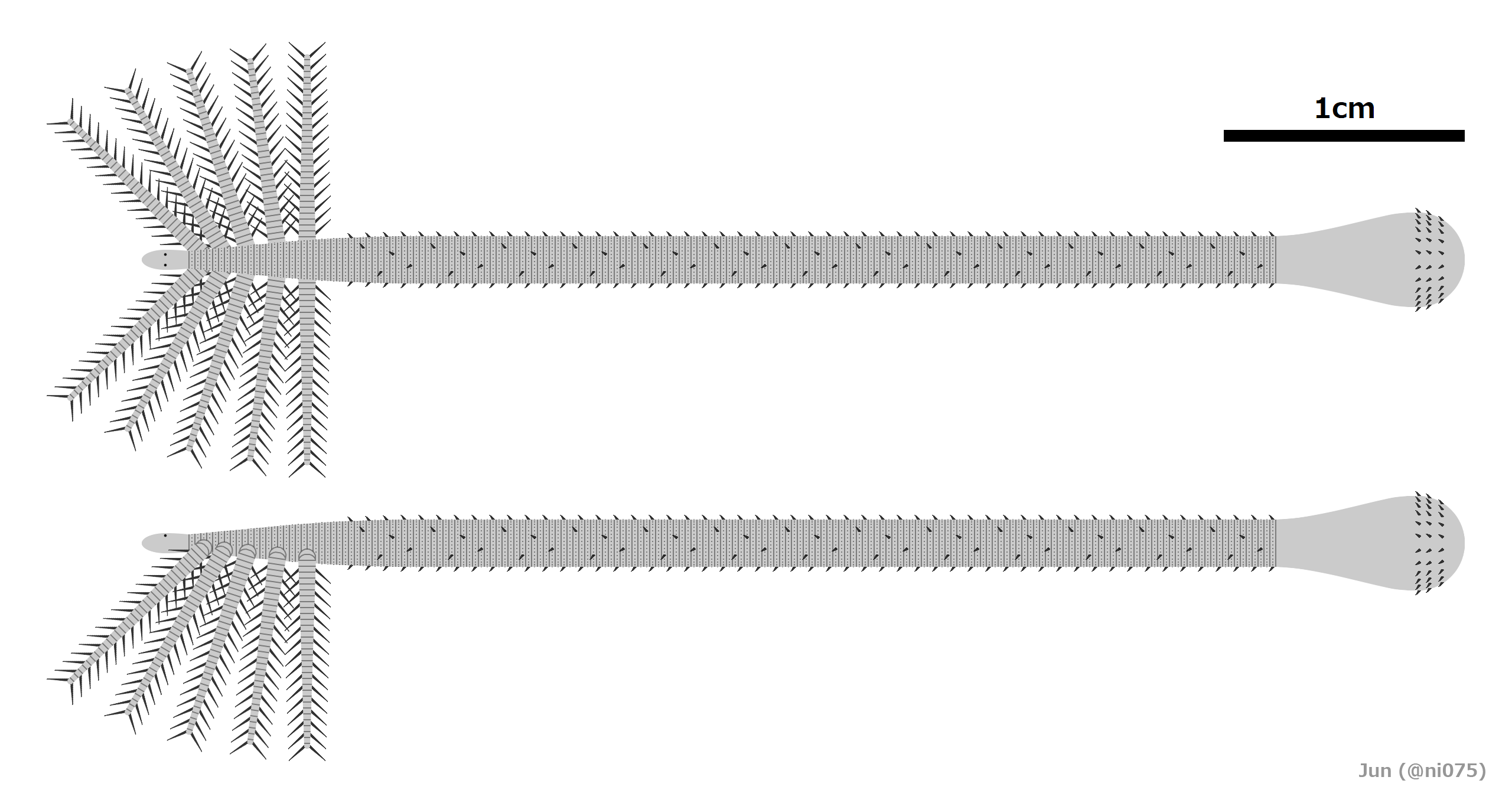
Diagrammatic Reconstruction of Facivermis yunnanicus

== Classification ==
Facivermis was considered by its describers to be a polychaete worm. An affinity to the unusual crustacean lineage Pentastomida has also been proposed, but is seen as unlikely. Since its discovery, however, most evidence has supported its being a lobopodian. Liu et al. draw a comparison to the known lobopodian Miraluolishania. Liu et al. also note that the pear-shaped end bears a close resemblance to the proboscis of priapulid worms if it is interpreted as being the anterior end. The possible priapulid "Xishania" longiusula's fragmentary remains closely resembles the pear-shaped end of Facivermis, so Huang et al. assigned "X". longiusula to Facivermis as a second species. In 2020, new specimens of the organism were found with a preserved tube, showing that it was a sessile tube worm-like lobopodian belonging to Luolishaniidae, with a bulbous posterior.

Below is an internal phylogeny of Luolishaniida after Knecht et al. 2025:

- Luolishaniida
  - - †Ovatiovermis
    - †Facivermis
  - - †Luolishania
    - †Collinsovermidae
      - †EBS Collinsovermid (SAM P14848)
      - - †Acinocricus
        - - †Collinsovermis
          - - †Collinsium
            - †Entothyreos

== Ecology ==
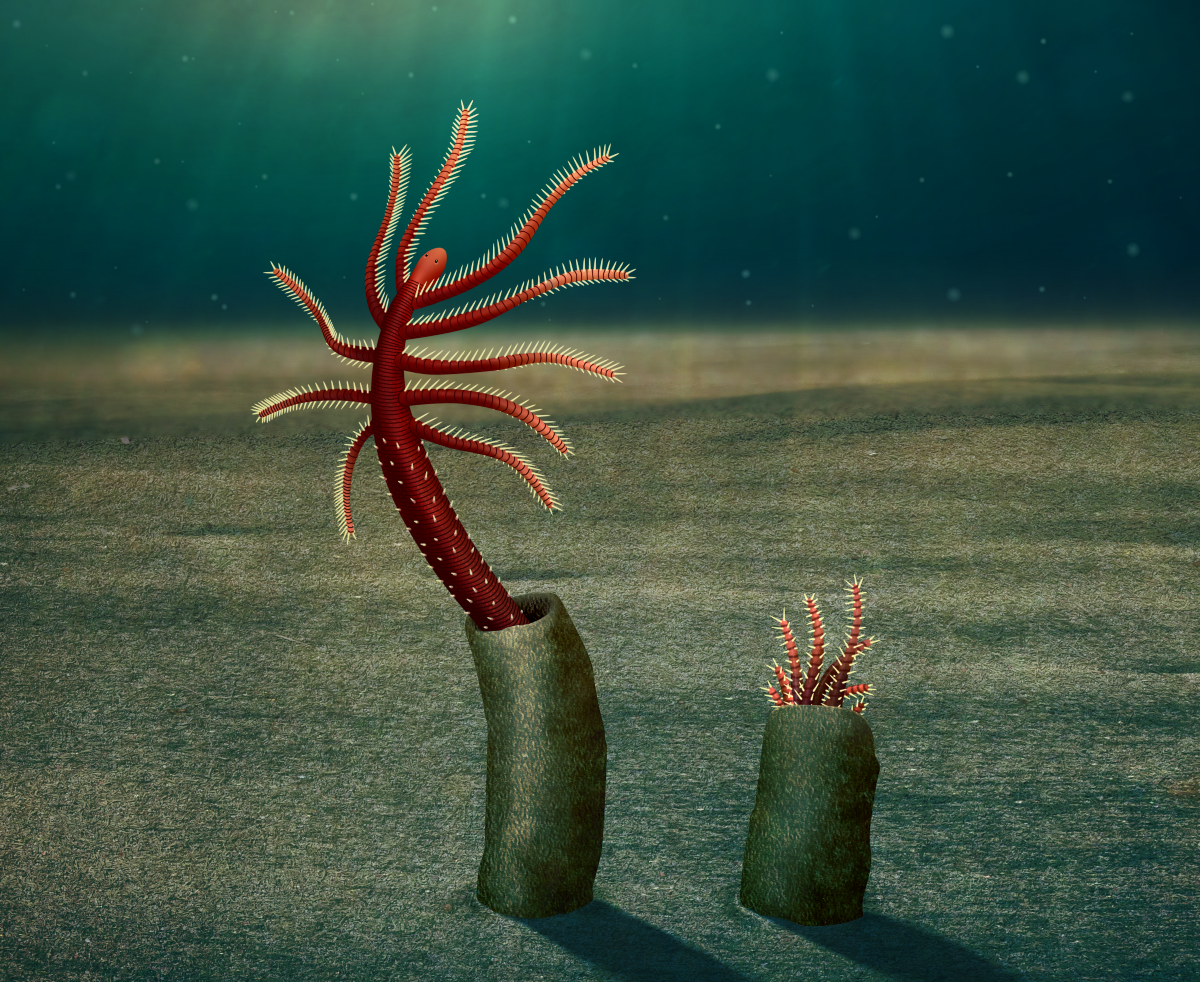
Ecological restoration of Facivermis extended and hidden inside their tubes.

Facivermis was previously interpreted as a predator that anchored itself into sediment with its hooked posterior end and used its anterior appendages to catch prey. One fossil has a possible bradoriid preserved in its gut. However the new specimens described in 2020 suggest a suspension-feeding lifestyle similar to feather duster worms, with the posterior hooks used to anchor itself into their cylindrical tube.
