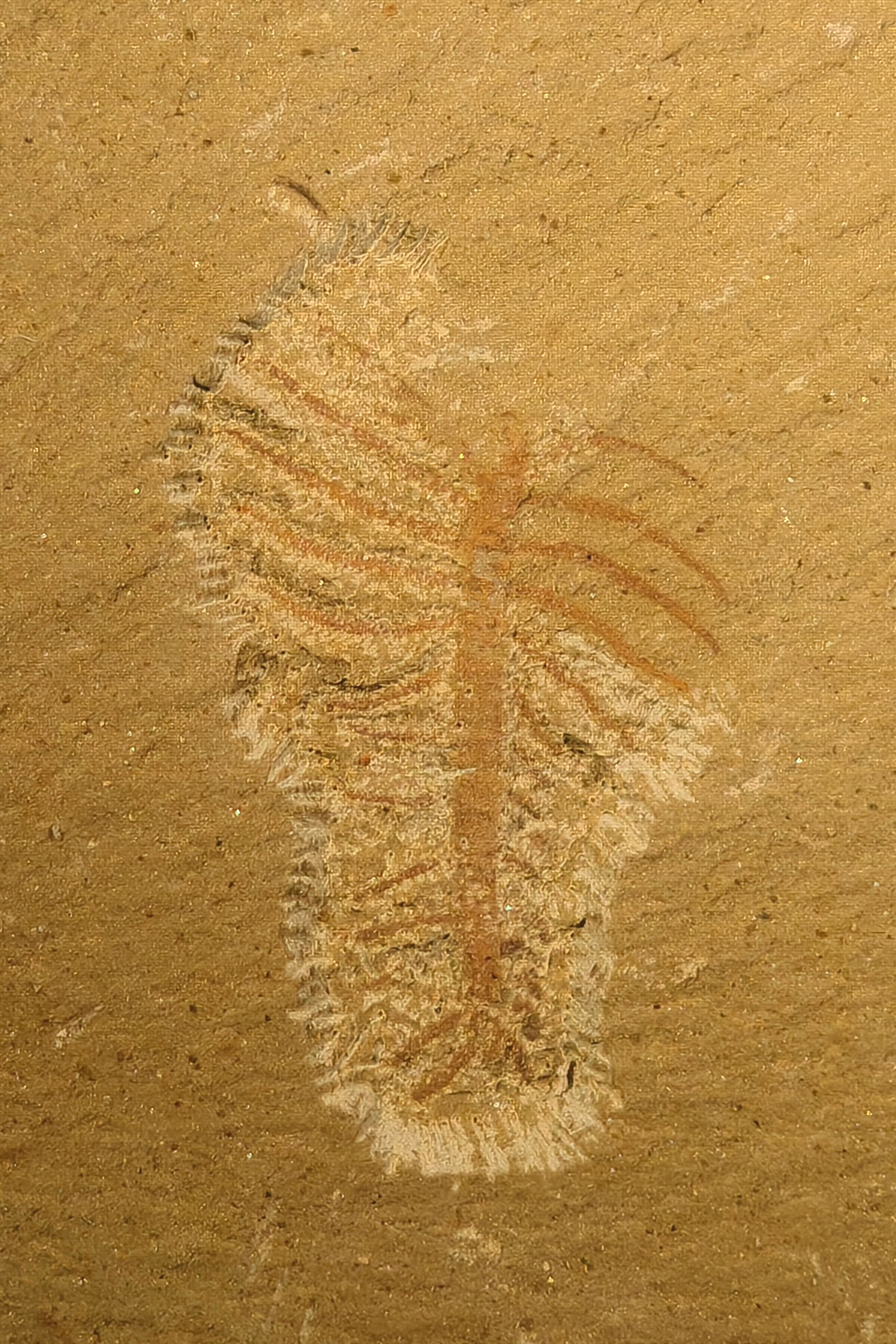
- Fossil of Luolishania

Scientific classification
- Kingdom: Animalia
- Clade: Panarthropoda
- Phylum: †Lobopodia
- Family: †Luolishaniidae
- Genus: †Luolishania; Hou & Chen, 1989
- Species: †L. longicruris

Binomial name
- †Luolishania longicruris Hou & Chen, 1989

= Luolishania =

Luolishania Temporal range: Cambrian stage 3

Extinct genus of lobopodian panarthropod

Luolishania is an extinct genus of lobopodian panarthropod and known from the Lower Cambrian Chiungchussu Formation (Maotianshan Shales) of the Chengjiang County, Yunnan Province, China. A monotypic genus, it contains one species Luolishania longicruris. It was discovered and described by Hou Xian-Guang and Chen Jun-Yuan in 1989. It is one of the superarmoured Cambrian lobopodians suspected to be either an intermediate form in the origin of velvet worms (Onychophora) or basal to at least Tardigrada and Arthropoda. It is the basis of the family name Luolishaniidae, which also include other related lobopods such as Acinocricus, Collinsium, Facivermis, and Ovatiovermis. Along with Microdictyon, it is the first lobopodian fossil discovered from China.

== Discovery ==
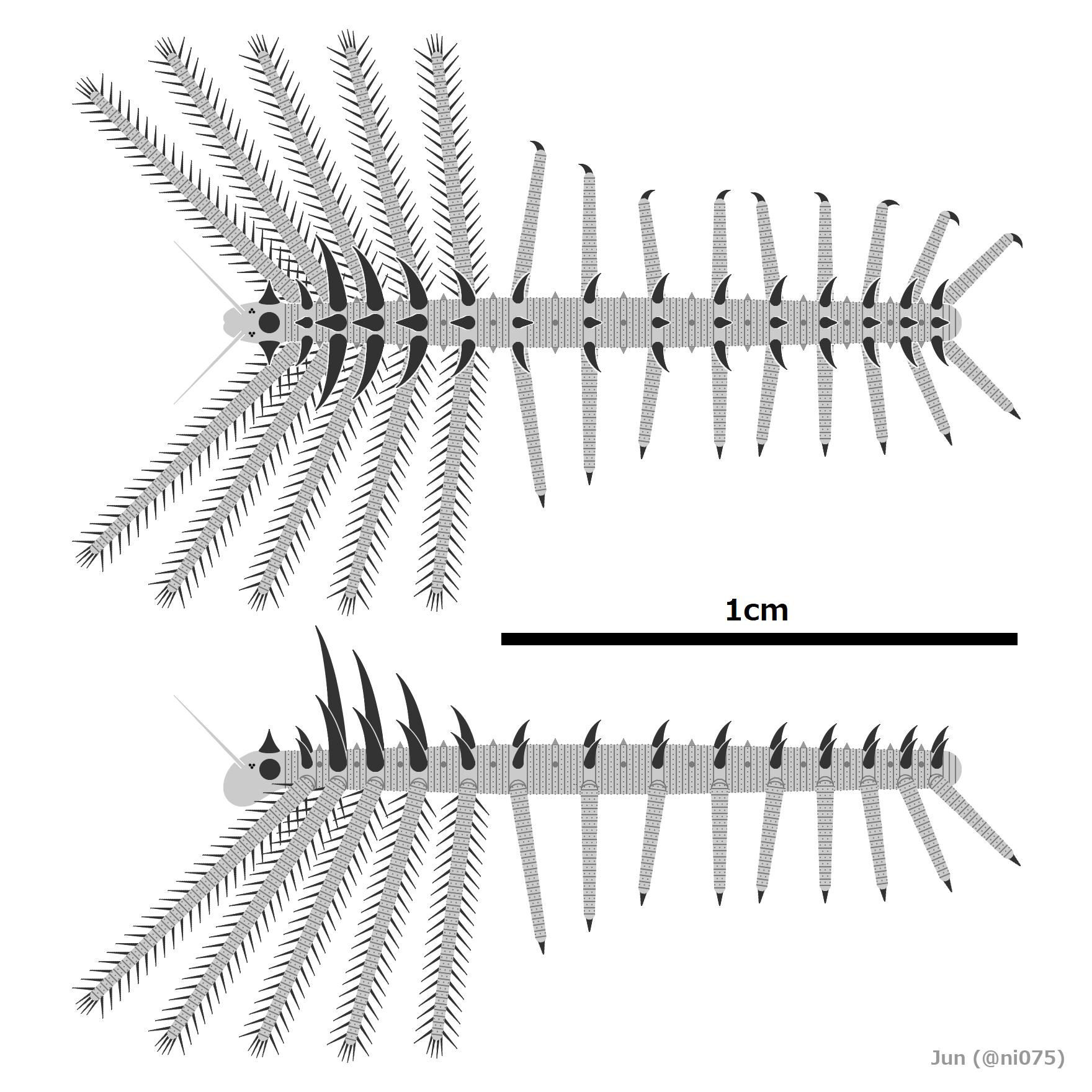
Diagrammatic reconstruction of Luolishania longicruris, based on the interpretation of Miraluolishania haikouensis as the same species.

A single specimen of Luolishania fossil was discovered by Hou Xian-guang and Chen Jun-yuan of the Nanjing Institute of Geology and Palaeontology, Chinese Academy of Sciences, from the Chengjiang Lagerstätte in China, and described it in 1989. The generic name refers to the Luolishan village in Chengjian area from where the fossil was collected.

In 2009, a team of palaeontologists at the Yunnan University, led by Xiaoya Ma reported the discovery of 42 other specimens from Haikou, which is 40 km from Chengjian. With the help of Swiss palaeontologist Jan Bergström, Ma and Hou came to the conclusion that all the specimens were Luolishania and that a closely related species, Miraluolishania haikouensis (described from the same area by Jianni Liu and Degan Shu in 2004) was also a species (junior synonym) of Luolishania. However, a reassessment by Liu and Shu's team at the Northwest University in 2008 established that Luolishania and Miraluolishania are distinct animals, an idea that was continuously defended by Liu & Dunlop 2014. However, inclusive phylogenetic analysis of lobopodians since the mid 2010 generally treat both of them as conspecific, coding Luolishania with characters believed to be those of Miraluolishania by Liu et al. (e.g. eyes, antennae, spines). Additionally, Miraluolishania had been noted as one of the ambiguous or controversial lobopodian species by Ou & Mayer 2018.

== Description ==
Luolishania is a tiny and slim soft-bodied lobopodian measuring about 0.7 cm long and about 0.9 mm wide. It bears 16 pairs of stubby legs (lobopods) which are attached to each 16 body segment (somite). The first five pairs are distinguishably longer and covered with spines. The spines are arranged in V-shaped pattern. It is discernible in all the legs, but the last four posterior pairs have four claws, and it is likely that all legs have the same number of claws. The legs are attached to the body at intervals of about 0.4 to 0.8 mm. Luolishania possesses three dot-like tubercles or sclerites on each somite. If the Miraluolishania specimens are indeed conspecific, the anterior rows of sclerites would have been long, curved spines. The area surrounding the sclerites are rusty in colour due to the presence of iron oxide (pyrite). The gut is straight and simple, running the entire length of the body. Morphological appendages and traces of anatomical parts indicate that it is a filter feeder.

The head is oval shaped, but in contrast to other luolishaniid species, it is relatively expanded relative to its body. A pair of tiny projections of about 2 mm long are present on the front-sides of the head and are presumed to be antennae. Luolishania is the first lobopodian discovered to have eyes, which were once reinterpreted as sclerites. Scanning electron microscopic study confirmed that there is a pair of eyes towards the middle area of the head. At the base of the head is a distinct constriction like a neck that is a connection to the main body (trunk).

== Classification ==
Below is an internal phylogeny of Luolishaniida after Knecht et al. 2025:

- Luolishaniida
  - - †Ovatiovermis
    - †Facivermis
  - - †Luolishania
    - †Collinsovermidae
      - †EBS Collinsovermid (SAM P14848)
      - - †Acinocricus
        - - †Collinsovermis
          - - †Collinsium
            - †Entothyreos
