= Tertiapatus =

Tertiapatus Temporal range: Eocene–Miocene

Scientific classification
- Kingdom: Animalia
- Phylum: Onychophora
- Family: †Tertiapatidae; Poinar, 2000
- Genus: †Tertiapatus; Poinar, 2000
- Species: †T. dominicanus

Binomial name
- †Tertiapatus dominicanus Poinar, 2000

Controversial Miocene-aged genus of dubious velvet worm

Tertiapatus is an extinct genus of supposed onychophoran known from Eocene to Miocene-aged Dominican amber deposits. The only species is Tertiapatus dominicanus, and the animal is known from only a single fossil. Tertiapatus was originally described as an onychophoran with dermal papillae, a pair of annulated antennae, a pair of small eyes (with one at the base of each antennae), stubby legs without claws or terminal feet, and slime papillae with adjacent pools of onychophoran slime.

Other authors have doubted its status as an onchyophoran due to its arthropodized (segmented) antennae and articulated exoskeleton, which suggests that it is likely an arthropod. Its lack of claws has also come into question, as fossils of other velvet worms (Cretoperipatus) show these can be easily dislocated.

== Discovery and naming ==
Tertiapatus was first mentioned in a 1996 by George Poinar Jr. Four years later, the animal was formerly described. Tertiapatus was found in Eocene to Miocene Dominican amber dating between roughly 15 to 45 million years ago. While originating from the Dominican Republic, the location it was found remains unknown.

Tertiapatus is represented by a single fossil deposited at the Poinar Amber Collection of Oregon State University in Corvallis, Oregon under the ascension number ON-1-2. The etymology of the animal's species or genus name was not provided in its description.

== Description ==
Tertiapatus was a terrestrial animal, with the basic structure of its head, body, and slime papillae closely resembling those of modern velvet worms. The holotype is only partially complete, with front of its body bent back on itself, likely concealing a ventral mouth. Tertiapatus preserved a reddish-brown color, with traces of pigment seeping into the amber matrix. Organic compounds like alcohols and terpenes occur in tree resin (the precursor to amber) and are capable of dissolving certain pigments. Given the diffusion, the original description considered its pigment to be insoluble in organic solvents. A similar condition is found in the modern family Peripatidae. Similar to living velvet worms, Tertiapatus preserved dermal papillae on various parts of its body. These were numerous and prominent along the animal's back, but less so on the head and legs. Sizes of the papillae ranged from being 25 to 38 µm long and 8 to 13 µm wide.

=== Head ===
Tertiapatus had a single pair of antenna. In the holotype, these are 459 and 460 µm long and have a greatest width of 100 µm. The antennae preserved annulations (rings) like seen in living velvet worms, though they lacked any of the characteristic dermal papillae/tubercles. Near the base of the antennae were two small eye spots, with one at each base. Beneath the antenna and by the sides of the head were a pair of slime papillae. In the holotype, the slime papillae were extended, being 175 and 180 µm long and 80 µm thick at their widest point. The slime papillae were shorter than the animal's legs, and unlike the antennae, were covered with scattered dermal papillae. On either side of the head, there was a deposit of slime, likely shot before the animal died.

=== Trunk and lobopods ===
The Tertiapatus holotype was 4.38 mm long and preserved 19 pairs of lobopods (legs). Lobopods ranged from being 210 µm to 260 µm long and 120 µm to 200 µm wide. As mentioned before, the body is incomplete, with more than half of the fossil missing. Based on a length-to-width comparison with living velvet worms, Tertiapatus is estimated to have between 36 and 40 pairs of legs, substantially more than preserved. In addition, Tertiapatus's trunk preserved numerous, closely-spaced dermal papillae. However, only faint annulations were present.

When first mentioned in 1996, the Tertiapatus was stated to have claws. In contrast, Tertiapatus's 2000 description described it as having simple legs that lacked distinct claws or a terminal foot (with what were once claws now considered fractures in the amber matrix). The reasoning behind this was that the claws were not present on all legs, and even when they were, the positioning was not consistent.

== Classification ==
=== Original classification ===
When first described by Poinar, Tertiapatus was classified using a now-outdated definition of Onychophora that included various Paleozoic lobopodians. This classification is now obsolete, as modern phylogenies label this grouping "total-group Onychophora" which lacks many of the traditional members or do not recover it at all.

In its original description, Tertiapatus was placed in a variety of newly created taxa. The first of these was a class named Udeonychophora that contained terrestrial onychophorans with a ventral (bottom-facing) mouth. The class was divided into two orders, Euonychophora and Ontonychophora. Tertiapatus was placed in newly-created Ontonychophora, a group defined by their simple lobopods (no annulations of dermal papillae), variability in having claws, and the lack of a specialized terminal foot. Ontonychophora also included Helenodora (put in the new family Helenodoridae) and the co-described Succinipatopsis. Ontonychophora was further subdivided into the superfamily Tertiapatoidea, defined by a lack of claws and spinous cushions. This clade included Tertiapatus and Succinipatopsis, both placed in their own monotypic families (Tertiapatidae and Succinipatopsidae).

- Onychophora
  - Xenusia
    Paleozoic Lobopodians
  - Udeonychophora
    - Euonychophora (modern velvet worms)
      - Peripatidae
      - Peripatopsidae
    - Ontonychophora
      - Tertiapatoidea
        - Tertiapatidae
          Tertiapatus
        - Succinipatopsidae
          Succinipatopsis
      - Helenodoroidea
        - Helenodoridae
          Helenodora

Outdated classification of Onychophora based on Poinar (2000).

=== Later critiques ===
==== Grimaldi et al. (2002) ====
After its original description, Tertiapatus's anatomy and classification quickly came into question. In a 2002 paper, Grimaldi et al. contended the animal's placement in a new family and order. They stated that the vast majority of Dominican amber fossils came from modern families, and despite being older, a fossil they described (Cretoperipatus) belonged to the modern family Peripatidae. Because of this, Grimaldi et al. argued that Tertiapatus belonging to an extinct clade was highly unlikely, especially since it existed so recently.

Furthermore, the paper claimed that Tertiapatus's lack of feet or claws might be an artifact of preservation. Onychophorans are capable of retracting their feet, and when preserved in ethanol, most specimens will have only the claws protruding. Based on these points, the paper synonymized Udeonychophora and Ontonychophora with Euonychophora, lumping Succinipatopsis, Tertiapatus, and Helenodora with the extant onychophorans.

==== Garwood et al. (2016) ====
With the description of Antennipatus by Garwood et al., the authors rejected Tertiapatus as being an onychophoran. From their perspective, the fossil was found to have segmented antennae and an articulated exoskeleton grouped into tergites. With this in mind, the Tertiapatus would probably be an arthropod.

==== Oliveira et al. (2016) ====
Later in the same year, Oliveira et al. instead considered Tertiapatus an onychophoran. While studying new fossils of Cretoperipatus, Oliveira et al. found that onychophoran claws would often detach. These would disperse throughout the amber, sometimes very far away. Because of how frequent this was, the authors reasoned that Tertiapatus may have had claws, but that these were either trimmed away or left unnoticed. Ultimately, the study concluded that this animal should be further analyzed and reclassified in the future.

== Paleoenvironment ==
Tertiapatus was found in Dominican amber, a tree resin formed from the sap of Hymenaea protera, a type of legume tree that has since gone extinct. Tertiapatus lived with numerous arthropods. Species represented include ants, aphids, beetles, bat flies and bees. Other invertebrates like the tardigrade Paradoryphoribius chronocaribbeus and nematode Formicodiplogaster myrmenema were also present. While invertebrates make up the majority of inclusions, Tertiapatus shared also shared its environment with vertebrates like Nesoctites micromegas (a bird), Palaeoplethodon hispaniolae (a salamander), and Sphaerodactylus (a type of gecko).
