= Succinipatopsis =

Succinipatopsis Temporal range: Eocene

Scientific classification
- Kingdom: Animalia
- Phylum: Onychophora
- Family: †Succinipatopsidae; Poinar, 2000
- Genus: †Succinipatopsis; Poinar, 2000
- Species: †S. balticus

Binomial name
- †Succinipatopsis balticus Poinar, 2000

Controversial Eocene-aged genus of dubious velvet worm

Succinipatopsis is an extinct genus of animal from Eocene-aged Baltic amber. This animal is known from a single fossil that preserves a body with 10 pairs of stubby appendages, with a hole between the third pair. Due to its poor preservation, the placement of Succinipatopsis is contested, as there are multiple interpretations of its anatomy. Some researchers consider it an onychophoran (velvet worm) that lost its claws when fossilized. Others reject this affinity due to differences between its cuticle and its apparent lack of onychophoran-specific traits. Its lack of claws has also come into question, as fossils of other velvet worms (Cretoperipatus) show these can be easily dislocated.

== Discovery and naming ==
Succinipatopsis was first mentioned in a 1996 paper by George Poinar Jr., who formally described it four years later. Succinipatopsis was found in Eocene-aged Baltic amber which dates to roughly 40 million years ago. Its location or even country of origin is unknown.

Succinipatopsis is known from a single fossil that is deposited at the Poinar Amber Collection of Oregon State University in Corvallis, Oregon under the ascension number ON-1-1. The etymology of the animal's species or genus name was not provided in its description.

== Description ==
The Succinipatopsis holotype is encased in amber and had at least 10 appendages, with the rest being cut off. Visually, the animal was poorly preserved. Its body is covered with a fine deposit and surrounded by small cracks in the amber matrix. This made examining its external appearance difficult, and it is unclear whether Succinipatopsis had annulations (rings of dermal papillae) along its trunk or appendages. While some cracks looked like spines jutting out from the body, these were probably artifacts of preservation as their placement is irregular.

The holotype had a purplish-black or black tint with no traces its color diffusing into the amber matrix. Organic compounds like alcohols and terpenes occur in tree resin (the precursor to amber) and are capable of dissolving certain pigments. Since the animal's color did not diffuse, the original description considered its pigment to be insoluble in organic solvents.

In the original description, the fossil was interpreted as the anterior (front) part of the animal, for two reasons. First, the underside had a roughly triangular opening between the third pair of visible appendages. This was interpreted as a mouth, as modern velvet worms have a mouth between their second and third segments. Second, in living velvet worms, the anus is located at either the very end of the body or between the last pair of legs. Using the framework above, the first pair of appendages were interpreted as antennae. The second pair of appendages were shorter than the antennae but longer than the rest. Because of their position on the animal, these were interpreted as slime papillae. The remaining appendages were interpreted as legs known as lobopods. These lobopods were described as simple and lacked the distinct foot, claw, and spinous pads typical of modern velvet worms. Based on a length-to-width comparison with extant onychophorans, Succinipatopsis is estimated to have 18–20 pairs of legs. The animal was also said to have large epidermal cells without protrusions.

== Classification ==
=== Original classification ===
When first described by Poinar, Succinipatopsis was classified using a now-outdated definition of Onychophora that included various Paleozoic lobopodians. This classification is now obsolete, as modern phylogenies label this grouping "total-group Onychophora" which lacks many of the traditional members or do not recover it at all.

In its original description, Succinipatopsis was placed in a variety of newly created taxa. The first of these was a class named Udeonychophora that contained terrestrial onychophorans with a ventral (bottom-facing) mouth. The class was divided into two orders, Euonychophora and Ontonychophora. Succinipatopsis was placed in the newly-defined Ontonychophora, a group defined by their simple lobopods (no annulations of dermal papillae), variability in having claws, and the lack of a specialized terminal foot. Ontonychophora also included Helenodora (put in the new family Helenodoridae) and the co-described Tertiapatus. Ontonychophora was further subdivided into the superfamily Tertiapatoidea, defined by a lack of claws and spinous cushions. This clade included Succinipatopsis and Tertiapatus, both placed in their own monotypic families (Succinipatopsidae and Tertiapatidae).

- Onychophora
  - Xenusia
    Paleozoic Lobopodians
  - Udeonychophora
    - Euonychophora (modern velvet worms)
      - Peripatidae
      - Peripatopsidae
    - Ontonychophora
      - Tertiapatoidea
        - Tertiapatidae
          Tertiapatus
        - Succinipatopsidae
          Succinipatopsis
      - Helenodoroidea
        - Helenodoridae
          Helenodora

Outdated classification of Onychophora based on Poinar (2000).

=== Later critiques ===
==== Grimaldi et al. (2002) ====
Soon after its original description, Succinipatopsis's anatomy and classification came into question. In a 2002 paper, Grimaldi et al. contended the animal's placement in a new family and order, and stated that the vast majority of Baltic amber fossils came from modern families, and despite being older, a fossil it described (Cretoperipatus) belonged to the modern family Peripatidae. Because of this, they argued that Succinipatopsis belonging to an extinct clade was highly improbable, especially since it existed so recently.

The paper also claimed that Succinipatopsis's lack of feet or claws was probably an artifact of preservation. Onychophorans are known to retract their feet, and most specimens preserved in ethanol have their feet retracted with only the claws protruding. Based on these points, the paper synonymized Udeonychophora and Ontonychophora with Euonychophora, lumping Succinipatopsis, Tertiapatus, and Helenodora with the extant onychophorans.

==== Garwood et al. (2016) ====
Disputes about Succinipatopsis's classification reemerged more than a decade later in 2016. In a study by Garwood et al. describing Antennipatus, the authors questioned if Succinipatopsis was an onychophoran in the first place. To justify this, the paper cited how the animal had fine projections on its skin which differed from the onychophoran cuticle and lacked any traits specific to the group.

==== Oliveira et al. and Murdock et al. (both 2016) ====
Later in the same year, Oliveira et al. disagreed with Garwood et al. and instead considered Succinipatopsis an onychophoran. This paper focused on Cretoperipatus and the insights gained from redescribing it. While studying new fossils, the authors noticed that claws often detached from the animal's foot and could disperse throughout the amber, sometimes very far away. Because of how frequent this was, the authors reasoned that Succinipatopsis may have had claws, but that these were either trimmed away or left unnoticed. Ultimately, the study concluded that this animal should be reclassified in the future.

Likewise, in a study by Murdock et al. redescribing the controversial Helenodora, Succinipatopsis was regarded as an "unequivocal terrestrial onychophoran" known from Eocene amber.

== Paleoenvironment ==
Succinipatopsis was found in Baltic amber, a tree resin produced by vast forests of closely related trees, maybe even a single species. Based on the amber's absorption spectra, it was likely produced by conifers in the family Sciadopityaceae, the only extant member being the kōyamaki tree (Sciadopitys verticillata). Succinipatopsis lived along a wide variety of arthropods including numerous beetles, as well as rarer groups such as spiders and pseudoscorpions. While arthropods make up the majority of inclusions, the animal also lived with vertebrates such as the lizard Succinilacerta succinea.
