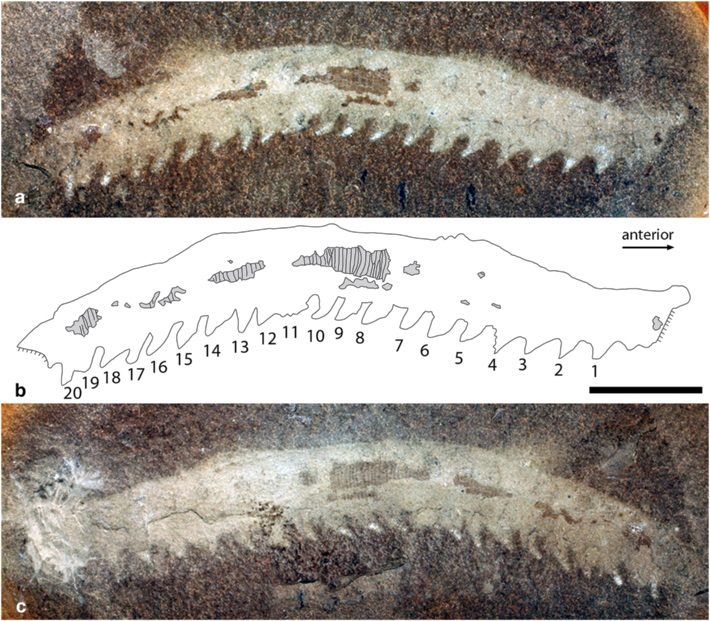
- Helenodora holotype FMNH PE 29049

Scientific classification
- Kingdom: Animalia
- Stem group: Onychophora
- Genus: †Helenodora; Thompson and Jones, 1980
- Species: †H. inopinata

Binomial name
- †Helenodora inopinata Thompson and Jones, 1980

= Helenodora =

Helenodora Temporal range: Pennsylvanian ~311–307 Ma

Controversial genus of Carboniferous-aged velvet worm or lobopodian

Helenodora is an extinct basal onychophoran or lobopodian genus known from the Carboniferous Carbondale Formation of Illinois. The only known species described is H. inopinata. The ecology of this animal is not well known, but it is thought that it may have lived on land and/or underwater.

== Discovery and naming ==
At the moment, Helenodora is known from ten specimens found in the Middle Pennsylvanian, Francis Creek Shale of Illinois. All were found in siderite concretions from Mazon Creek fossil beds, a lagerstätte that contains animals like the famous "Tully Monster".

The first specimens found (the holotype FMNH PE 29049 and paratype FMNH PE 29050) were described during the 80's and are composed of both a part and counterpart. These were deposited in the invertebrate fossil collection of the Field Museum of Natural History of Chicago, Illinois. Other specimens include FMNH PE 13966, 33380, 33822, 45049, and 49784 and FMNH ROM 47513, 45565, and 47978.

Helenodora was suggested by some authors to be a junior synonym of Ilyodes Scudder 1890, a fossil genus that includes two species and was originally described as a myriapod. A re-examination of the type material of Helenodora inopinata and the Ilyodes species found significant differences between them. Additionally, neither species of Ilyodes were adequately diagnosed, so they and the genus are all considered nomina dubia.

The genus name "Helenodora" is Greek for "Helen’s gift". This name honors Mrs. Helen Piecko of Chicago, Illinois for finding both the holotype and paratype. The species name "inopinata" is Latin and means "unexpected".

== Description ==
=== Antennae ===
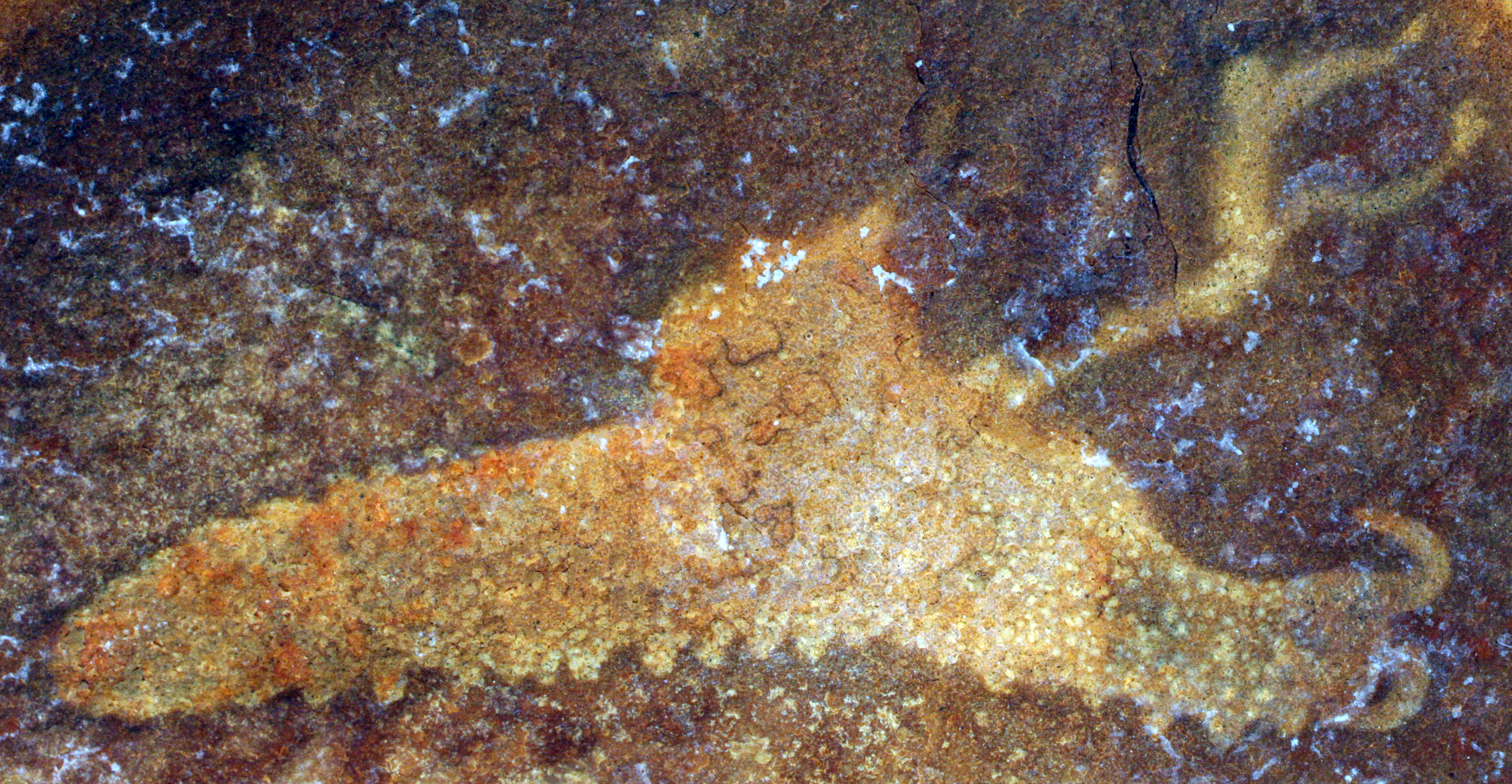
FMNH PE13966 specimen from Murdock et al. showing noticeable antennae

In its initial description, Thomson and Jones were unsure about Helenodora's overall orientation. However, because one region tapered more than the other, contained a small dark patch (originally interpreted as jaws), and had appendages more reminiscent of antenna, it was tentatively labeled as the front. Later research confirmed this hypothesis, with multiple specimens possessing well-defined antennae on the more tapered region of their body. In newer specimens, the antenna are most notable in FMNH PE13966 (both the part and counterpart) but are also present in ROM 47978. In FMNH PE13966 where the antennae are complete, the appendages are 4-5 mm long and 1.2 mm wide at base.

=== Potential jaws ===
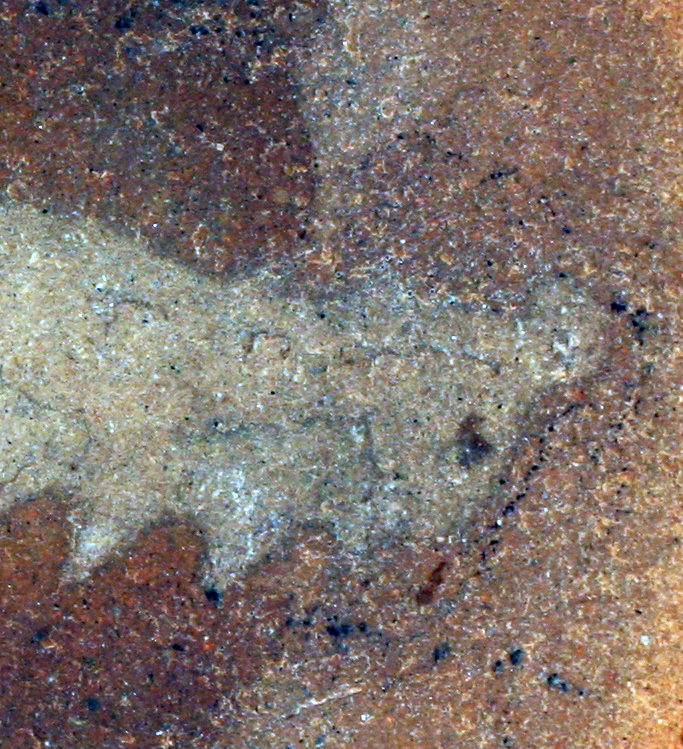
Holotype specimen showing a dark hook-like patch originally viewed as a jaw

When first described, researchers noticed both the Helenodora holotype and paratype preserved a small dark patch at their front ends. These were assumed to be jaws since they were found in roughly the same position as those in modern onychophorans. The patch in the holotype was noted to have some lobe-like relief, while the one in the paratype was smaller and pyritized.

Later research disputed this interpretation. In their reanalysis of the holotype, Murdock et al. found that despite what was originally claimed, the holotype patch was flat and showed no relief. They also found that it was chemically indistinguishable from other dark patches, only composed of siderite and some framboidal pyrite. Notably, this patch lacked any traces of a carbon film, something expected of preserved jaws.

A similar thing was found with the paratype’s jaw patch. Matching the original description, the paratype patch was composed of pyrite and had an indistinct shape. However, like the holotype patch, it was indistinguishable from other patches found on the fossil or outside its margins. Additionally, the paratype patch was found to exist between the second and third pairs of appendages. This is behind where the jaws are found in modern onychophorans. Combined with the lack of jaw patches in other specimens (including ones with a complete front), Murdock concluded Helenodora lacked jaws altogether.

=== Potential slime papillae ===
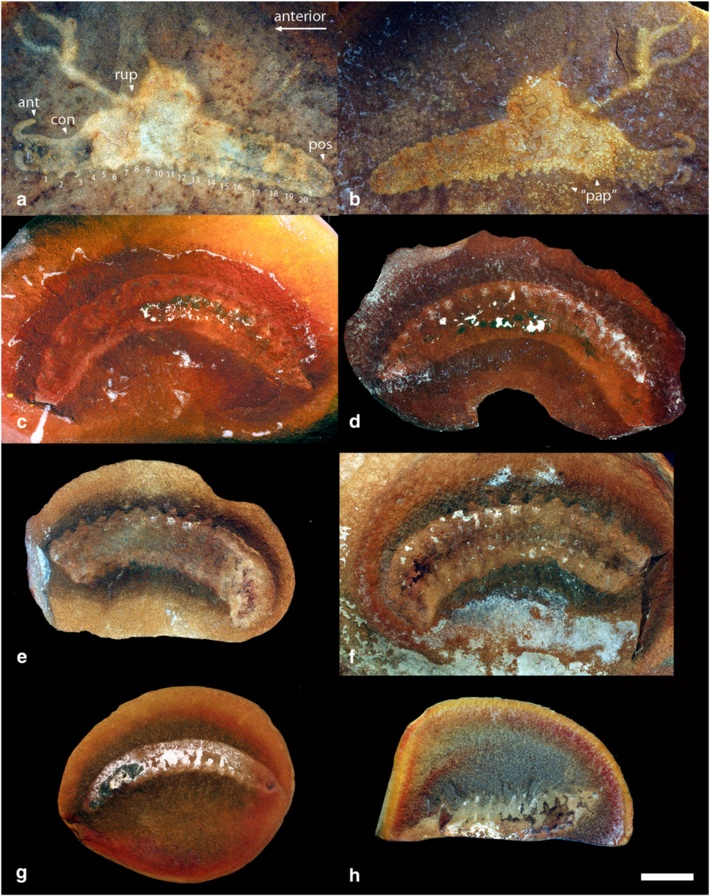
Helenodora specimens FMNH PE13966 (A and B), FMNH 33380 (C and D), FMNH PE33822 (E and F), FMNH PE45049 (g), and FMNH PE49784 (h)

Back in 1980, Thomson and Jones tentatively described Helenodora as having "oral papilla" (slime papilla), though they were not completely sure of this due to poor preservation in both the holotype and paratype. Using Phallocephale for comparison, a 2012 study found the Helenodora specimen ROM 47978 had paired lateral extensions resembling retracted slime papillae. Though, like the study before them, these were labeled as putative.

Things changed in 2016 when Murdock et al. interpreted Helenodora to lack slime papilla all together. In the specimens analyzed, they found no consistent evidence that the 2nd appendage was differentiated from ones behind it, or that the animal had signs of slime papilla. As the bulge in ROM 47978 wasn't present in other specimens with a complete head, it was likely a product of decay.

=== Trunk ===
Helenodora had a long trunk (body) with multiple annulations (rings of skin) on its cuticle. Around 9 of these were present on each segment, though they were sometimes obscured by the animal's legs. In complete or near complete specimens, the trunk ranged in length from 45 to 66 millimeters long and 6 to 13 millimeters wide. Additionally, it had a short rounded extension that continued past the last leg pair.

Helenodora was originally described as having dermal papillae, though later authors were more uncertain. When structures resembling them were preserved, they weren't always arranged in rows, and in certain specimens (FMNH PE13966), they could be found outside of annulations or even the body outline. Helenodora possessing dermal papillae wasn't fully rejected, but they were removed as a diagnostic feature of the animal.

=== Lobopods ===
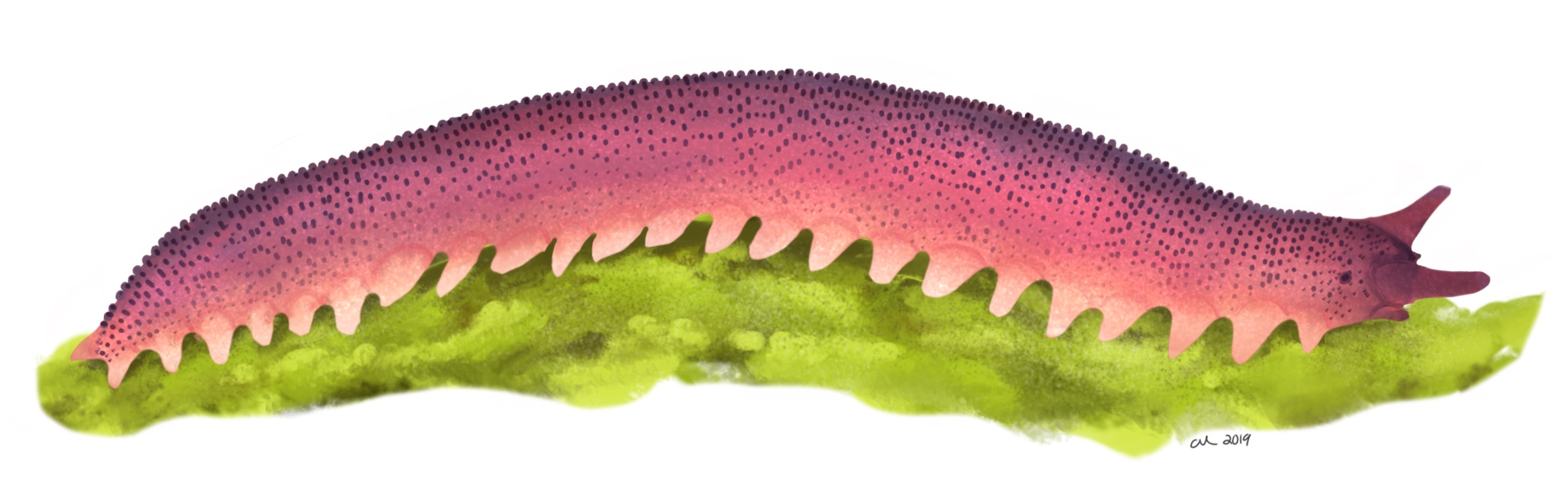
Outdated artist's reconstruction of Helenodora inopinata.

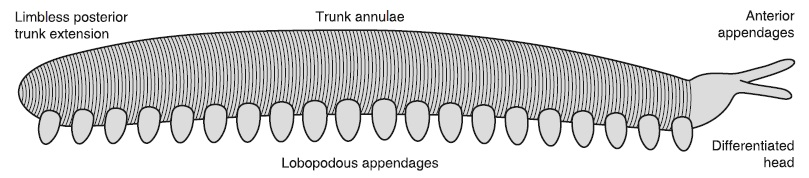
Anatomical reconstruction by Murdock et al. based on newer fossil material

While originally thought to have more or less, Helenodora is now known to possess 20 pairs of legs known as lobopods. In complete specimens with a differentiated front and back, this number is certain. These lobopods are preserved as stubby triangles that taper off towards the end. They had a mean length of 1.7 millimeters, and a mean width at their base of 2.1 millimeters. Other than a single leg on the paratype (appendage 11), none of Helenodora’s lobopods preserve any part of the cuticle. However, even where it exists, the cuticle is poorly preserved. Because of this, whether the lobopods had any annulations or limb ornaments is unknown.

=== Potential claws ===
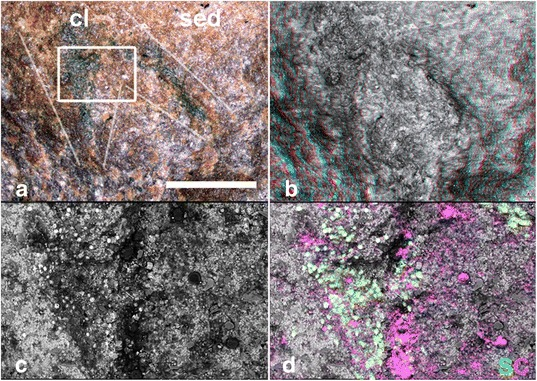
Potential claws on the Helenodora paratype (FMNH PE 29050)

When first described by Thomson and Jones, the paratype (FMNH PE 29050) was interpreted to preserve seven pairs of claws on the tips of its lobopods. One of these was well-defined, while the rest less so. The claws were preserved as small, long dark patches composed of a thin film of carbon and framboidal pyrite. All were on the left row of the body and found on either side of the fossil concretion.

However, a 2016 redescription by Murdock et al. argued that Helenodora’s claws were a taphonomic artifact. In this study, claw-like patches were found throughout the paratype as well as in multiple newer specimens. These were found in areas inconsistent with claws, sometimes outside the fossil boundary. Based on this information, the claws on the paratype were likely a coincidence, causing Murdock to conclude that the animal lacked them in life. This was further supported by taphonomic evidence, as in modern velvet worms, claws are composed of sclerotized (hardened) chitin and are a highly decay-resistant feature.

Barely a year later, Helenodora’s lack of claws was contested in a study by Grimaldi et al. This paper redescribed Cretoperipatus, a velvet worm preserved in amber, based on three new specimens. The authors found that in one specimen, many of the claws had detached and were dispersed throughout the amber matrix. In modern velvet worms, the foot begins decaying soon after death. Because the claws are only connected by a fragile membrane of tissue, decay might cause them to detach. This can reach the point where the animal lacks feet and claws altogether. With this in mind, the small dark patches in Helenodora could be claws that separated before or during fossilization.

== Classification ==
=== Thompson and Jones (1980) ===
When originally classified back in 1980, Helenodora was placed into the phylum Uniramia (a now obsolete group) and tentatively labeled as an onychophoran. Thompson and Jones were somewhat unsure of this due to poor preservation of the animal's head. It unclear weather Helenodora had antennae, jaws, and slime papillae (which back then were called oral papillae). While the Helenodora was reconstructed as an onychophoran, the authors acknowledged it may have differed.

=== Rolfe et al. (1982) ===
The following paper synonymized Helenodora with Ilyodes, considering both to be onychophorans. Their reasoning for synonymizing the taxa was never explained and was essentially done for no reason. Additionally, the study mentioned onychophoran fossils from France which they considered virtually identical to the animal.

=== Hou and Bergström (1995) ===
- review of fossil lobopodians
- lobopodia was defined as a phylum back then
- authors split it into two classes, xenusia (marine, very diverse) and terrestrial onychopphora (terrestrial)
- plausible phylogeny given that completely ignored this (onycophora is within xenusia)
- right next to this is order paraonychophora?
- did people not care about monophyly back then?
- treated as a terrestrial onychophoran with definite pair of antennae, jaws, and slime papillae
- some group by Rolfe et al. thought Helenodora and Ilyodes, were the same thing, the authors on this paper disagreed with that due to the differences in body length and leg structure (long narrow body with thin segmented legs vs shorter body with thick and stubby annulated lobopods)

=== Poinar (2000) ===
With the discovery of Tertiapatus and Succinipatopsis, Helenodora was placed in a variety of new taxa to distinguish it from living velvet worms. This was part of an effort by George Poinar Jr. to reconstruct onychophoran systematics. Helenodora was first placed in the class Udeonychophora, which was composed of terrestrial members with ventral (bottom-facing) mouth. The class was split into two orders: Euoncyhophora, and Ontonychophora. Of the two, Helenodora was placed in Ontonychophora, distinguished by their variable possession of claws and simple lobopods without rings of dermal papillae and a specialized terminal foot. The animal was then put in its own superfamily, Helenodoroidea (which had terminal claws) and given its own family, Helenodoridae. Under this classification, simple lobopods persisted in Helenodora, Tertiapatus, and Succinipatopsis, but developed a foot portion in the lineage that gave rise to modern onychophorans (Euonychophora).

- Onychophora
  - Xenusia
    Paleozoic Lobopodians
  - Udeonychophora
    - Euonychophora (modern velvet worms)
      - Peripatidae
      - Peripatopsidae
    - Ontonychophora
      - Tertiapatoidea
        - Tertiapatidae
          Tertiapatus
        - Succinipatopsidae
          Succinipatopsis
      - Helenodoroidea
        - Helenodoridae
          Helenodora

Outdated classification of Onychophora based on Poinar (2000).

=== Grimaldi et al. (2002) ===
In their description of Cretoperipatus, Grimaldi et al. viewed Helenodora's lack of feet and general lack of claws as an artifact of preservation. Onychophoran feet are retractile, and in ethanol-preserved specimens, the foot is typically hidden with only claws protruding. A given their apparent lack of feet or claws, a similar thing was said for Tertiapatus and Succinipatopsis. Following this reasoning, Udenonychophora and Ontonychophora became obsolete and were synonymized with Euonychophora.

=== Joachim et al. (2012) ===
- carbotubulus description
- two new speimens ROM 45565 and ROM 47978
- new head details (from ROM 47978)
- evidence of procerebral antennae, paired lat extensions resembling slime papillae (bulge on side of head)
- bulge similar to known SP found in Phallocephale, similar thing found in SEM pic of a Peripatid velvet worm
- annulated with numerous dermal papillae

=== Murdock et al. (2016) ===
A major revision of Helenodora's classification came in a 2016 redescription by Murdock et al. This study introduced a wealth of new fossils, and paired with a better understanding of the onychophoran decay process, the group now had grounds for a full reanalysis. Instead of an onychophoran or stem-onychophoran like Antennacanthopodia, Helenodora was reinterpreted as a basal lobopodian that lacked many of the features typical of velvet worms. While the presence of antennae was confirmed by FMNH PE13966, the animal was concluded to lack the hallmark jaws, claws, slime papillae, of velvet worms, with dermal papillae being potentially absent as well. The reasons behind this can be found in each trait's respective section.

- Panarthropoda "Lobopodia"
  - †Aysheaia
  - - - †Xenusion
      - †Diania
      - - †Onychodictyon
        - - - †Helenodora
            - †Paucipodia
          - - †Microdictyon
            - - †Cardiodictyon
              - - - †Hallucigenia hongmeia
                  - - †Acinocricus
                    - †EBS "Collins' monster" (SAM P14848)
                    - †BS "Collins' monster" (Collinsovermis)
                    - †Collinsium
                    - †Luolishania
                - - †Hallucigenia fortis
                  - †Hallucigenia sparsa
                  - - †Orstenotubulus
                    - - †Antennacanthopodia
                      - - †Tertiapatus
                        - - Ooperipatellus
                          - Plicatoperipatus
                          - Euperipatoides
    - - Total Group Arthropoda
      - Total Group Tardigrada

=== Garwood et al. (2016) ===
- antennipatus description
- onychophoran from france in the freshwater Montceau-les-Mines lagerstätte
- fossils found there originally attributed to helenodora
- description found it to be different
- unlike Helenodora which was now contested, antennipatus now oldest definite onychophoran
- found in freshwater environment
- had SP, at least semi-terrestrial
- distinguished from helenodora from different numbers of plicae (hel 9 ant 8), hel has shorter limb length, ant has annulated lobopods, DP confidently on antennae+trunk+lobopods

=== Oliveira et al. (2016) ===
In their description of Cretoperipatus, Oliveira et al. disagreed with Murdock et al.'s placement of Helenodora as a basal lobopodian, arguing that its anatomy was likely misinterpreted. They noted that the absence of feet and claws was likely caused by decay, as onychophoran feet start degrading almost immediately after death, and the claws are attached by only a fragile membrane, being easy to tear away. In Cretoperipatus, claws and even a jaw blade were found detached and floating around in amber, many outside the specimen boundary. This mirrored the small dark patches that were originally interpreted as claws and jaws, but were rejected due to inconsistent placement.

Oliveira's group also cautioned against the belief that Helenodora conclusively lacked slime papillae. Unlike with lobopods, slime papillae are incredibly retractile. Even when viewing an amber specimen with powerful imaging techniques, Oliveira and colleagues found it difficult to distinguish the slime papillae from the surrounding skin. Because of this, Oliveira et al. treated Helenodora's position as a basal lobopodian with caution.

=== Knecht et al. (2025) ===
In their description of Palaeocampa anthrax, an Aysheaiid lobopodian that lived alongside Helenodora, Knecht et al. found Helenodora to be an onychophoran in a polytomy with Antennipatus, Cretoperipatus, and various living velvet worms (from both Peripatidae and Peripatopsidae). In the Wikipedia cladogram, these are grouped as a single entity for simplicity, though the original cladogram lists 4. This finding was driven by a rejection of Murdock et al's interpretation and an agreement with Oliveira's concerns (eg: the animal possessed claws with many of them being detached).

- - †Diania
  - - †Lenisambulatrix
    - - - †Paucipodia
        - - †Thanahita
          - - †Eoconchariidae
              - †Microdictyon
              - †Fusuchoncharium
              - †Quadratapora
            - - - †Xenusion
                - †Onychodictyon
              - - †Strictocorniculum
                - †Rhombocorniculum
                - †Orstenotubulus
                - †Carbotubulus
                - †Hallucigenia fortis
                - †Hallucigenia sparsa
                - - †"Hallucigenia" hongmeia
                  - - †Cardiodictyon
                    - - Tardigrada (tardigrades)
                      - †Luolishaniida
                        - - †Ovatiovermis
                          - †Facivermis
                        - - †Luolishania
                          - †Collinsovermidae
                            - †EBS Collinsovermid (SAM P14848)
                            - - †Acinocricus
                              - - †Collinsovermis
                                - - †Collinsium
                                  - †Entothyreos
      - - †Aysheaiidae
          - †Aysheaia
          - - Soom Shale lobopodian (C1947)
            - - †Hadranax
              - †Palaeocampa
        - Antennopoda
          - - †Antennacanthopodia
            - Onychophora (velvet worms)
              - †Antennipatus
              - †Cretoperipatus
              - †Helenodora
              - Living onychophorans
          - - †Siberiidae
              - †Siberion
              - †Megadictyon
              - †Jianshanopodia
            - - - †Pambdelurion
                - †Kerygmachelidae
              - - †Opabiniidae
                - - †Radiodonta (e.g. Anomalocaris)
                  - Deuteropoda (modern arthropods)

== Paleobiology ==
1980 study

- Habitat of helenodora is unknown
- Mazon creek fossil beds had a mixed depositional environment (marine, freshwater, and terrestrial organisms)
- Pit 11 (where helenodora was found) contains mostly marine animals, though the occasional terrestrial animal can still be found (along with many land plants)
- Morphology of helenodra may show adaptations to terrestrial life, though this is only speculation
- Ex: shorter legs of helenodora and Peripatoides might be adaptations to terrestrial locomotion
- Ex: Reduced number of claws could reflect how terrestrial substrate is easier to grip than an aquatic one
- Ex: Slimmer body and legs could help better facilitate gas exchange

2016

- mixed dep environment
- pit 11 preseves benthic animals and many plants from land
- conservatively interprited as aquatic because of lack of dermal papillae and slime papillae
- could've been esturine

== Paleoenvironment ==
Helenodora lived alongside a wide variety of flora and fauna, including other lobopodians. Examples include Carbotubulus, a long-legged Hallucigeniid with a pair of small head appendages and four spots that resembled eyes, and Palaeocampa, an Aysheaiid lobopodian with venomous spines and a freshwater habitat.

1980 study

- Lived alongside the tully monster

== Gallery of fossils ==
Below are full-resolution images of various Helenodora fossils. For many of these, RGB values have been adjusted in certain parts of the fossil to better show anatomical details:

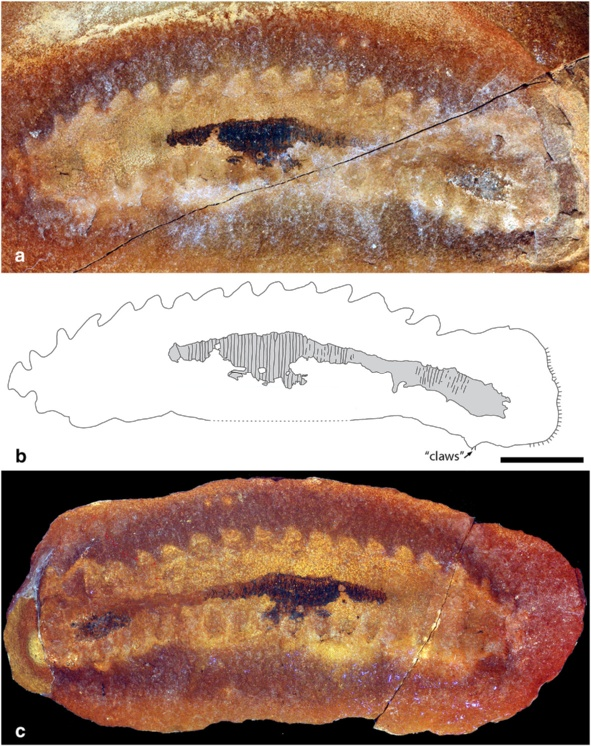
FMNH PE 29050 (paratype) part and counterpart

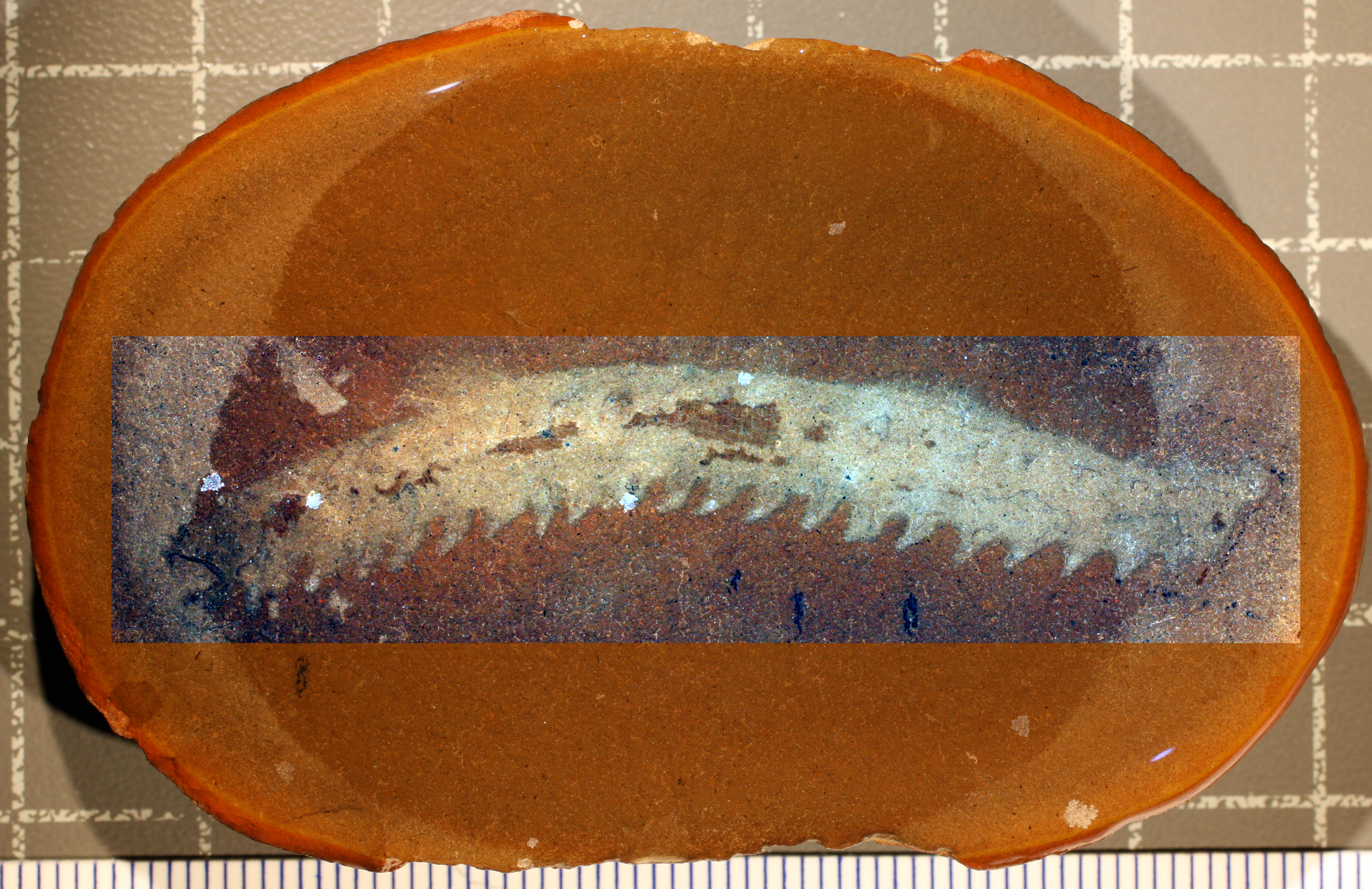
FMNH PE 29049 (holotype) part

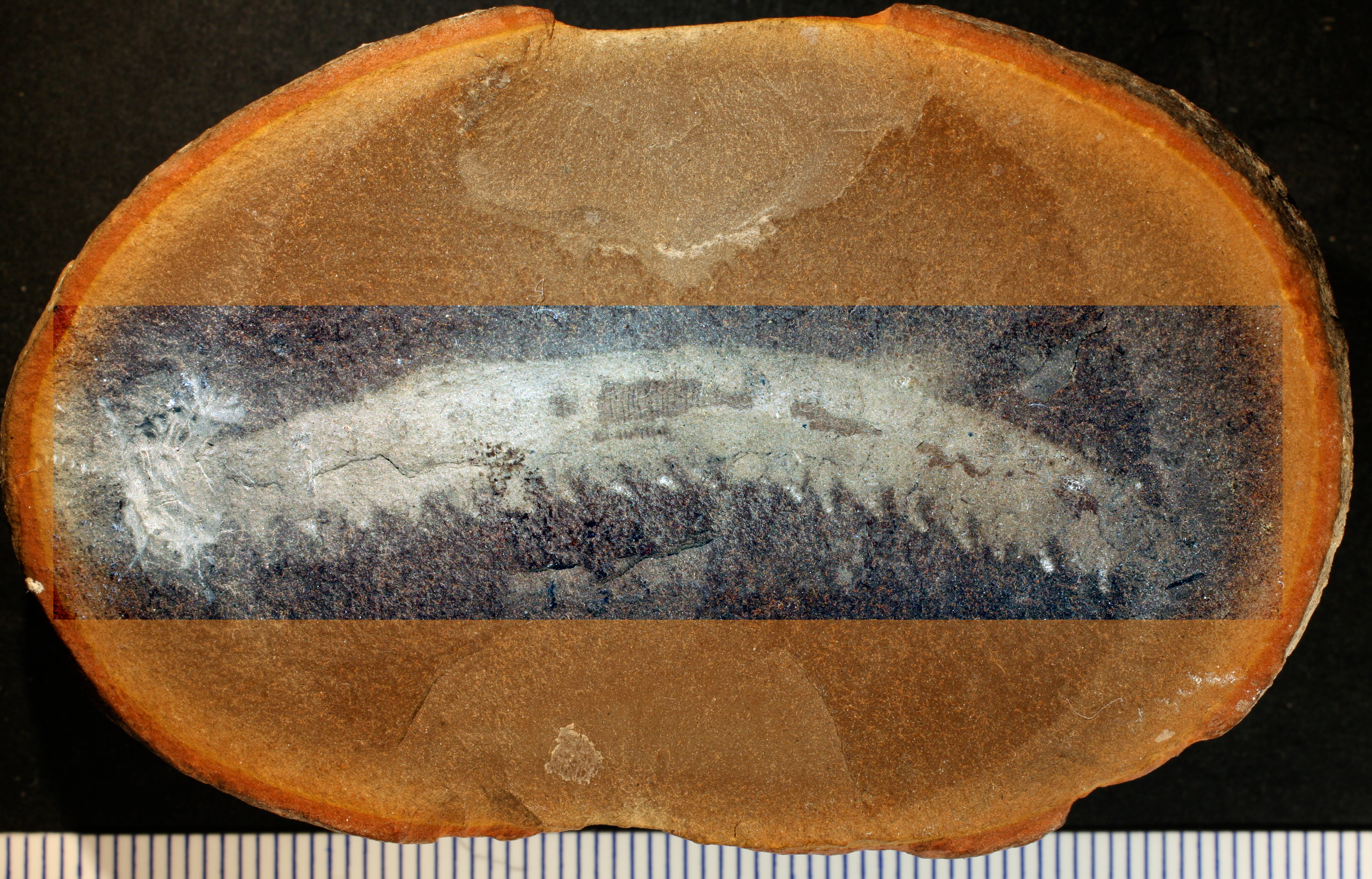
FMNH PE 29049 (holotype) counterpart

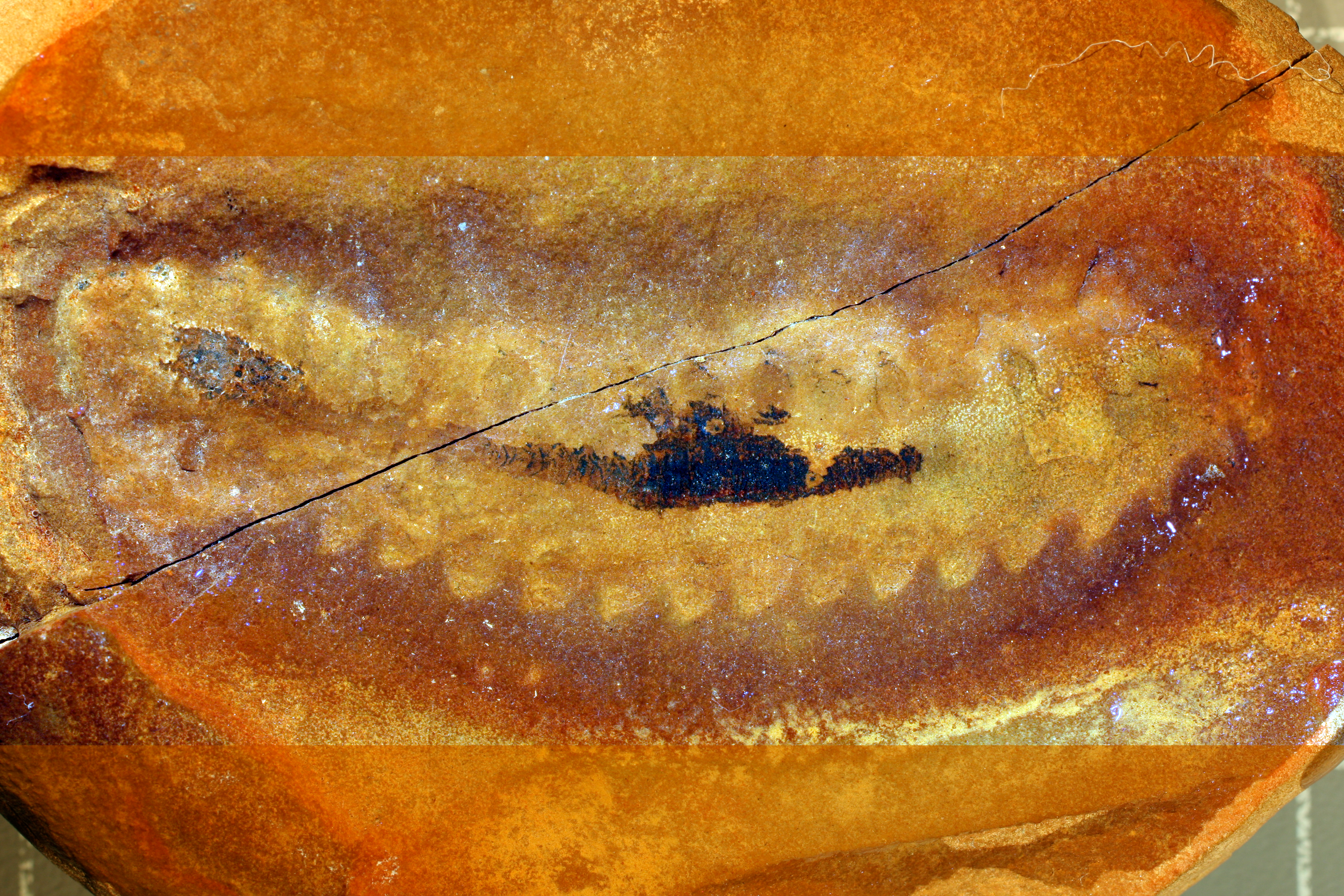
FMNH PE 29050 (paratype) part

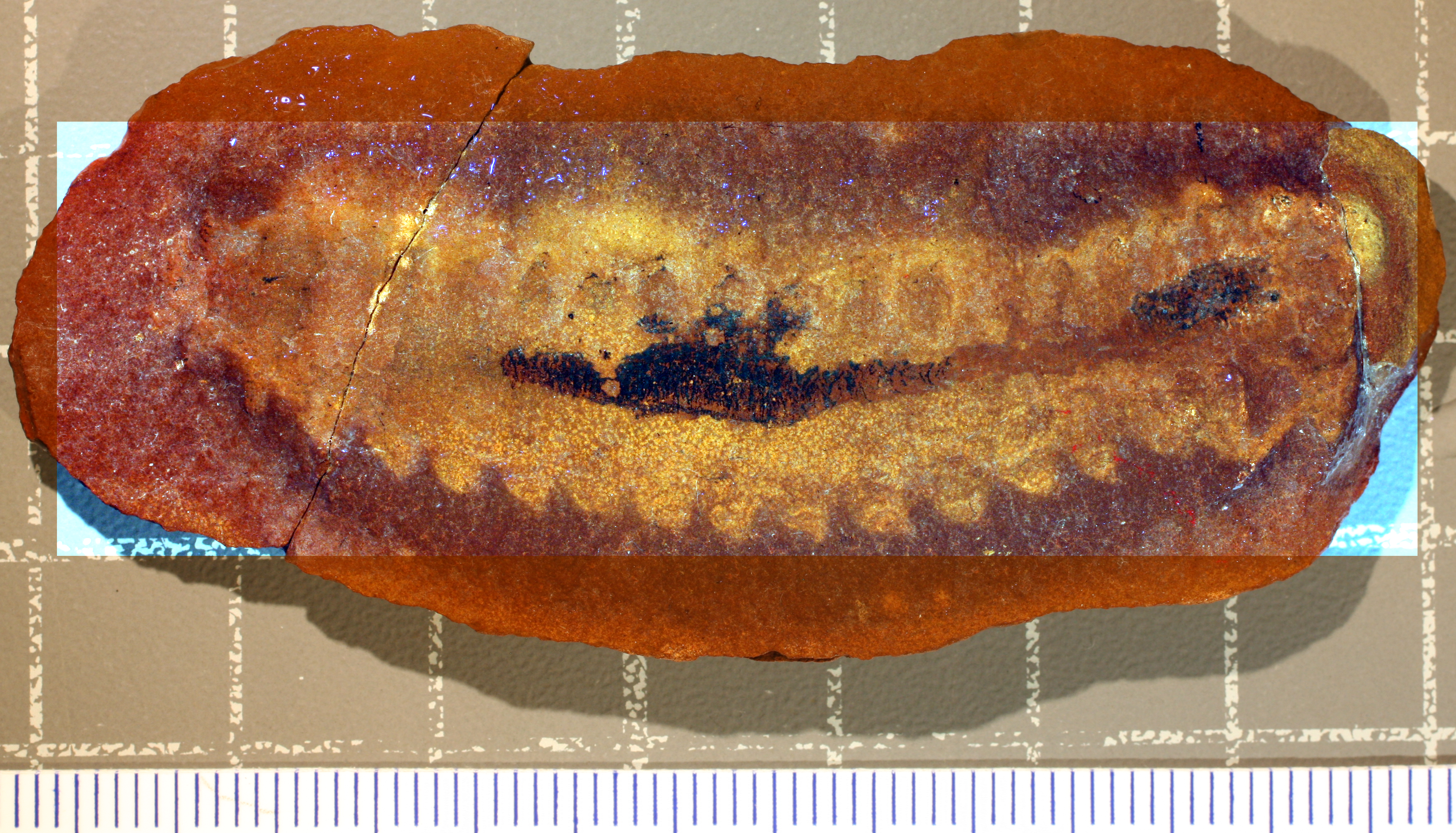
FMNH PE 29050 (paratype) counterpart

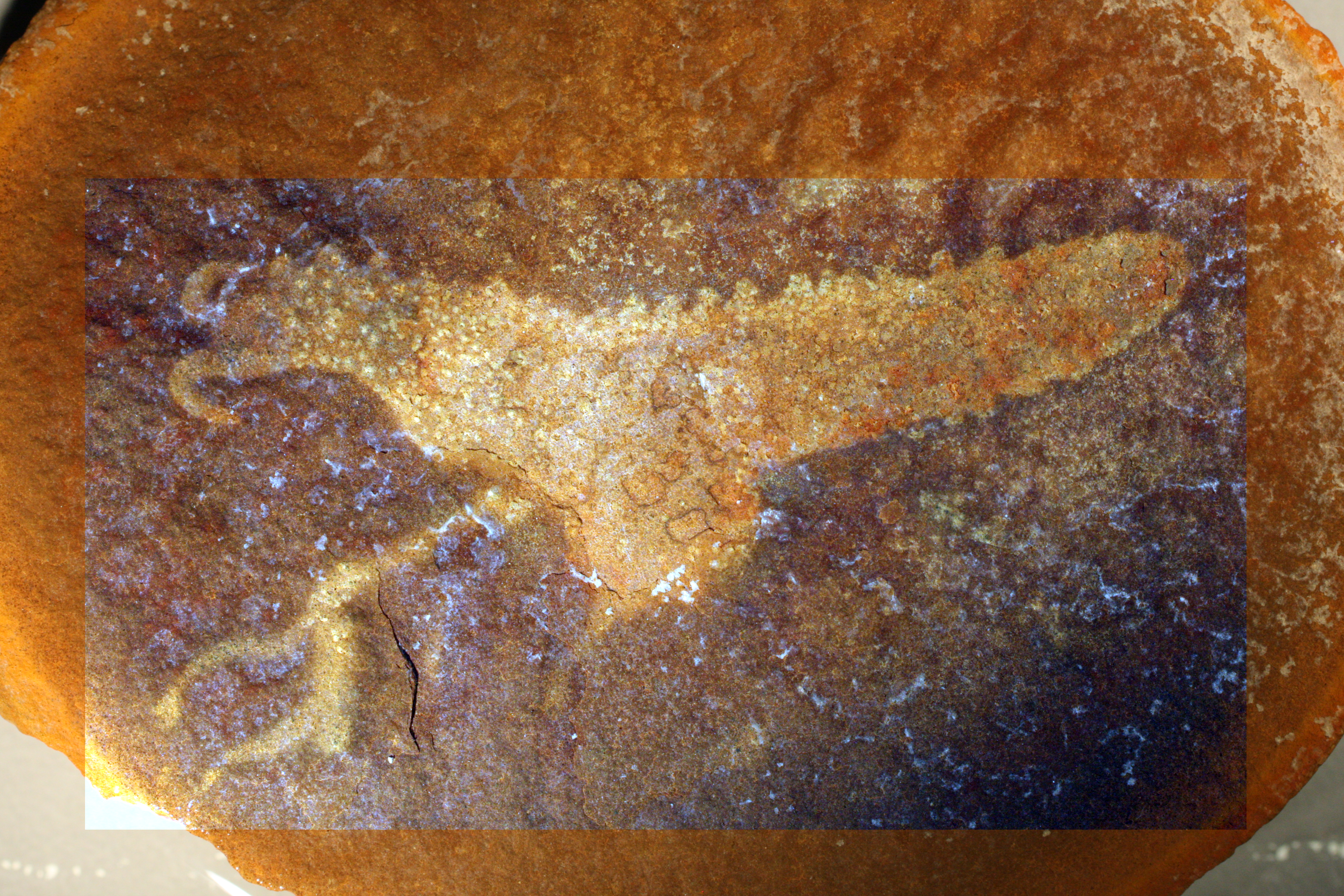
FMNH PE13966 part

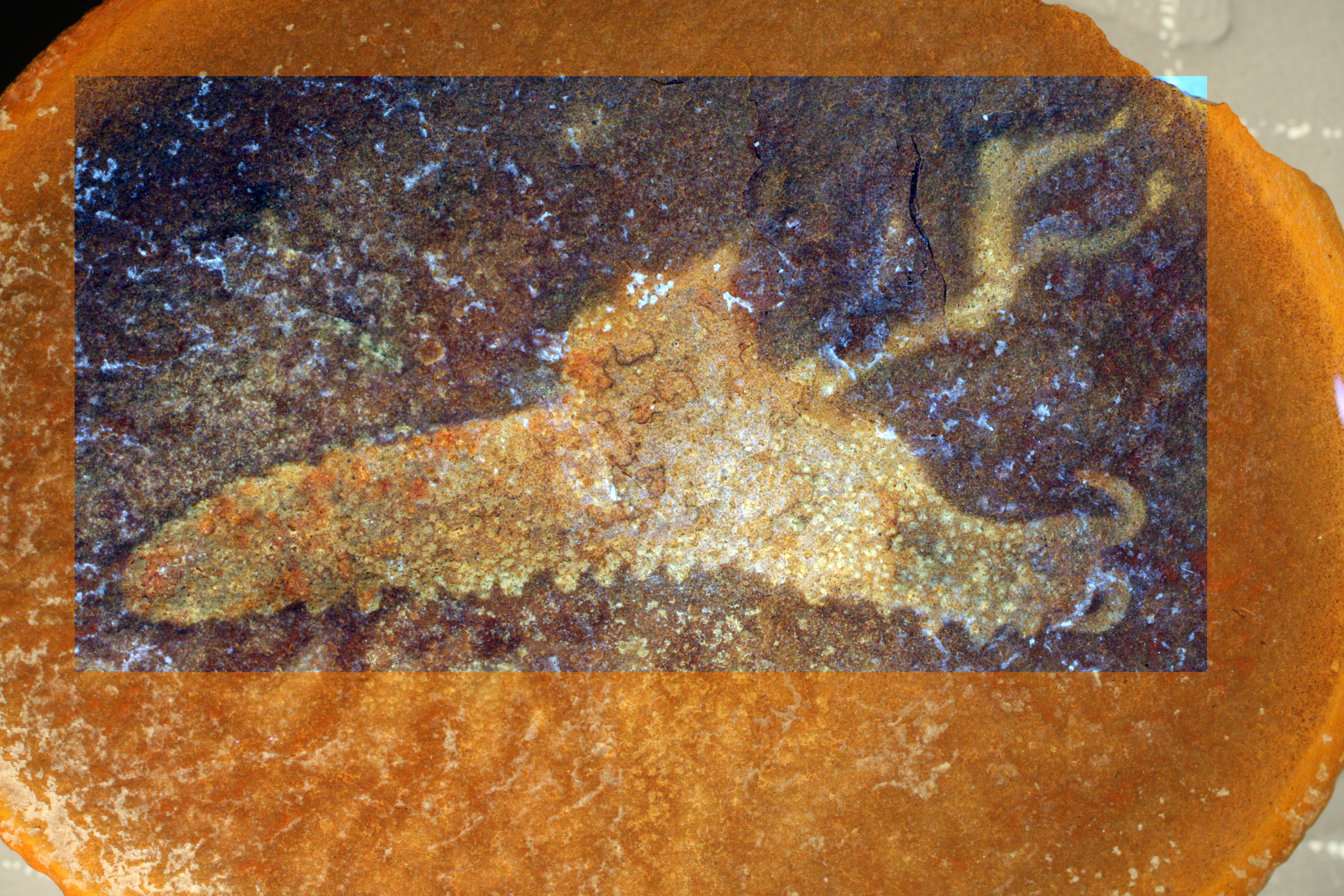
FMNH PE13966 counterpart

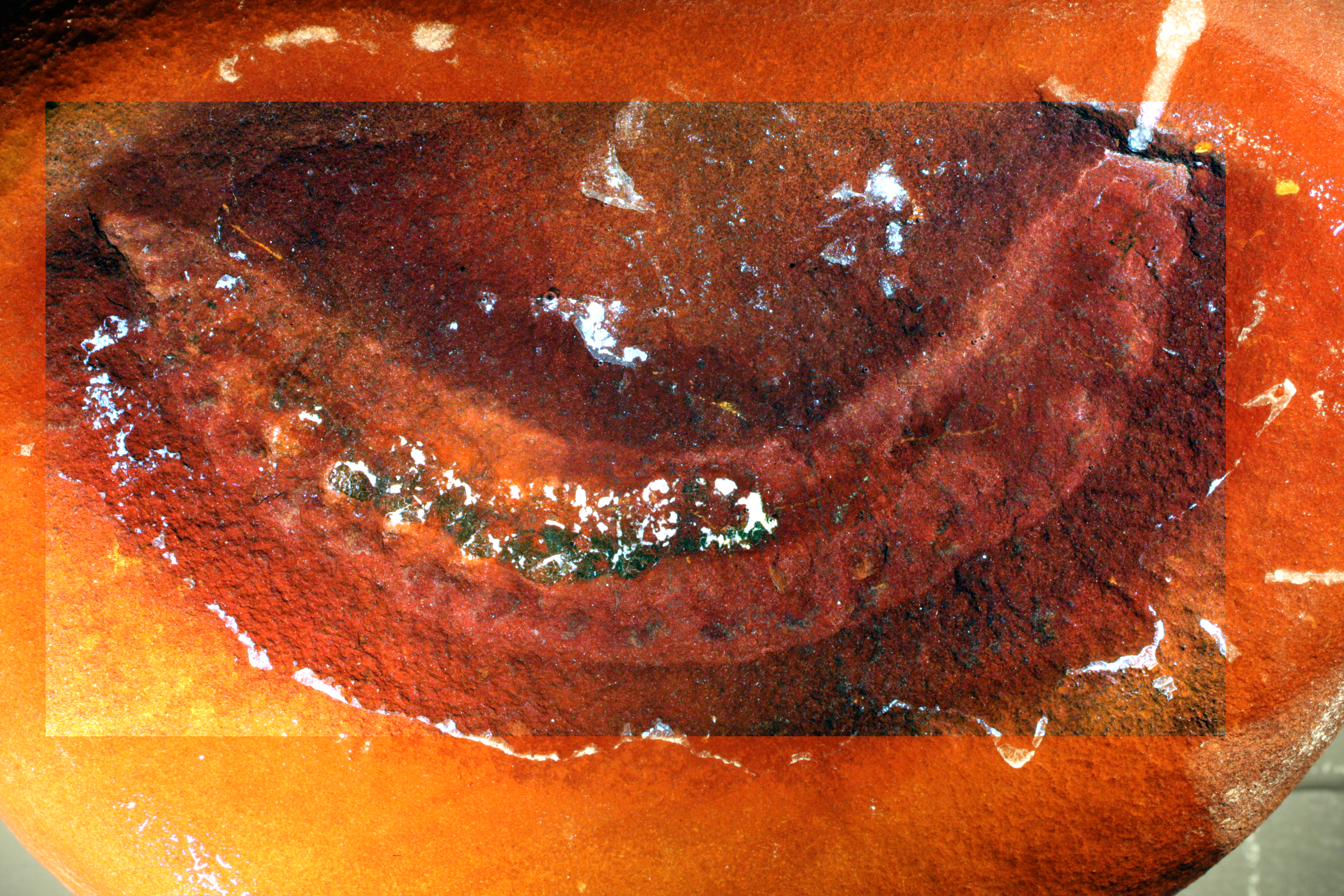
FMNH 33380 part

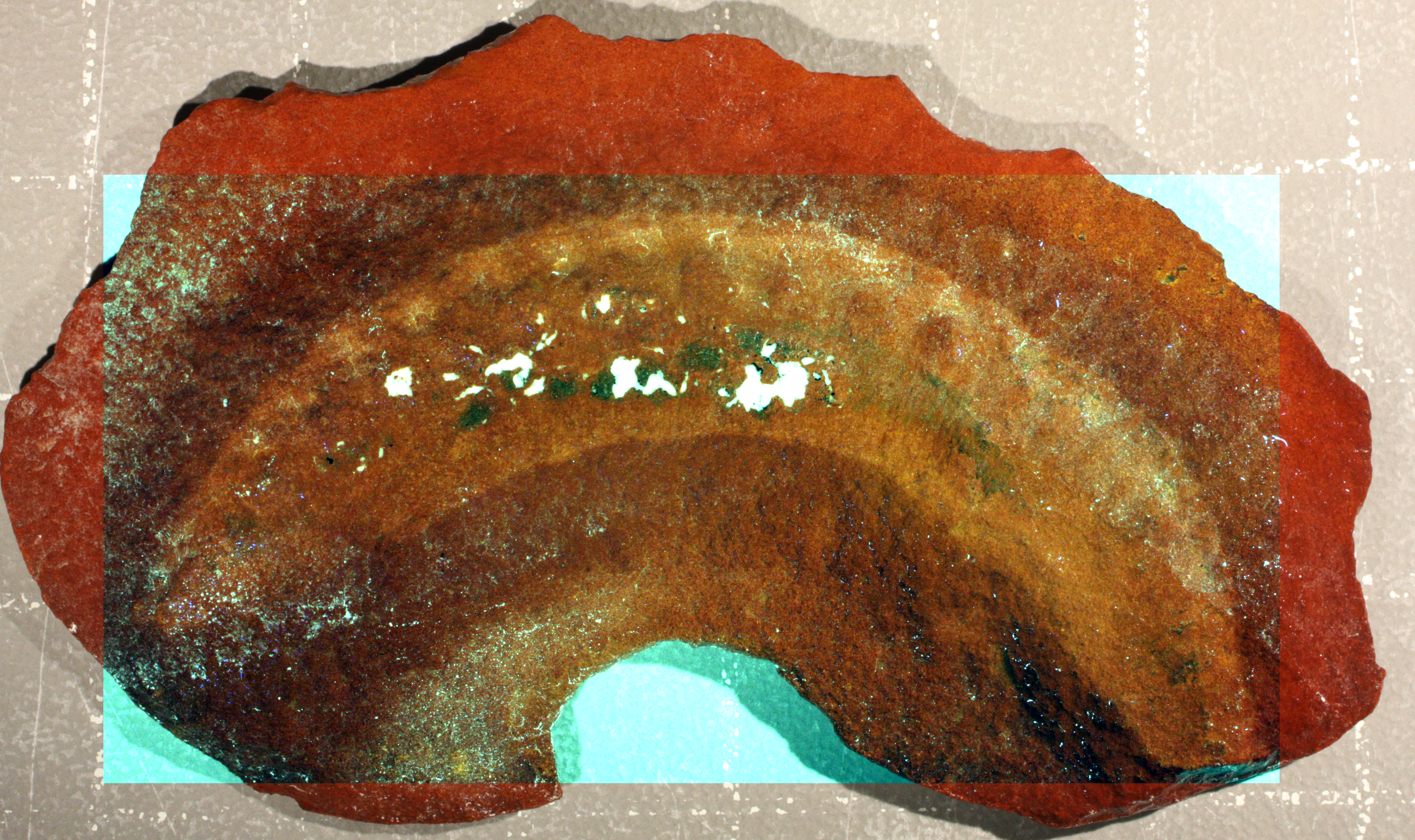
FMNH 33380 counterpart

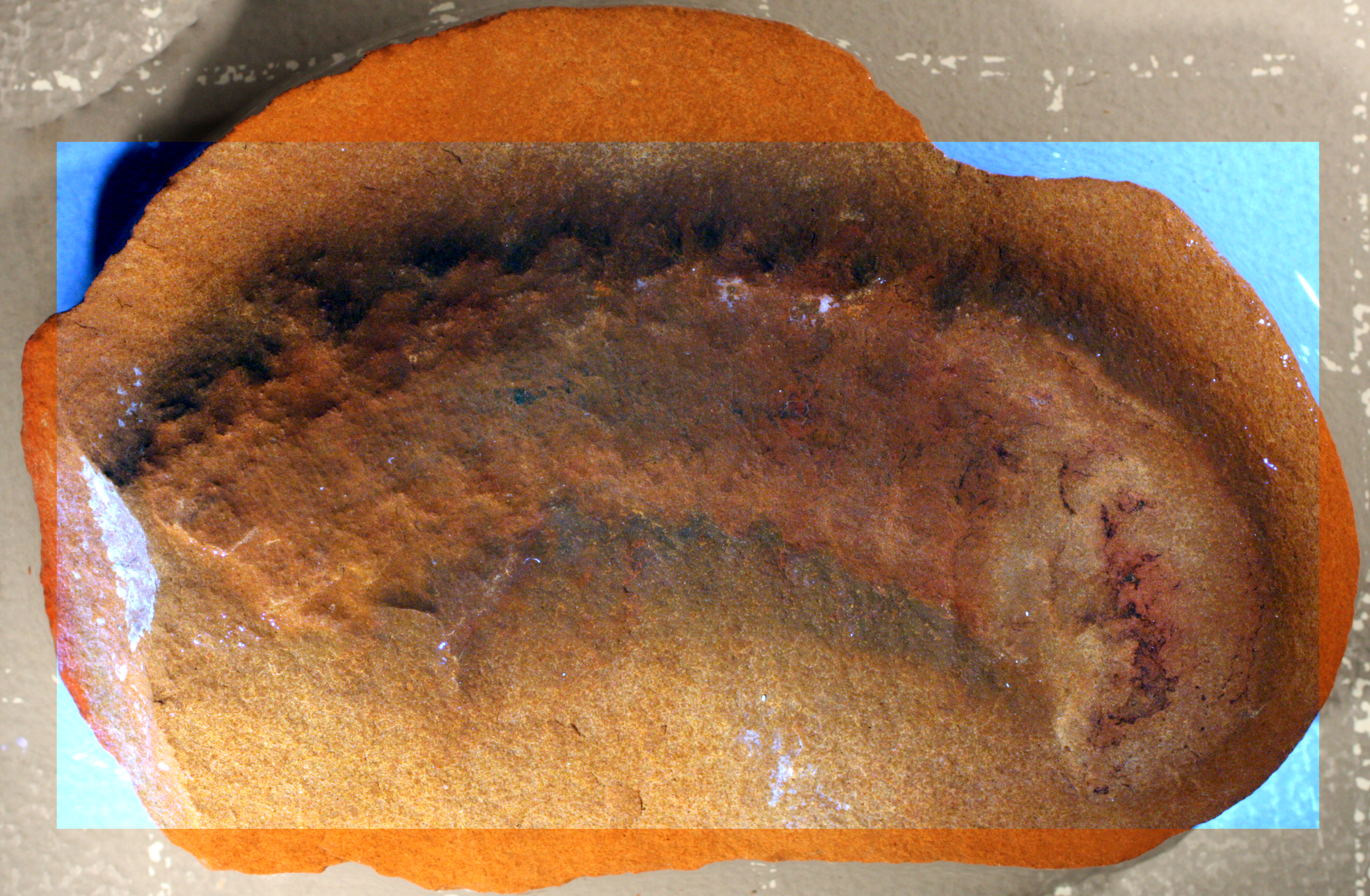
FMNH PE33822 part

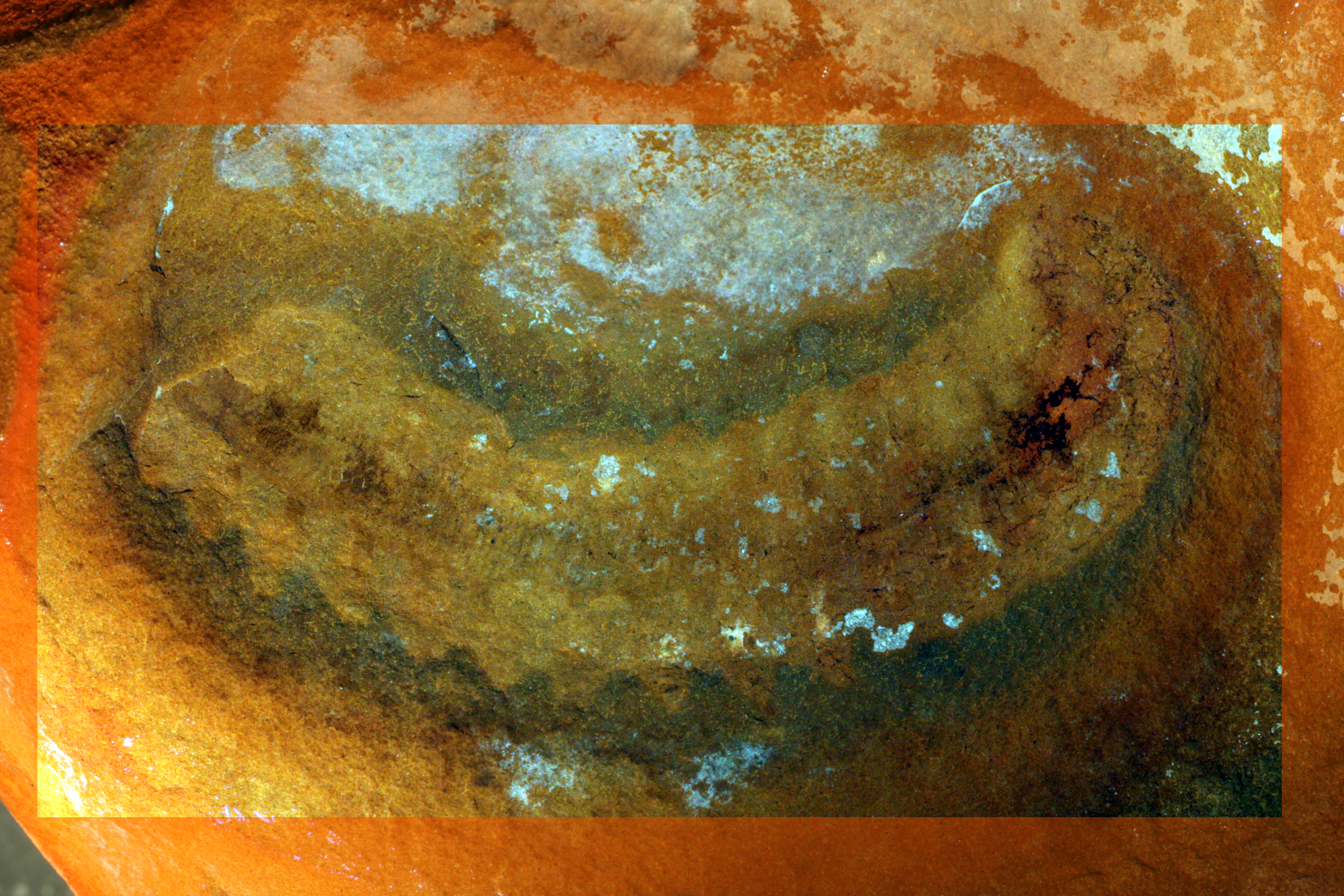
FMNH PE33822 counterpart

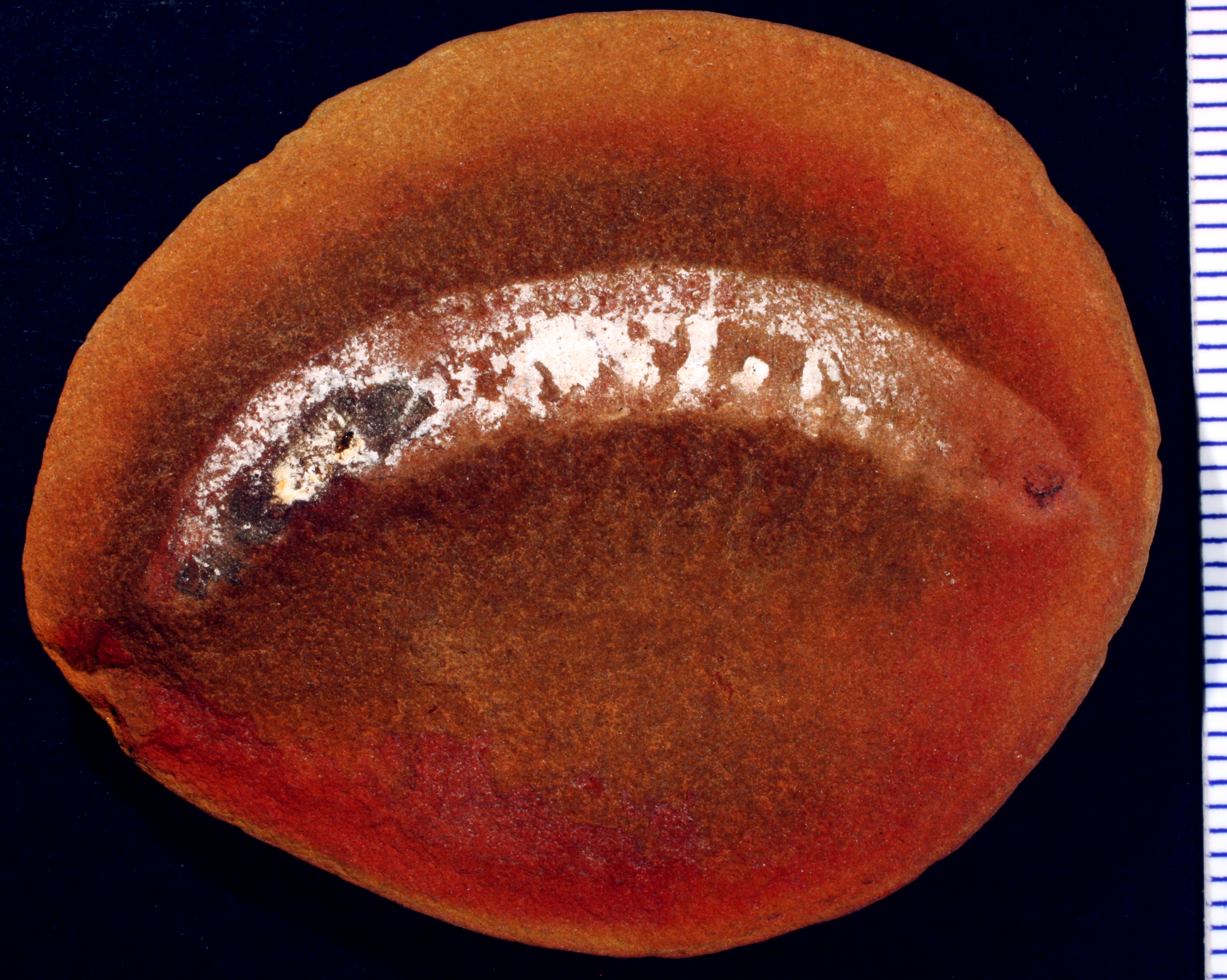
FMNH PE45049

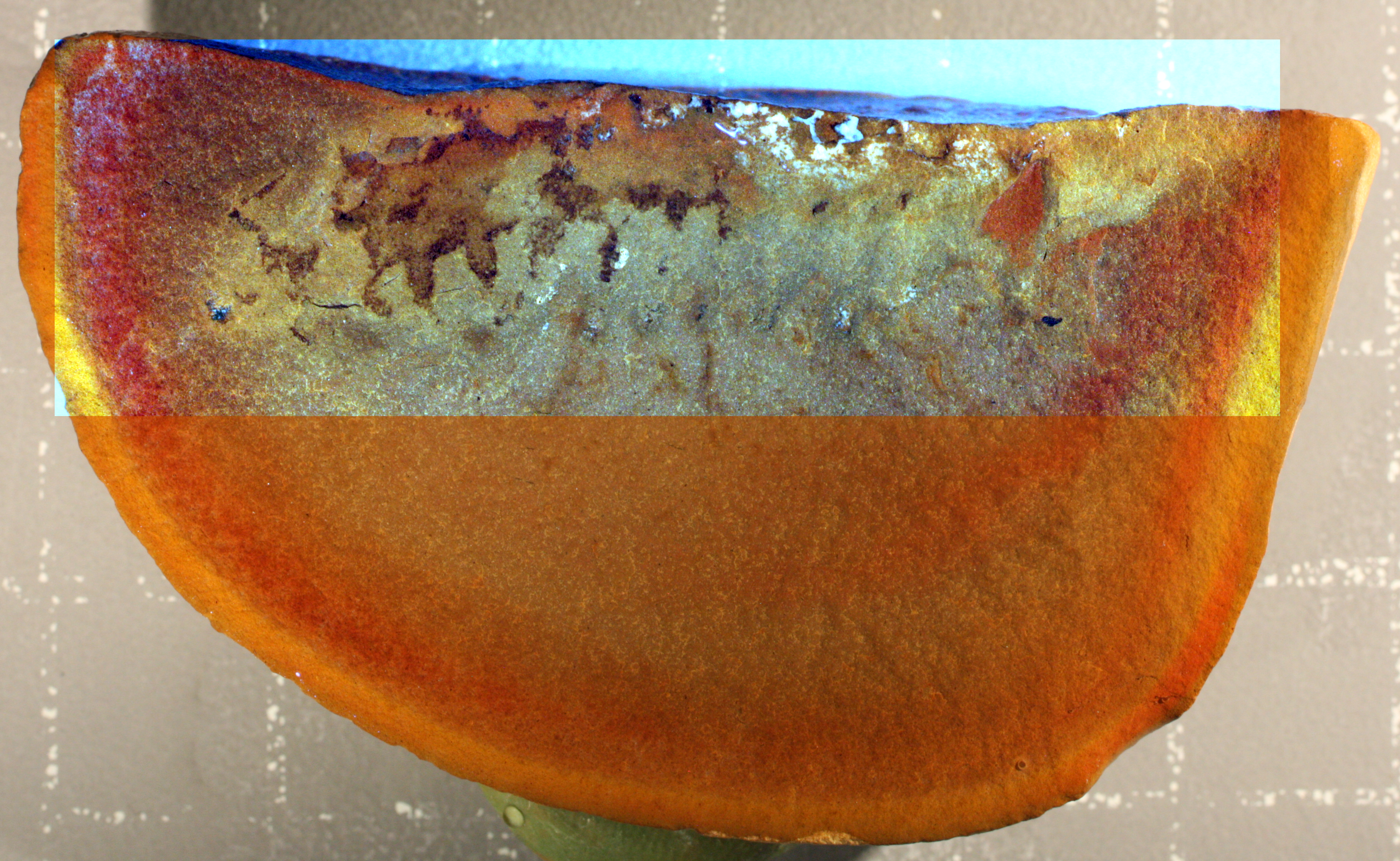
FMNH PE49784
