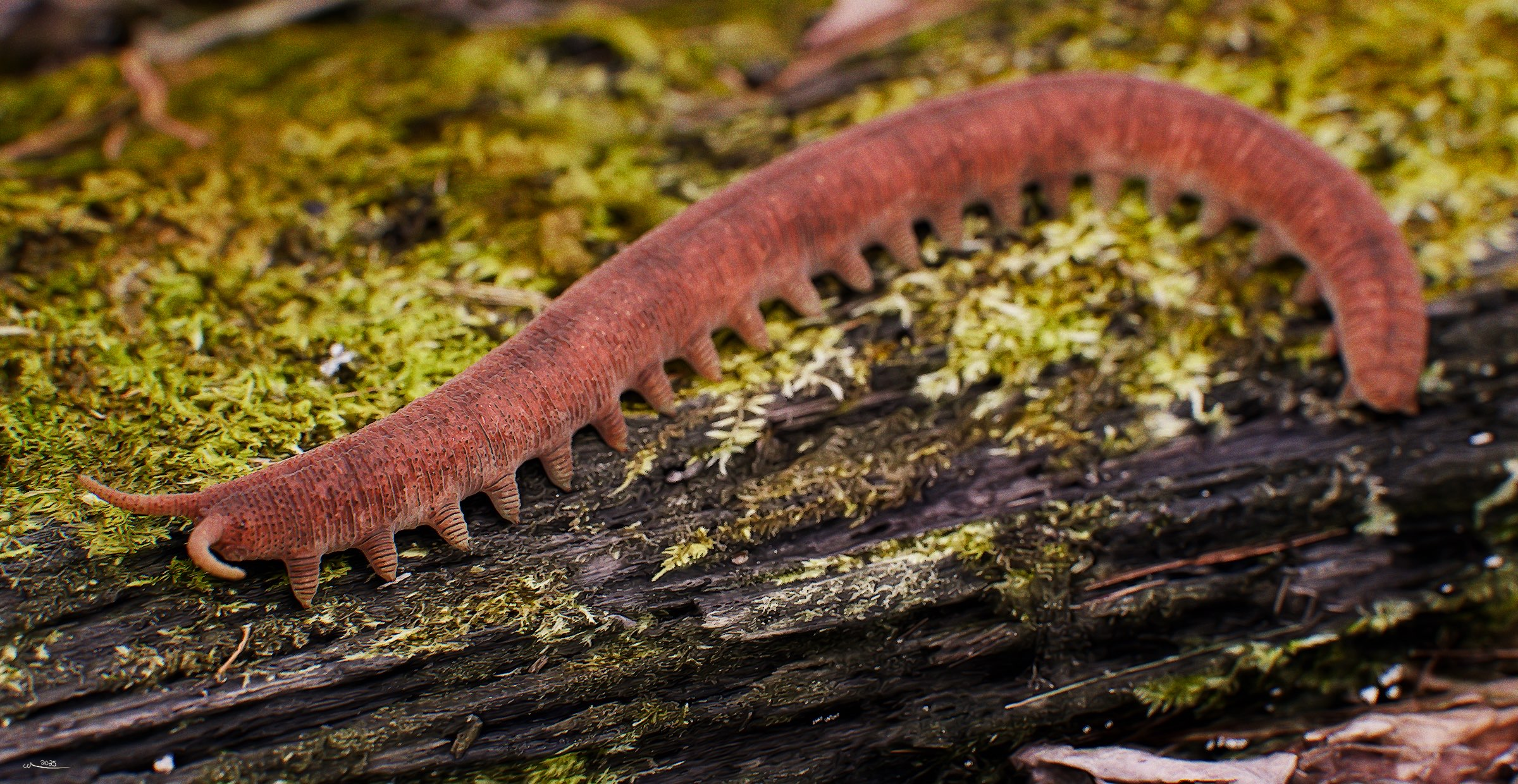
- Life restoration

Scientific classification
- Kingdom: Animalia
- Phylum: Onychophora
- Family: Peripatidae
- Genus: †Cretoperipatus; Engel & Grimaldi, 2002
- Species: †C. burmiticus

Binomial name
- †Cretoperipatus burmiticus Engel & Grimaldi, 2002

= Cretoperipatus =

Cretoperipatus Temporal range: Early Cenomanian ~99 Ma

Extinct genus of basal Peripatid velvet worm found in Cretaceous-aged amber

Cretoperipatus burmiticus is an extinct species of peripatid velvet worm known from Burmese amber. It is the sole member of the genus Cretoperipatus. This animal lived in what is now Myanmar's Kachin State during the Cenomanian age of the Late Cretaceous. When first discovered, the back of Cretoperipatus was misinterpreted as its the front. This led to multiple incorrect interpretations of the animal's anatomy, something only realized 14 years later. Cretoperipatus is known from several specimens that show a variety of sizes, ages, and levels of preservation. One fossil is exceptionally preserved, allowing detailed analysis of its morphology and coloration.

Cretoperipatus had 22 pairs of legs and was brown with a lighter underbelly. It also had multiple types of dermal papillae (small bumps on its cuticle) found across the body. The animal's head possessed a pair of antennae, two well-developed ocelli (a type of simple eye), a pair of slime papillae, a pair of frontal organs, and also preserved the structure of its internal jaws. The trunk preserved traces of its preventral and ventral organs as well as the genital pad. On its legs, Cretoperipatus had multiple spinous pads and a foot with a pair of claws. Depending on the pair, the number and structure of spinous pads differ.

Currently, Cretoperipatus is the only Mesozoic onychophoran as well as the oldest definitive member of the velvet worm crown group. Based on details of its legs, dermal papillae, trunk, and jaw, Cretoperipatus is placed in the family Peripatidae. It likely grouped with basal Asian genera like Eoperipatus and Typhloperipatus, being closest relatives with the latter.

Cretoperipatus was a terrestrial animal that lived in a biodiverse coastal rainforest. Based on its age, Cretoperipatus lived before the Indian subcontinent collided with Eurasia. This demonstrates that Asian velvet worms did not originate from India, instead arriving sometime earlier.

== Discovery and naming ==
Cretoperipatus was first described in 2002 paper by David A. Grimaldi, Michael S. Engel, and Paul C. Nascimbene. The animal was then redescribed in 2016 by Ivo de Sena Oliveira, Ming Bai, Henry Jahn, Vladimir Gross, Christine Martin, Jörg U. Hammel, Weiwei Zhang, and Georg Mayer after acquiring more specimens.

Both the holotype (AMNH Bu218) and various topotypes (BU-001467, BU-001468, ZZZ0066) were found in Burmese amber near Tanai Village in what is now Myanmar's Kachin State. Additional undescribed specimens were found in the same location, suggesting this animal was fairly abundant. In its original description, Cretoperipatus was dated to between 90 and 100 million years ago. Later research constrained its maximum age of 98.79 ± 0.62 million years old, meaning the animal lived at the beginning of the Late Cretaceous during the Cenomanian Age.

Currently, the holotype (AMNH Bu218) is deposited at the American Museum of Natural History. Two of the topotypes (BU-001467 and BU-001468) are deposited at the Three Gorges Entomological Institute, while the other (ZZZ0066) is in a private collection owned by Zezhao Zheng.

The animal's genus name is derived from the root "creto-", meaning Cretaceous, and "Peripatus", the type genus of the family Peripatidae. The species name "burmiticus" references the taxon being known from Burmese amber.

== Description ==
Due to being encased in amber, Cretoperipatus specimens preserve minute details that would otherwise be lost in the typical fossilization process. One specimen (BU-001468) is preserved in three dimensions, allowing researchers to create an intricate 3D render of its anatomy. BU-001468 also preserves pigment, showing Cretoperipatus had a brown back with a lighter underbelly.

Newer specimens of Cretoperipatus are known from multiple ages and sizes. BU-00146 was the largest, measuring around 26 millimeters. This specimen is nearly complete, but poorly preserved. BU-001468 measured around 13 millimeters long but only preserved the anterior (front) half of its body. Unlike the other topotypes, this specimen was exceptionally preserved. ZZZ0066 was the smallest specimen and a juvenile, measuring around 5 millimeters long. Like the largest specimen, this one was nearly complete but poorly preserved.

=== Dermal Papillae ===
Cretoperipatus's body was covered in rings of bumps known as dermal papillae. One of the most prominent types was primary papillae. These have a bristle at their tip and would have given the animal a sense of touch. In Cretoperipatus, the primary papillae are divisible into three parts: a larger part on the bottom known as a basal piece, a smaller part in the middle known as the apical piece, and a bristle on top used for sensing the environment. In Cretoperipatus, the basal piece is easily distinguishable from the apical piece and has five scale ranks. The apical piece is asymmetrically shaped because it has three scale ranks in the front and two in the back. In addition to primary papillae, Cretoperipatus possessed accessory papillae. These lacked a sensory bristle or distinct pieces, instead only having scale ranks.

=== Eyes, antennae, and frontal organs ===
Cretoperipatus had a single pair of antennae with well-developed eyes called ocelli at their base. The top of the antenna possessed rings of specialized primary papillae known as type 1 sensilla. These are distinguished from regular primary papillae by their prominent apical piece and the bristles having a textured base. The undersides of the antennae possessed an array of spindle-shaped sensilla. These papillae are similar to type 1 sensilla, but have a large, spindly-shaped basal piece. In addition to papillae, the animal possessed a pair of frontal organs at the base of the antennae and beneath the eyes.

=== Mouth, jaws, and slime papillae ===
Cretoperipatus had a ventral (bottom-facing) mouth with two internal jaws. In the original description, the animal's genital pad was mistaken for the mouth. This was due to the holotype (AMNH Bu218)'s poor preservation and the two structures looking superficially similar. In the specimens BU-001467 and ZZZ0066, the mouth wasn't preserved. However, the mouth of BU-001468 was partially exposed and preserved six oral lips (bean-like structures that surround the mouth). This indicates Cretoperipatus had at least six oral lips on either side of its mouth.

Since the jaws of BU-001467 were separated in the amber matrix, their structure is clearly discernible. Cretoperipatus had an inner jaw blade with a large principal tooth (which resembles a large claw). Lower down, the inner jaw blade had three smaller claw-like structures known as accessory teeth. Beneath these was a saw-like structure known as the denticle blade. This had 11 serrations called denticles. Rather than being connected, the denticle and inner jaw blade were separated by a piece of tissue known as the diastemal membrane. This tissue tapered off near the serrated portion of the jaw and created a small gap called a diastema.

Like other velvet worms, Cretoperipatus possessed a pair of slime papillae on the sides of its head. In BU-001468, these were preserved retracted. As a result, they were somewhat hard to distinguish, even when using x-ray microscopy.

=== Trunk ===
Cretoperipatus had around twelve plicae (bands) of dermal papillae on each segment of its trunk. Out of the twelve, seven plicae passed between the legs and formed large continuous rings. Meanwhile, the other five were restricted to the animal's dorsal (back) region and varied in length. The dorsal plicae had a pattern of one or two accessory papillae separated by two primary ones. On the other hand, the ventral (underbelly) plicae lacked a set pattern and had smaller papillae overall.

Certain regions of the trunk possessed crater-shaped papillae. These are a variant of accessory papillae with a central depression and a collar of scales. They come in two types differentiated by their shape and location. In Cretoperipatus, the type 1 crater-shaped papillae were small, rounded, and had a collar made up of eight scales. These were randomly distributed on plicae near the legs. The type 2 variants were larger, elongated, and found in the interplical space (folds between the plicae). They were arranged in curved rows of six papillae, with two occurring between each set of legs. The first row was located on the animal's sides and curved upward, while the second row was on the underbelly and curved inward. When combined, the two rows formed a convex lens.

In addition to plicae and dermal papillae, Cretoperipatus had a dorsomedial furrow (a long grove) running along the middle of its back. On its underside, the trunk preserved traces of the preventral and ventral organs. These were rounded in shape and located on the midline of its body between each pair of legs. At the very end of the trunk, Cretoperipatus had a genital pad between its penultimate (second to last) pair of legs.

=== Lobopods ===
Cretoperipatus had a pair of legs known as lobopods on each segment of its trunk. Based on complete specimens (BU-001467 and ZZZ0066), the animal had 22 pairs of legs. Like in other velvet worms, the lobopods had a papillae-covered base, spinose pads or cushions, and a clawed foot. The animal lacked coxal organs on any of legs and lacked crural papillae on the front-most pairs.

Cretoperipatus was originally described as having only three spiny pads per lobopod, However, better specimens show almost all of its lobopods have four. Oliveira et al. suggested that the original describers mistook the holotype's back-most legs with its front, as this specimen was poorly preserved and a velvet worm's endmost legs have fewer cushions.

On a typical leg of Cretoperipatus, the distal (furthest away from the trunk) and proximal (closest to the trunk) cushions are thinner than the two in between. Leg pairs 1 and 2 have four spinous pads. Pair 3 was similar, but it also possessed a vestigial fifth pad. This fifth pad was fragmented and split into four patches. Leg pairs 4 and 5 had only four pads. However, the third pad (the 2nd closest to the body) was split in two by a nephridial tubercle, an organ used to dispel waste. Leg pairs 6 to 20 had the same structure as the 3rd: five spinous pads with a vestigial and fragmented fifth. The second to last (penultimate) pair of legs lacked a fifth pad. Instead, it had only four pads with the fourth being fragmented. Finally, matching what was observed in the holotype, the last (ultimate) pair of legs had only three spinous pads.

=== Feet and claws ===
The Cretoperipatus holotype had a foot with five basal papillae (primary papillae found at the base of the feet), with the bottom-most two being weakly developed. None of the new specimens preserved basal foot papillae on any of their feet. At the end of the foot were two distal papillae (primary papillae found at the end of the feet). These were located on either side of a pair of claws. In the specimen BU-001467, many of its claws were detached and found floating in the amber matrix. This indicates that, as in modern velvet worms, the claws are connected by only a fragile membrane of tissue.

== Classification ==
- Peripatidae
  - - Eoperipatus
    - - Typhloperipatus
      - †Cretoperipatus
  - - Mesoperipatus
    - Neopatida

Proposed phylogenetic position.

Cretoperipatus burmiticus is one of two fossils confidently assigned to Onychophora, the other being the Late Carboniferous Antennipatus. However, unlike Antennipatus, Cretoperipatus is confidently assigned to the velvet worm crown-group. As of now, Cretoperipatus is the only described Mesozoic onychophoran and oldest-known member of the onychophoran crown group.

When first described by Grimaldi et al., Cretoperipatus was assigned to the family Peripatidae. This assignment was based on the following characteristics: Cretoperipatus had around 12 complete annuli on each segment of its trunk, the trunk annuli did not fuse laterally, its nephridial opening was at the base of the lobopods, it lacked crural papillae on the front-most legs, it lacked coxal organs, its primary papillae were divisible into two parts (basal and apical), its genital pad was between the penultimate legs, it possessed spindle-shaped sensilla on its antennae, and it had a diastema on its jaw blade.

The position of Cretoperipatus was further refined by Oliveira et al., who found it grouped with the basal, South Asian genera Eoperipatus and Typhloperipatus. These two genera were themselves suspected to be sister taxa based on morphology, which has been confirmed using molecular analysis. Like these genera, Cretoperipatus had two distal papillae on its feet (other peripatids have three or more). It lacked the ventral fields of modified scales present in various Eoperipatus species. Unlike Eoperipatus but similar to Typhloperipatus, the foot's nephridial tubercle opening was on the third spinous pad rather than higher up. However, unlike Typhloperipatus, Cretoperipatus possessed eyes. Based on these characters, Cretoperipatus is likely the closest relative of Typhloperipatus. However, this relationship has not been phylogenetically tested.

== Evolutionary implications ==
It was historically hypothesized that onychophorans arrived in Asia due to northwards drift of India, which was once an independent continent. This was known as the "Out of India" hypothesis and explained how velvet worms colonized South and Southeast Asia. Cretoperipatus refutes this, as it had clear affinities with Asian velvet worms and was present before the Asia-India collision during the Late Oligocene. Some time after this collision, peripatids began colonizing Northeast India, probably from Myanmar. Combined with the presence of other Northern Hemisphere onychophorans (Antennipatus, Helenodora, and tentatively Succinipatopsis), velvet worms occurred in Laurasia (the precursor of North America and Eurasia) far longer than originally thought.

== Paleoenvironment ==
Cretoperipatus was a terrestrial animal that lived in a coastal, tropical rainforest. This ecosystem hosted a wide variety of flora and fauna, being especially abundant in arthropods. One specimen (BU-00146) was preserved alongside various plant and arthropod fragments, however the identity of these fragments are unknown. While many of the surrounding arthropods have modern representatives, there were a few exceptions. A notable example is Chimerarachne, a late-surviving arachnid relict that is closely related to spiders.
