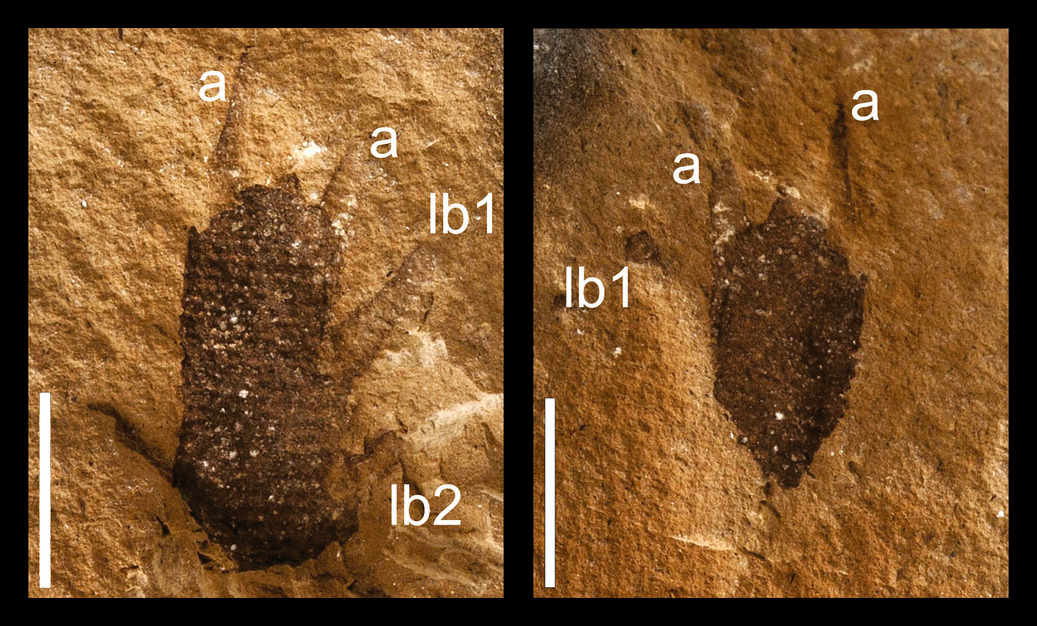
- One of the three Antennipatus fossils (SOT006706, part and counterpart)

Scientific classification
- Kingdom: Animalia
- Phylum: Onychophora
- Genus: †Antennipatus; Garwood, Edgecombe & Giribet, 2016
- Species: †A. montceauensis

Binomial name
- †Antennipatus montceauensis Garwood, Edgecombe & Giribet, 2016

= Antennipatus =

Antennipatus Temporal range: Stephanian

Extinct genus of velvet worm and oldest confirmed Onychophoran

Antennipatus montceauensis is an extinct species of onychophoran, a group colloquially known as velvet worms, from the Montceau-les-Mines lagerstätte of what is now France. The animal is the sole member of its genus and notably the oldest confirmed onychophoran fossil. While known of since the 1980s, Antennipatus was described almost 4 decades later in 2016. Currently, the animal has three described specimens with varying levels of preservation. All of are 305 million years old and date to the Stephanian stage of the Late Carboniferous.

Anatomically, Antennipatus resembles modern velvet worms. The animal had rings of dermal papillae along most of its body, with those on the antennae alternating between wide and narrow bands. On its underside, Antennipatus had a putative ventral mouth that preserved what were likely lip papillae. The animal had stubby legs, and on one specimen, definite slime papillae.

Antennipatus was originally thought to be a member of the genus Helenodora. However, this was quickly dismissed after its description. Based on its anatomy, Antennipatus was at least somewhat terrestrial, but due to the way it was preserved, is difficult to place phylogenetically. Antennipatus could either be basal to the velvet worm crown group (the common ancestor of Peripatidae and Peripatopsidae plus all of its descendants) or located somewhere inside it.

== History of discovery and naming ==
While undescribed at the time, Antennipatus was known of as far back as 1981. A 1982 paper mentioned the animal, saying it was a definite onychophoran (a group colloquially known as velvet worms) due to its well-preserved antennae. The same paper considered it virtually identical to Helenodora from the Mazon Creek fossil beds. Later studies from 1988 and 2014 displayed various undescribed fossils and documented additional specimens. In 2016, Antennipatus was officially described by Russel J. Garwood, Gregory D. Edgecombe, Sylvain Charbonnier, Dominique Chabard, Daniel Sotty, and Gonzalo Giribet (Sotty and Charbonnier had published on the animal before its formal description).

Currently, there are three known fossils of Antennipatus: the holotype (MNHN SOT003121) and two paratypes (MNHN SOT003122 and SOT006706). All fossils can be divided into a part (labeled with an "a") and counterpart (labeled with a "b") and were found in the Montceau-les-Mines lagerstätte of Central France. All fossils are 305 million years old and date to the Late Stephanian, a stage equivalent to the Kasimovian-Gzhelian boundary of the late Pennsylvanian.

Both the holotype and paratypes were deposited in the Jacques de La Comble Natural History Museum of Autun, but belong to the National Museum of Natural History (MNHN) of Paris.

Antennipatus gets its genus name from its well-preserved, onychophoran-like antennae. The species name "montceauensis" was given due to originating in Montceau-les-Mines.

== Description ==
=== Head ===
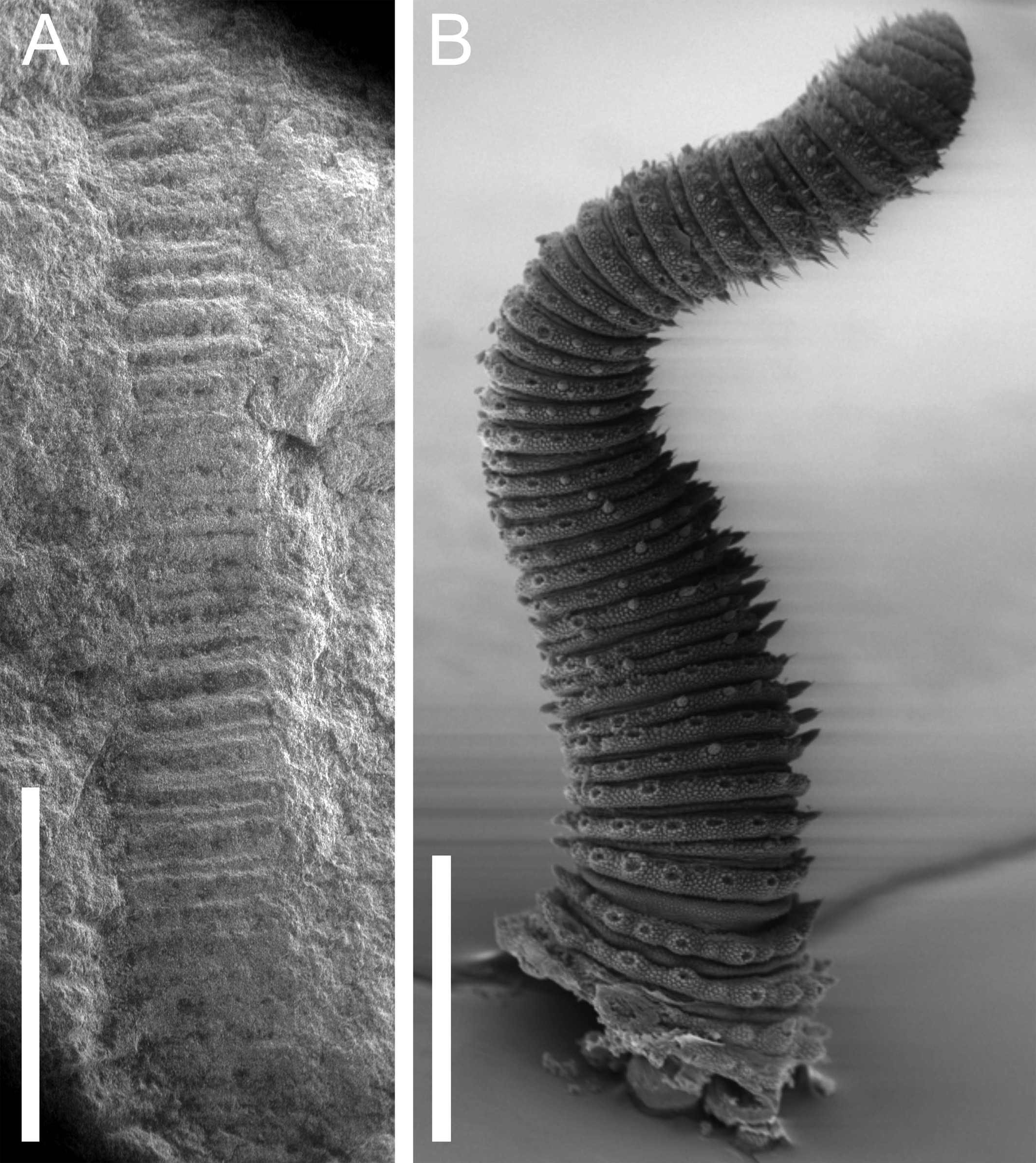
Comparison of Antennipatus's antenna to that of the living Epiperipatus isthmicola.

Antennipatus had slender, onychophoran-like antennae. In the holotype (MNHN SOT003121) these preserved more than 40 annuli (rings of dermal papillae) in alternating wide and narrow bands. The same pattern is seen living velvet worms, for example, Epiperipatus isthmicola. As of now, not a single specimen of Antennipatus preserves eyes. This could be an artifact of preservation, though alternatively, it could have lacked eyes all together.

Two specimens of Antennipatus preserved what is likely a ventral (bottom-facing) mouth. This was preserved as a hole that is longer than it is wide, being 3.2 × 1.6 millimeters in the holotype and 1.8 × 1.2 millimeters in MNHN SOT003122. The hole was also surrounded by a circular protrusion, likely the remains of lip papillae. Since neither specimens preserve jaws, the mouth was either closed or filled with sediment when being fossilized.

Behind the antennae and to the sides of the mouth were a pair of slime papillae. These are clearly defined in MNHN SOT003121b, but might be present in MNHN SOT006706. Rather than something else, the appendages were interpreted as slime papillae based on their anterolateral (higher up on the sides) location, lack of annulation compared to other limbs, and due to being noticeably shorter than the proceeding legs.

=== Trunk and lobopods ===
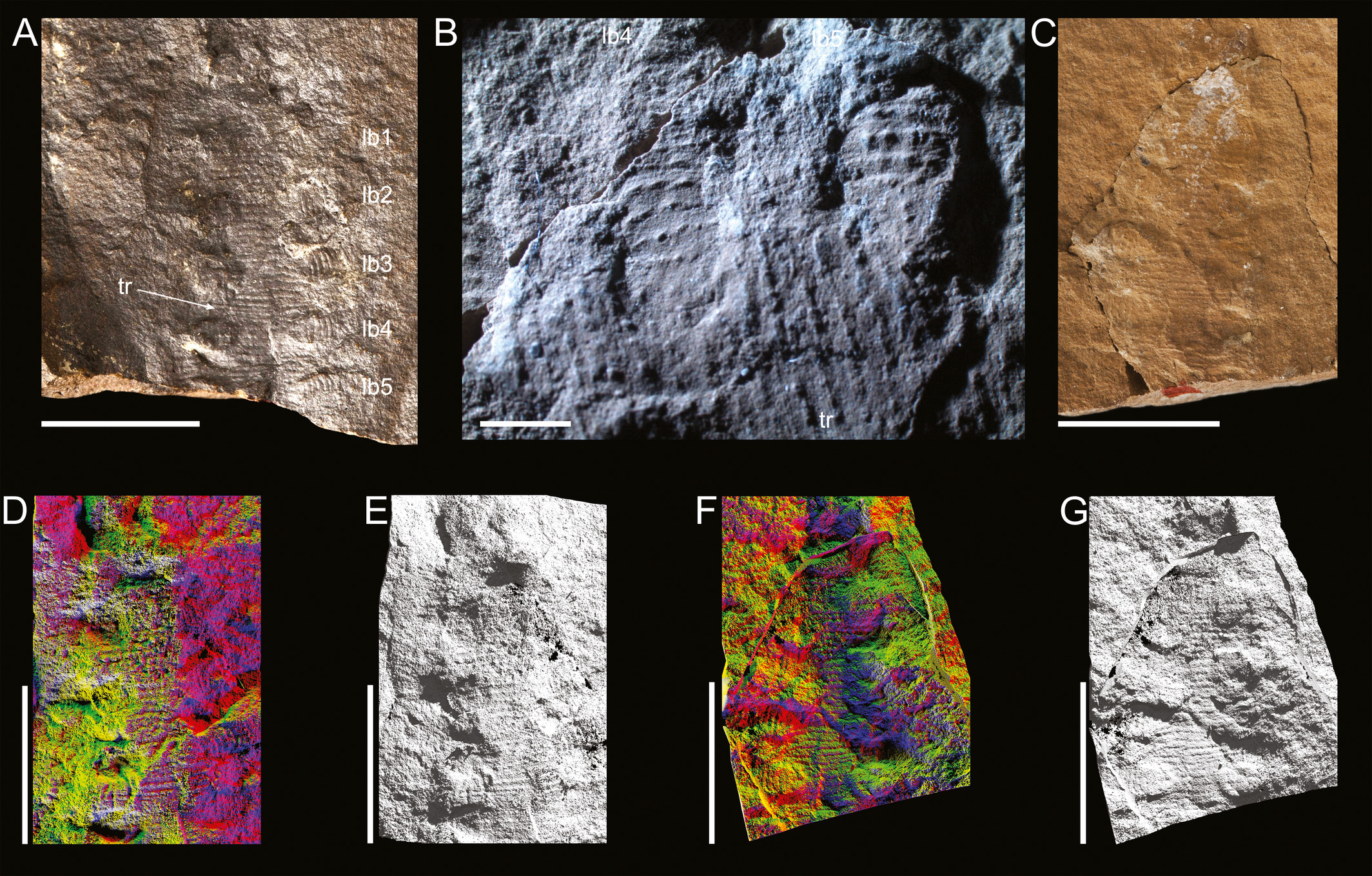
MNHN SOT003122a (part) and SOT003122b (counterpart). Notice the preservation of plicae by visible ridges and dermal papillae.

None of the three fossils preserve the hind part of Antennipatus's anatomy, meaning how many legs it had, the position of its anus, and the position of its genital pad are unknown. Luckily, a few trunk segments managed to be preserved, giving some insight on their structure. The trunk had a minimum of 5 segments, with 8 plicae (bands of dermal papillae) per segment. The plicae are preserved as rows of papillae separated by horizontal ridges. Like in modern onychophorans, each segment of the trunk possessed a pair of legs known as lobopods. These preserved annulations, having eight to ten per leg. However, the lobopods lacked claws or spinous pads. The trunk also lacked tracheal openings, though this is probably a result of being small and unlikely to preserve outside of amber.

== Classification ==
Video showing the holotype and both paratypes under a low-angle and multicolored lighting render.

Before its description, Antennipatus was considered virtually identical to Helenodora and possibly a member of the same genus. Though, after being described, both were found to differ in a few key ways. On its trunk, Helenodora has nine plicae per segment while Antennipatus has eight. Antennipatus was also significantly larger, though this may be caused by the specimens being of different ontogenetic ages.

Generally, Antennipatus is regarded as the earliest-known onychophoran. Despite this, it is difficult to phylogenetically place due to lacking several informative traits. For instance, the jaw blade and genital opening are either hidden or completely absent, preventing even a family-level assignment (Peripatidae or Peripatopsidae). Based on a time-calibrated phylogeny, Antennipatus predates the diversification of Peripatopsidae by around 100 million years and is within the error bar of early Peripatidae diversification.

Since it lived in the Northern Hemisphere and had a large body size, Antennipatus could have affinities with peripatids (either part of the crown or stem-group). Yet, as mentioned before, this can not be clearly demonstrated. The animal differs from living Peripatidae in the number of plicae on its trunk. Compared to Antennipatus's 8, most peripatids have 12 but up to 24 plicae per segment. Velvet worms are estimated to have first appeared in the Late Devonian. Combined with the animal's terrestrial lifestyle and placement in time, Antennipatus could easily be a crown-group onychophoran. Nonetheless, later studies treat this with caution. A 2018 paper by Gonzalo et al. viewed Antennipatus a true onychophoran of uncertain placement. It could either be in the crown group (the common ancestor of Peripatidae and Peripatopsidae plus all of its descendants) or outside of this in the stem group. A 2021 paper by Baker et al. agreed with this, but conservatively treated it as a stem-group representative for the purposes of their study. A 2025 paper by Knecht et al. redescribing the lobopodian Palaeocampa anthrax recovered Antennipatus as an onychophoran in a polytomy with the extinct Cretoperipatus, Helenodora, and various living velvet worms.

- - †Diania
  - - †Lenisambulatrix
    - - - †Paucipodia
        - - †Thanahita
          - - †Eoconchariidae
              - †Microdictyon
              - †Fusuchoncharium
              - †Quadratapora
            - - - †Xenusion
                - †Onychodictyon
              - - †Strictocorniculum
                - †Rhombocorniculum
                - †Orstenotubulus
                - †Carbotubulus
                - †Hallucigenia fortis
                - †Hallucigenia sparsa
                - - †"Hallucigenia" hongmeia
                  - - †Cardiodictyon
                    - - Tardigrada (tardigrades)
                      - †Luolishaniida
                        - - †Ovatiovermis
                          - †Facivermis
                        - - †Luolishania
                          - †Collinsovermidae
                            - †EBS Collinsovermid (SAM P14848)
                            - - †Acinocricus
                              - - †Collinsovermis
                                - - †Collinsium
                                  - †Entothyreos
      - - †Aysheaiidae
          - †Aysheaia
          - - Soom Shale lobopodian (C1947)
            - - †Hadranax
              - †Palaeocampa
        - Antennopoda
          - - †Antennacanthopodia
            - Onychophora (velvet worms)
              - †Antennipatus
              - †Cretoperipatus
              - †Helenodora
              - Living onychophorans
          - - †Siberiidae
              - †Siberion
              - †Megadictyon
              - †Jianshanopodia
            - - - †Pambdelurion
                - †Kerygmachelidae
              - - †Opabiniidae
                - - †Radiodonta (e.g. Anomalocaris)
                  - Deuteropoda (modern arthropods)

== Paleobiology ==
=== Terrestriality ===
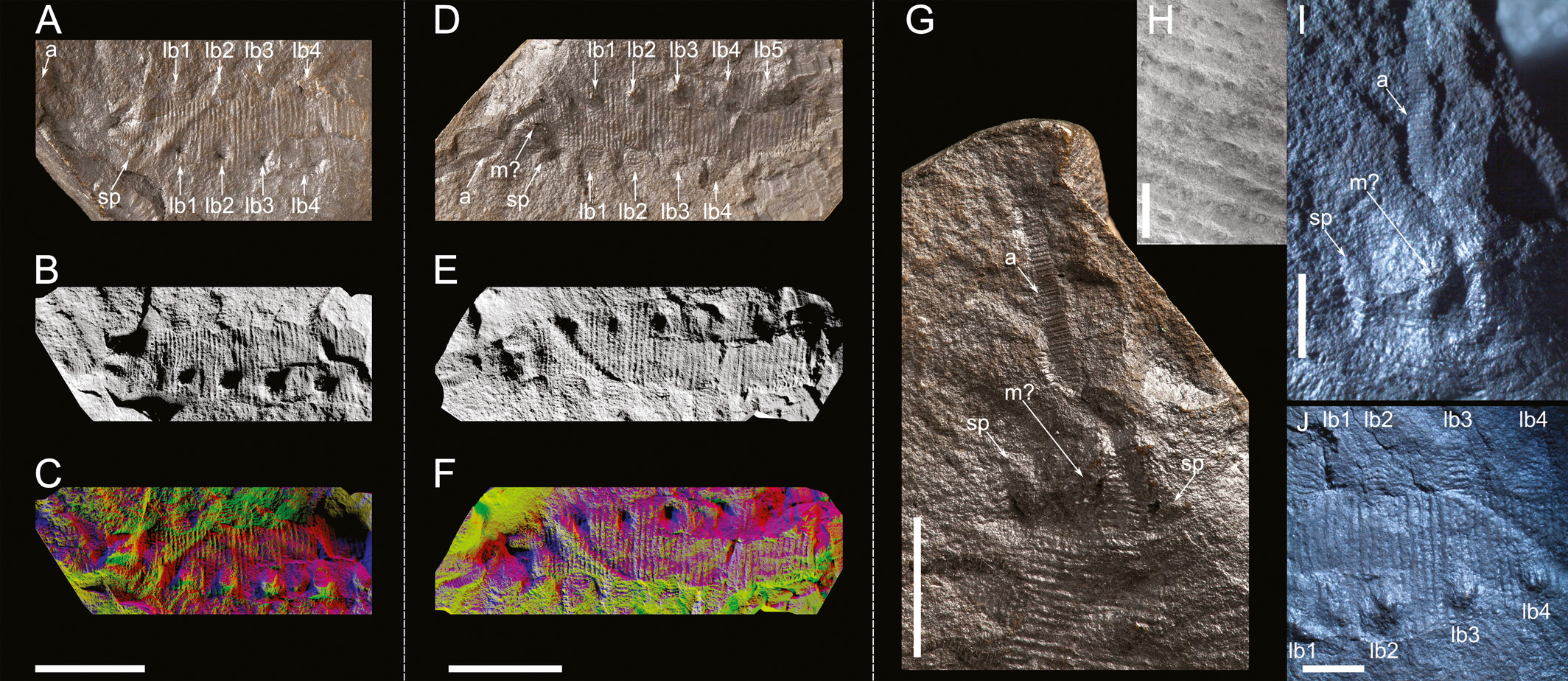
Antennipatus holotype MNHN SOT003121a (part) & SOT003121b (counterpart). This fossil has well preserved antenna, slime papillae, and a putative mouth with obscured jaws. The slime papillae are noticeably shorter than the other limbs.

Based on a variety of evidence, Antennipatus was a terrestrial or at least somewhat terrestrial animal. The best of these is at least one fossil (MNHN SOT003121a & b) preserves unequivocal slime papillae. Since these appendages can be drawn into the body, their absence fails to indicate that other specimens lacked them. For instance, in Cretoperipatus (a velvet worm preserved in amber), the slime papillae were barely distinguishable from the surrounding body, even in one of its best-preserved fossils. These appendages imply terrestriality due to the way they oscillate to shoot slime, something that would not work in an aquatic environment. Other terrestrial features (such as spiracles) are absent due to being incredibly small. Beyond its anatomy, another pointer towards a terrestrial existence was Antennipatus's depositional environment (something expanded upon in the section below).

== Paleoenvironment ==
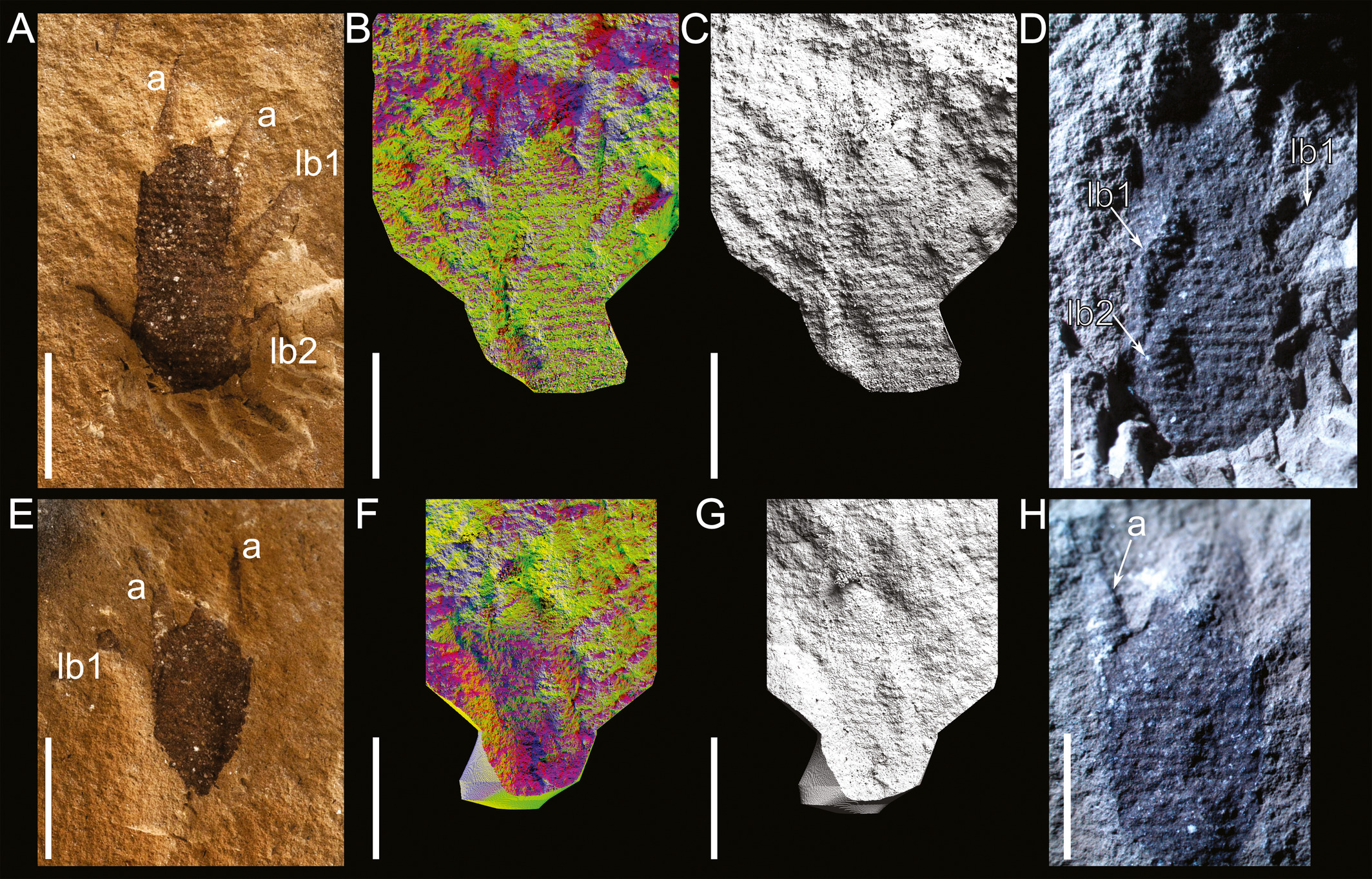
Antennipatus specimens MNHN SOT006706a (part) and SOT006706b (counterpart) under various types of lighting.

Antennipatus originated in siderite nodules from Montceau-les-Mines lagerstätte. This lagerstätte had a significant terrestrial influence, preserving numerous plants and animals that were purely terrestrial. Some of these include stem-spiders like Idmonarachne, giant Myriapods like Arthropleura, and the tree-sized horsetail Calamites. The ecosystem also supported a variety of aquatic life, including Syncarid crustaceans, lungfish, Alanops (a Xiphosuran related to horseshoe crabs), as well as the amphibious Temnospondyls and Nectrideans. Montecau was likely a freshwater depositional environment, having no structural, sedimentological, or paleogeographic evidence of marine influence. However, this has come under scrutiny. The locality preserves a few marine-associated organisms (for example, the amphinomid polychaete Palaeocampa) and was not sampled in the isotopic analysis of nearby localities. Because of this, it was probably closer to the Paleotethys Ocean than originally thought.
