= Dermal papillae (Onychophora) =

Feature of velvet worm anatomy

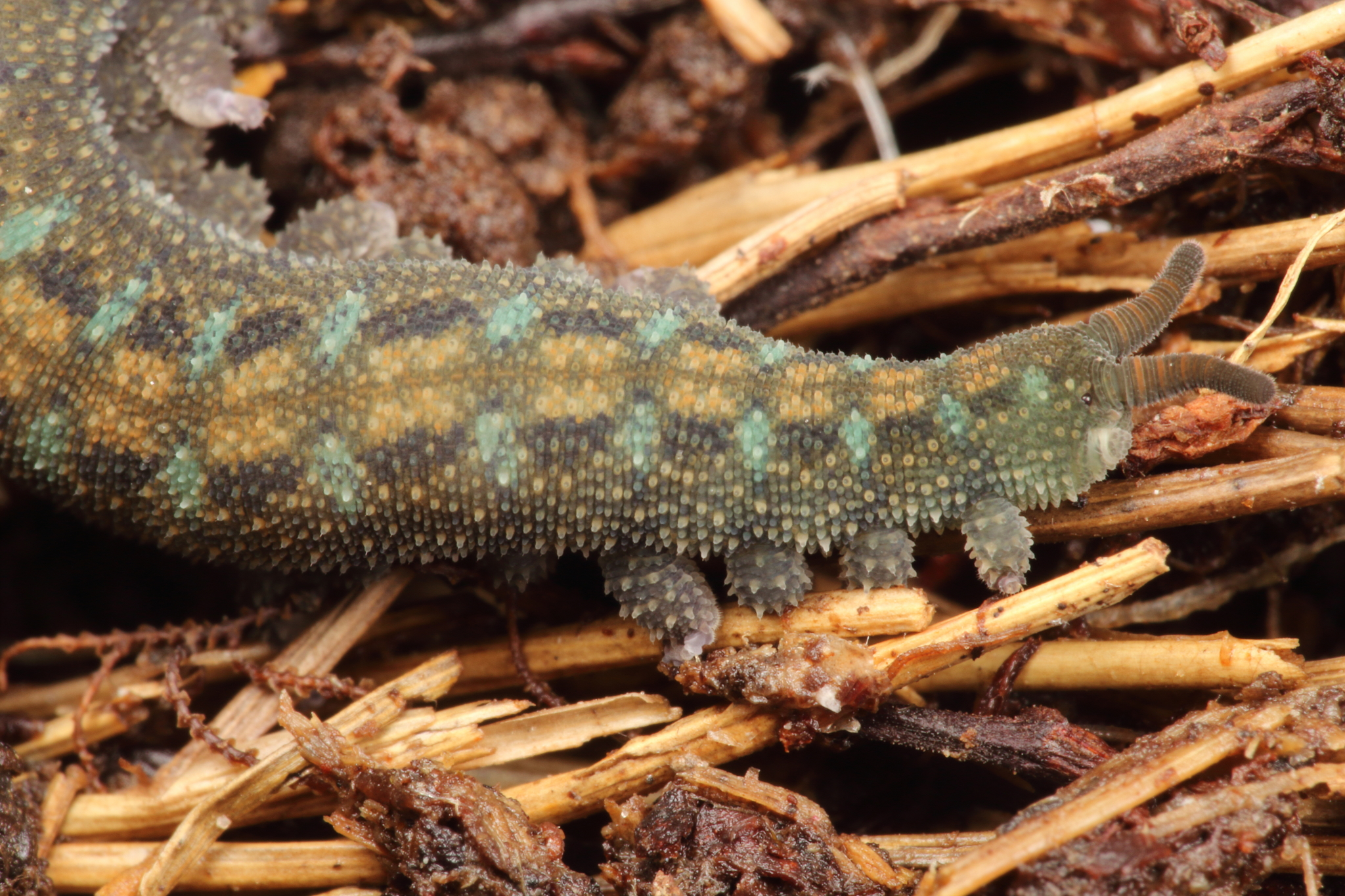
Dermal papillae on the peripatopsid velvet worm Ooperipatellus viridimaculatus

Dermal papillae are small protrusions on the cuticle of onychophorans, a group of animals commonly known as velvet worms. These structures give the group their common name, as they have a velvet-like feel when touched. Dermal papillae come multiple forms and cover the body of onychophorans in rings known as annulations.

== Types ==
=== Primary papillae ===
Talk about structure and make a diagram showing differences between Peripatidae and Peripatopsidae primary papillae

- when found on distal part of foot known as distal papillae
- when found on basal part of foot known as basal papillae
- scale ranks are responsible for velvety feel

=== Type 1 sensilla ===
Type 1 sensilla are a specialized variant of primary papilla with a prominent apical piece covered in scales and a sensory bristle with a textured base. These papillae act as mechanoreceptors, giving the animals a sense of touch, and occur in peripatid velvet worms.

=== Type 2 sensilla ===
Type 1 sensilla are similar to type 1 sensilla but lack an apical piece and have a far longer bristle.

=== Spindle-shaped sensilla ===
Spindle-shaped sensilla are a modified version of Type 1 sensilla that have a large, spindle-shaped apical piece and a short, thorn-like bristle. Like regular type 1 sensilla, these also only occur in peripatid velvet worms. In life, spindle-shaped sensilla make up an array known as the antennal sensory field. This is located on the underside of the antennae on its proximal (closer to the base) portion.

=== Accessory papillae ===
Crater shaped papillae

- crater shaped papillae in Neopatida have a rudimentary apical piece, while those in basal Asian clade do not
