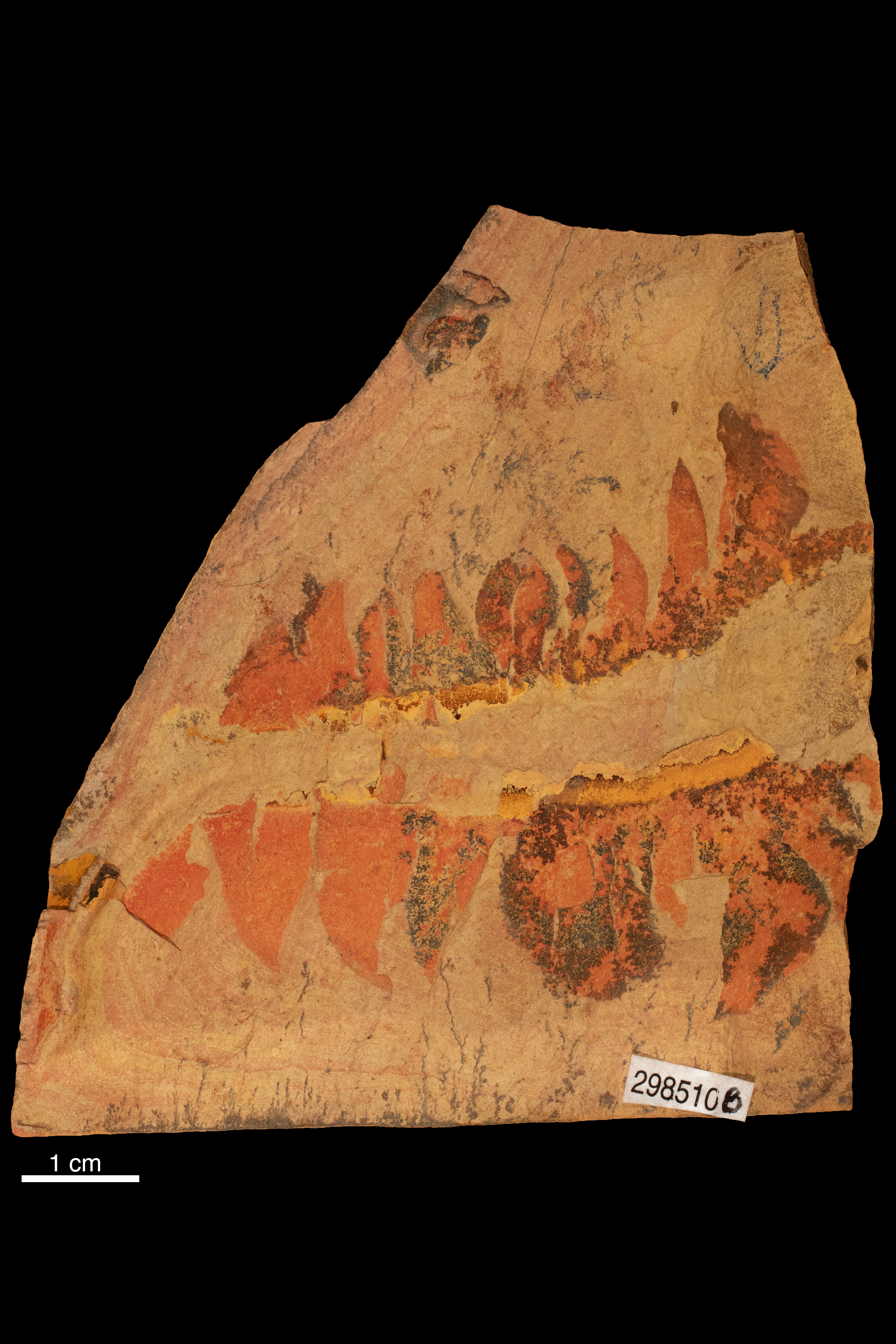
- Fossil holotype
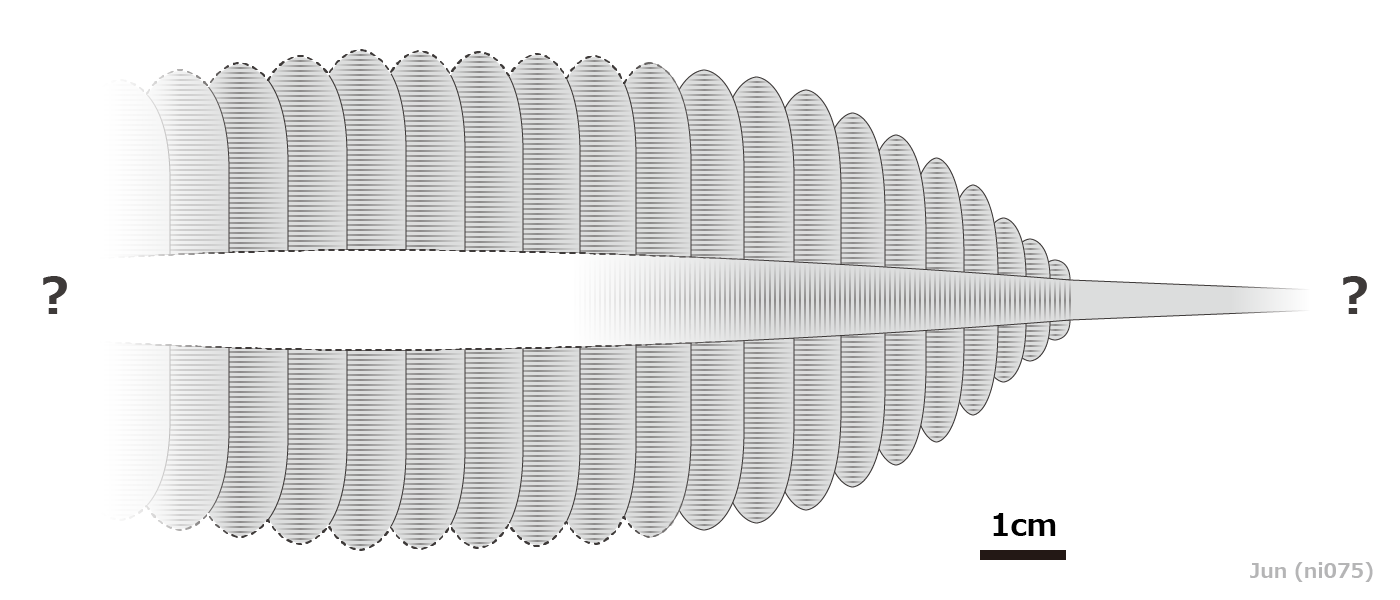
- Diagrammatic reconstruction

Scientific classification
- Kingdom: Animalia
- Stem group: Arthropoda
- Class: †Dinocaridida
- Family: †Kerygmachelidae
- Genus: †Mobulavermis; McCall, 2023

Type species
- †Mobulavermis adustus Christian R. A. McCall, 2023

= Mobulavermis =

Mobulavermis Temporal range: Cambrian Stage 4, 514–509 Ma

Genus of kerygmachelid lobopodian from the Middle Cambrian

Mobulavermis (/ˌmɒbjuləˈvɜːrmɪs/) (meaning "Mobula worm") is an extinct genus of Cambrian kerygmachelid lobopodian from the Pioche Shale, the Combined Metals Member of the Pioche Formation in Nevada; USA. The type species is M. adustus, known from the holotype and paratype.

== Etymology ==
The generic name, Mobulavermis, comes from Mobula, the genus name of extant manta rays and devil rays. This draws comparison to the elongate flexible caudal spines and broad swimming flaps of Mobula rays, which resemble the outline of the new taxon. This is combined with the Latin 'vermis', which translates to "worm". The specific name, adustus, is a Latin word which can mean "burnt", "singed", or "sun-burnt". This is in reference to the dramatic yellow, red, and black coloration of the two known specimens, and to the arid conditions of the type locality.

== Description ==
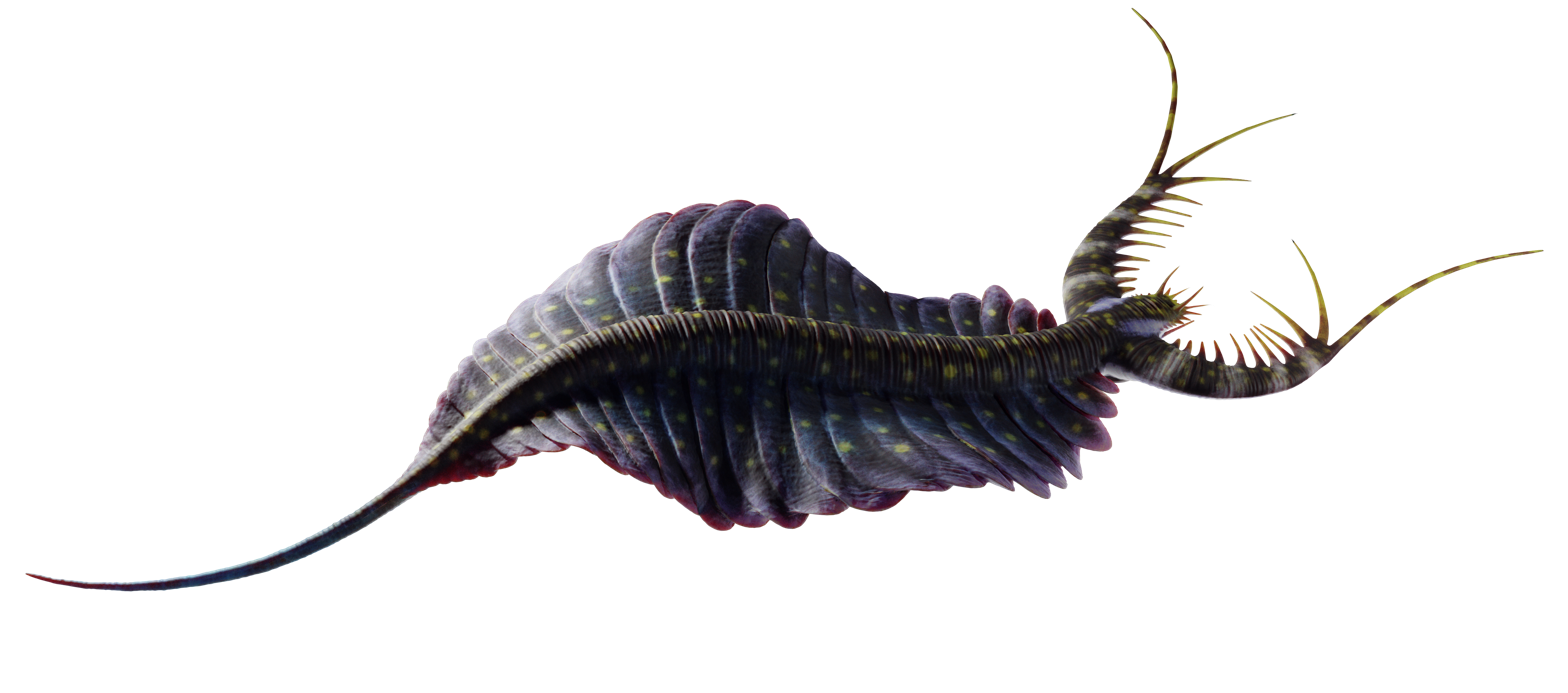
Life reconstruction with speculative head region based on Kerygmachela

Mobulavermis is known from two specimens which were described by McCall, (2023). The intact posterior region of the holotype, KUMIP 298510, measures around 80.60 mm (3.2 in) down the curve of the body. The paratype, KUMIP 298511, measures roughly ~50.7 mm (2.0 in) along the sagittal curve of the trunk, and is also an incomplete individual which preserves the posterior portion of the body, although traces of the trunk and flaps continue towards the anterior.

The trunk is unsclerotized, and lined with fine transverse annulations. A circular structure occurs beside the gut in the holotype - this may represent a digestive gland. It is described as having more lateral flaps than any other known lobopodian or radiodont; at least 18 down the length of the trunk, becoming smaller towards the caudal spine in an acuminate distribution. The posterior margins of the flaps are smooth and round, while the anterior margins appear flatter. The flaps were perhaps only weakly textured, in comparison to the wrinkled flaps of Kerygmachela. The caudal spine transitions smoothly from the trunk portion, apparently shorter and flexible than those of Kerygmachela.

Adult individuals may have reached between ~30 cm (11.8 in) and ~50 cm (19.7 in), based on complete specimens of Kerygmachela, making it large among Cambrian animals. It is thought to have been pelagic, feeding on small prey in the water column, with elongate compound eyes on the underside of the head, also inferred from Kerygmachela.

== Classification ==
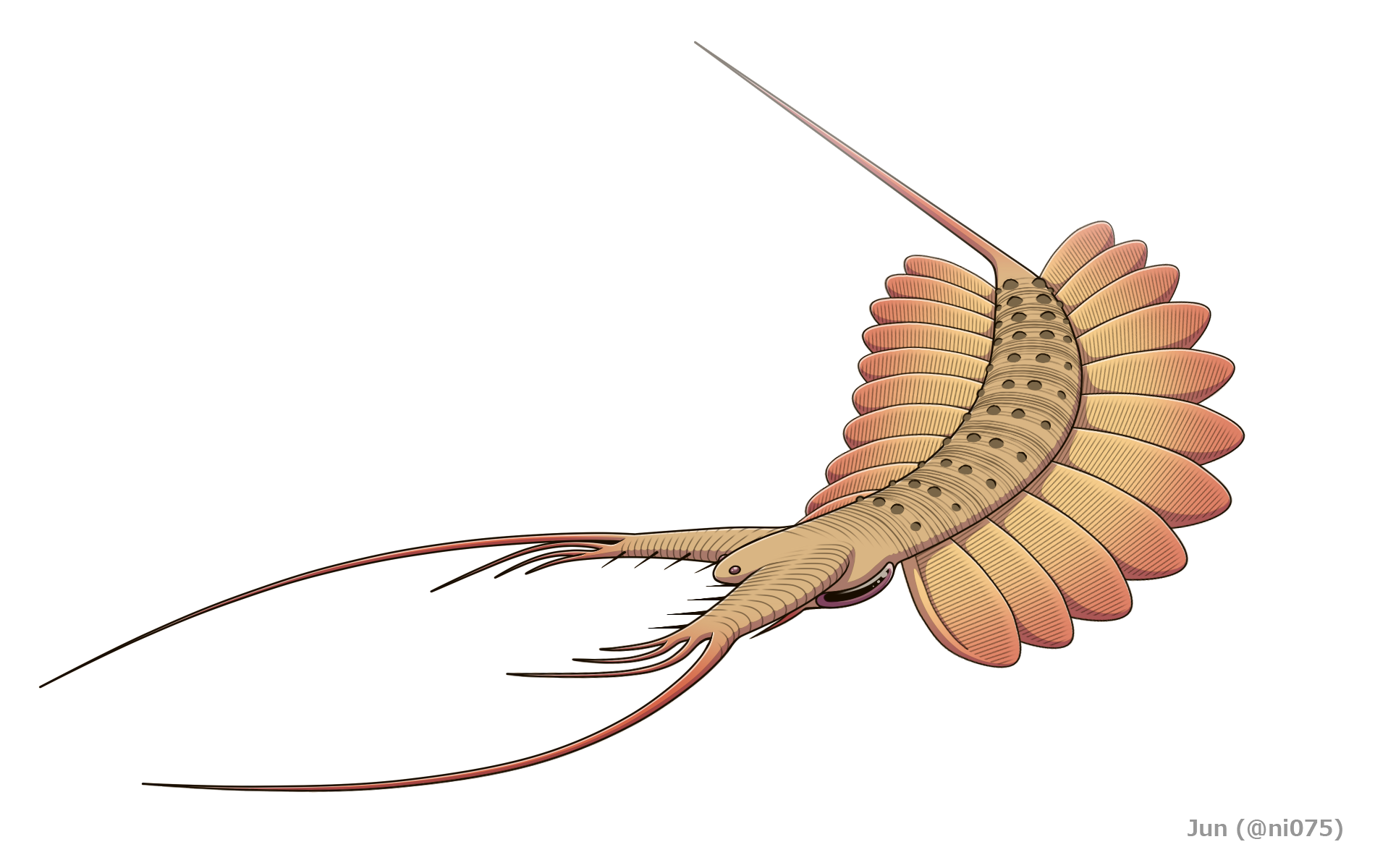
Reconstruction of Kerygmachela kierkegaardi, a close relative of Mobulavermis, following McCall (2023).

In his phylogenetic analysis, McCall, (2023) recovered Mobulavermis amongst the "gilled lobopodians" (Utahnax, and Kerygmachela). The paper also finds that "gilled lobopodians" form a monophyletic clade, Kerygmachelidae, which is also erected in the same paper, although had been used informally to refer to the group in lieu of an established clade name. Previously, it had been suggested that Kerygmachela and Utahnax may have evolved their lateral flaps independently from radiodonts, opabiniids, and Pambdelurion through a flattening of the walking lobopods of its ancestors, and that the lobopod limbs of Kerygmachela had been insufficiently demonstrated. The description of a new kerygmachelid that clearly lacked lobopodous legs appears to have confirmed this hypothesis. The following cladogram represents the phylogenetic results of a 50% majority rule consensus tree.

- Total group Euarthropoda
  - †Siberiidae
    - †Siberion
    - †Megadictyon
    - †Jianshanopodia
  - - †Kerygmachelidae
      - †Utahnax
      - - †Kerygmachela
        - † Mobulavermis
    - - - †Omnidens
        - †Pambdelurion
      - - †Opabiniidae
        - - †Caryosyntrips
          - - †Radiodonta (e.g. Anomalocaris)
            - - Deuteropoda (modern arthropods)
