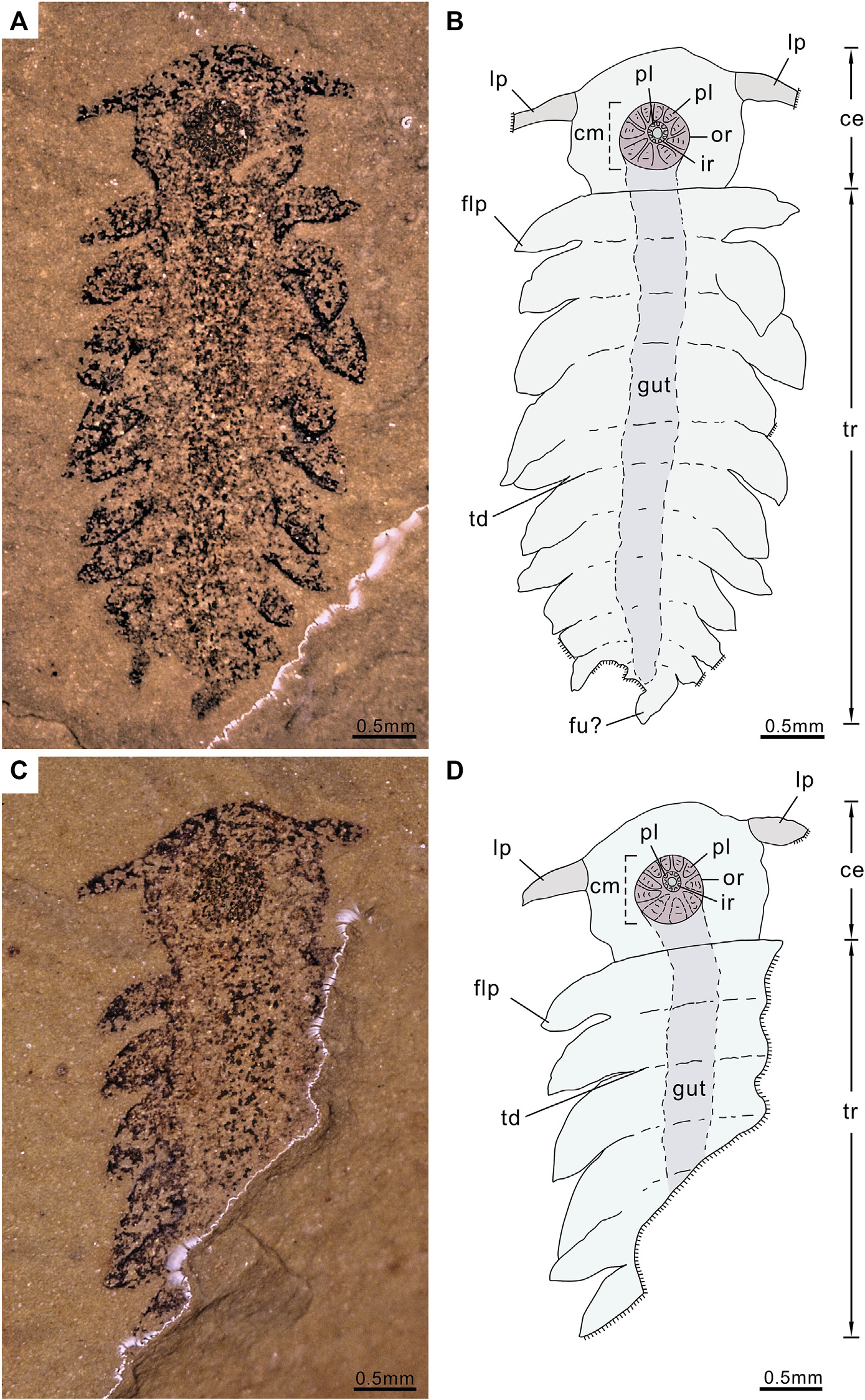
- Holotype specimen

Scientific classification
- Kingdom: Animalia
- Superphylum: Ecdysozoa
- Clade: Panarthropoda
- Genus: †Parvibellus
- Species: †P. atavus

Binomial name
- †Parvibellus atavus Liu et al. 2022

= Parvibellus =

Parvibellus Temporal range: Cambrian Stage 3

Extinct Genus of Panarthropod

Parvibellus is an extinct genus of panarthropod animal known from the Cambrian of China. It is known from only a single species, P. atavus, found in the Cambrian Stage 3 aged Chengjiang Biota of Yunnan, China.

== Morphology ==
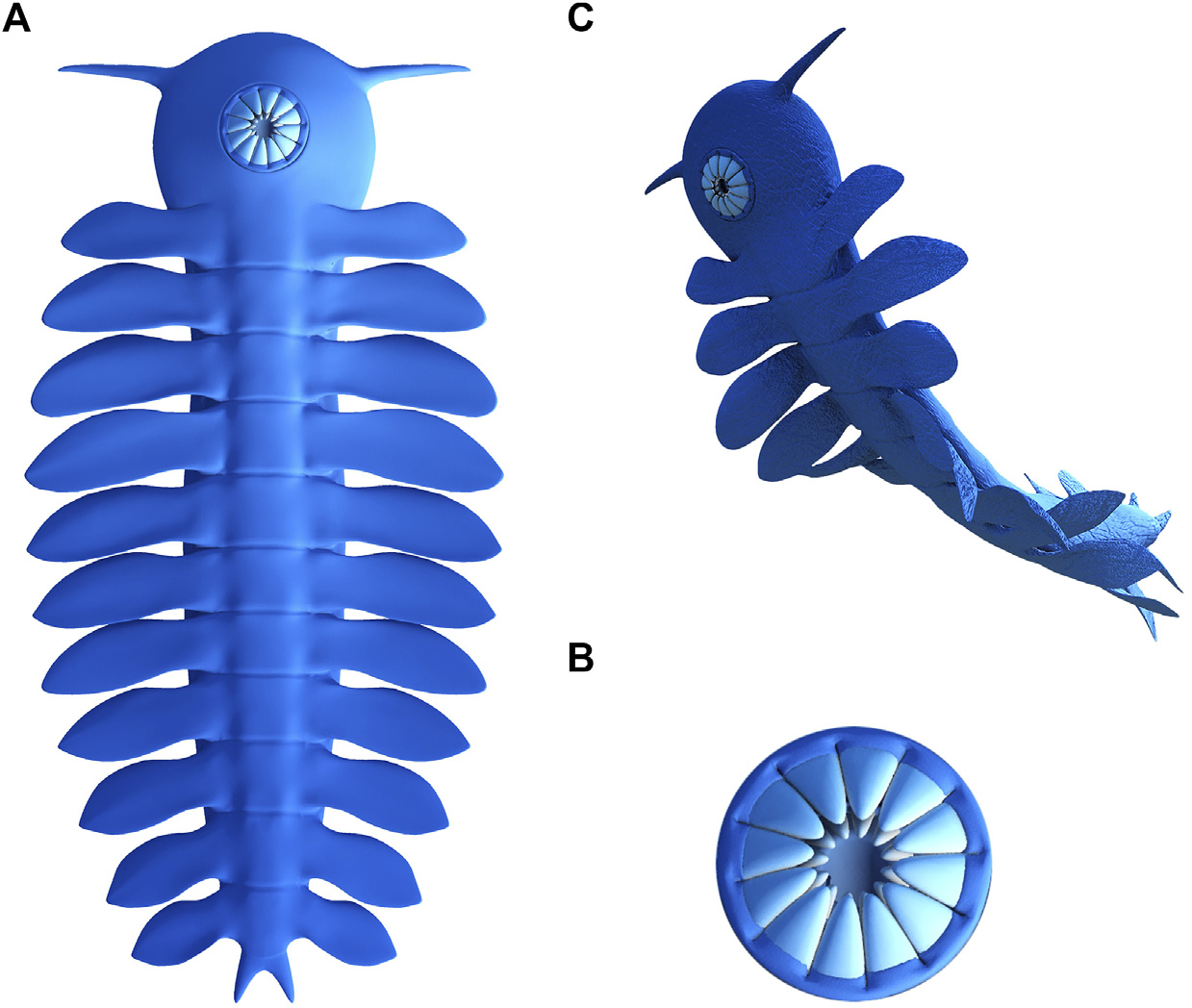
Reconstruction

Parvibellus is small panarthropod with length of around 5 mm (0.20 in). The head bore a pair of small frontal appendages and ventrally directed circular mouth. There is no evidence that Parvibellus had eyes. The elongated trunk possesses 11 pairs of lateral appendages and a pair of terminal projections.

In the original description, The trunk appendages were interpreted as swimming flaps, which suggest a nektonic life style and close relationship with stem-group arthropods such as the "gilled lobopodians" Kerygmachela and Pambdelurion, opabiniids and radiodonts. However, recent research suggests it may instead be a larval siberiid, a group of benthic lobopodians nested within arthropod stem-group, and the trunk appendages were re-interpreted as stout lobopods. Since it may represent the larva of any described siberiids from the same strata (e.g. Megadictyon, Jianshanopodia) and cannot be accurately identified, Parvibellus is considered to be a nomen dubium.
