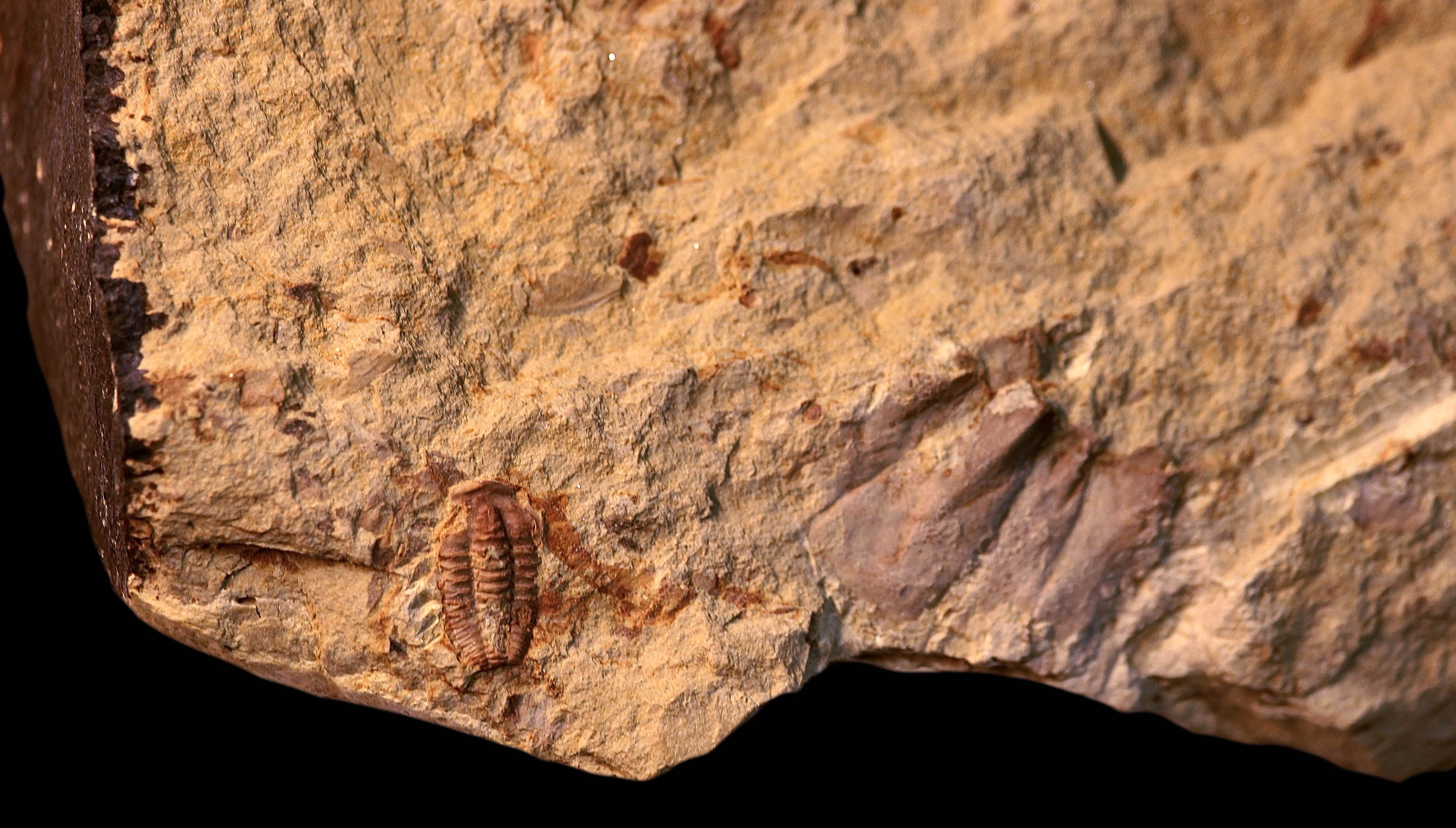
- A fossil of the partial mouth apparatus of Omnidens qiongqii? from the Xiaoshiba Lagerstätte of China, in association with a small trilobite.
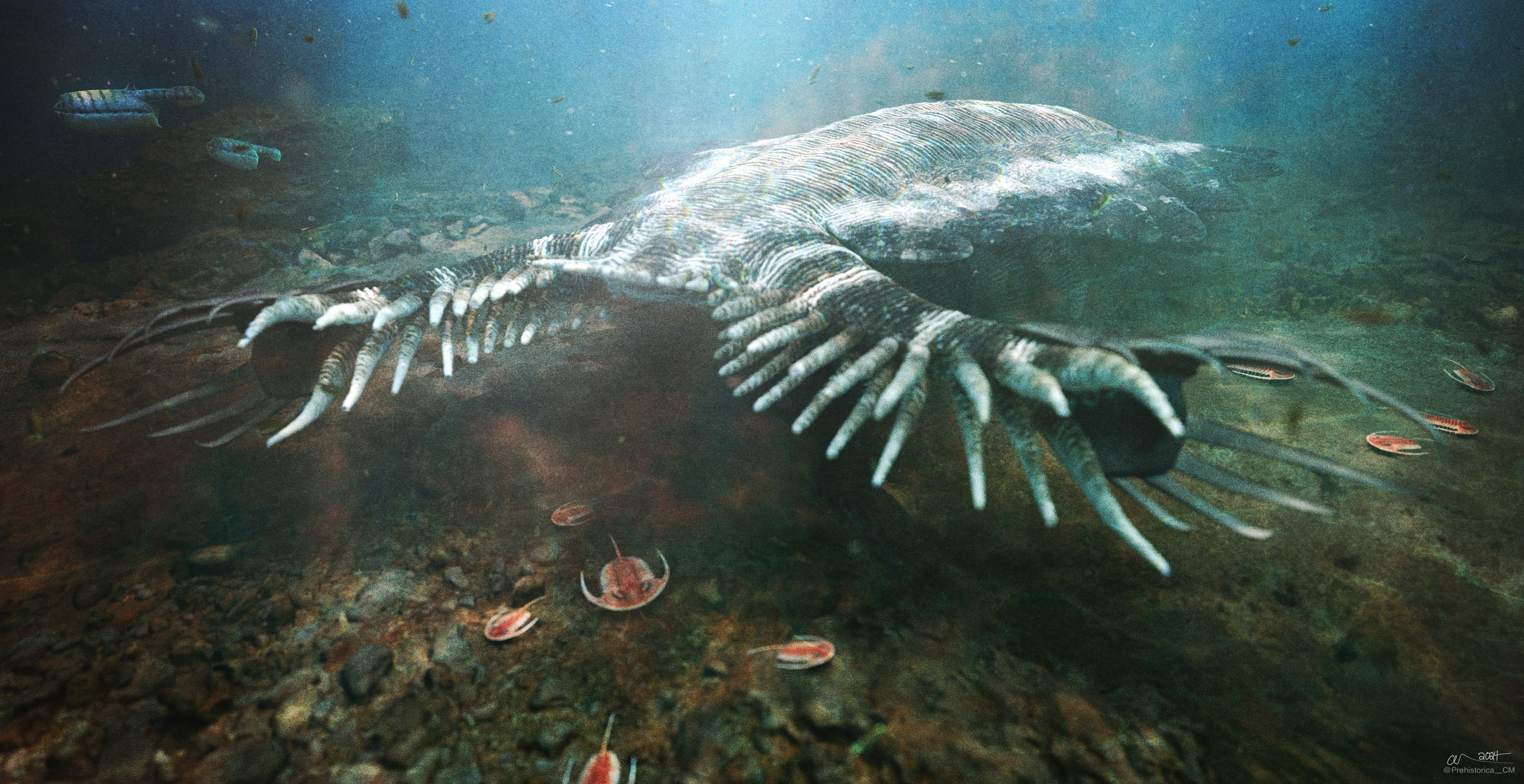
- Speculative reconstruction of Omnidens amplus from the Chengjiang Biota (possible cephalic sclerites omitted).

Scientific classification
- Kingdom: Animalia
- Stem group: Arthropoda
- Class: †Dinocaridida
- Genus: †Omnidens; Hou, Bergström & Yang, 2006

Type species
- Omnidens amplus Hou, Bergström & Yang, 2006

Species
- O. amplus Hou, Bergström & Yang, 2006; O. qiongqii? Li et al., 2024

= Omnidens =

Omnidens Temporal range: 518–514 Ma

Extinct genus of Cambrian animals

Omnidens, meaning "all-tooth", is an extinct genus of large Cambrian panarthropod known only from a series of large mouth apparatus and sclerotized talon-like structures, originally mistaken as the mouthparts of anomalocaridids. When first named, it was interpreted as a giant priapulid, but is now considered a panarthropod. Its mouth apparatus closely resembles that of the smaller gilled lobopodian Pambdelurion, indicating it is likely to have been a close relative of that species. With a maximum estimated body length of 1.5 metres (4.9 ft), Omnidens is suggested to have been the largest known free-living Cambrian organism and likely apex predator. Omnidens fossils are found in the Maotianshan Shales in the Yunnan Province of southern China, and are especially abundant from the slightly younger Xiaoshiba Lagerstätte locality.

== History ==
The first-described specimen of Omnidens was first described in 1994. At the time, it was interpreted as the oral cone of an anomalocaridid, and it was used as evidence to claim that anomalocaridids could reach a maximum body length of up to 2 meters (6.6 ft). Omnidens fossils were later described as specimens of Peytoia and Parapeytoia until finally being recognized as a distinct species in 2006 and named Omnidens amplus. At this time, it was reinterpreted as a gigantic priapulid, at least 1 metre (3.3 ft) long, far exceeding most known priapulids in size. Its specific name, amplus, means "large" or "giant". Omnidens was later identified as a close relative of the "gilled lobopodian" Pambdelurion. In 2024, additional remains were described from Xiaoshiba Lagerstätte, which were proposed as a new species, O. qionqii, after the mythical, man-eating Qiongqi, one of four ancient creatures in Chinese mythology, whose name means "distressingly strange". The validity of this new species was later questioned, as all specimens which remained identified as O. amplus lacked a narrowed plate, and none possessed an additional complete pair of plates for the claimed total of 14, the two primary diagnostic characters for O. qiongqii. A modification of the mouth interpretation was also given, arguing that the mouth included an unpaired "median plate" at the anterior of the mouth, which explained the occurrence of an additional, unpaired tooth in some fossils. The remaining diagnostic characters were also disputed, including the strict alignment of the inner teeth into columns; this trait was also not demonstrated as unique to one species over the other. The original authors responded, arguing that the existence of a median plate was unfounded, as it could not be identified in disarticulated specimens.

== Description ==
Estimated size of Omnidens compared to human and its close relative Pambdelurion

Omnidens is known primarily from large mouthparts, and more recently, distal portions of the frontal appendages. The preserved mouthparts would have formed a short muscular, potentially protrusible pharynx surrounded by circles of spiny sclerites, which were reminiscent of the scalids of priapulids, kinorhynchs, and loriciferans. The inside of the pharynx was also lined with several rows of pharyngeal sclerites. Based on the large size of its preserved mouthparts, Omnidens is estimated to have reached a length of up to 1.5 metres (4.9 ft). Its overall appearance was likely similar to that of its close relative Pambdelurion. The mouth, unlike the oral cones of radiodonts, was arranged bilaterally, forming two laterally opposing sets of "jaws", composed of a number of tooth-plates, which are further divided into a basal plate and a nail-like spine. An unpaired "median plate" was possibly present anteriorly, with its own column of underlying pharyngeal teeth. The frontal appendages are known from their distal-most portions, which appear as wide, heavily sclerotized bases, bearing a bilaterally symmetrical series of long talons. Additionally, elements which may represent bilaterally symmtrical head carapaces, and a number of small setal-blade like structures, have been found associated with the mouthparts and talons.

== Classification ==
Omnidens is classified as a stem-group arthropod. And, due to the striking similarities in their unconventional mouthparts, Omnidens is consistently found as a sister-taxon to the "gilled lobopodian" Pambdelurion whittingtoni. Cladogram after McCall, 2023:

- Total group Euarthropoda
  - †Siberiidae
    - †Siberion
    - †Megadictyon
    - †Jianshanopodia
  - - †Kerygmachelidae
      - †Utahnax
      - - †Kerygmachela
        - † Mobulavermis
    - - - †Omnidens
        - †Pambdelurion
      - - †Opabiniidae
        - - †Caryosyntrips
          - - †Radiodonta (e.g. Anomalocaris)
            - - Deuteropoda (modern arthropods)

== Distribution ==
Omnidens is found in both the Chengjiang Biota and the Xiaoshiba Lagerstätte of China, putting their age at approximately 520 Ma, during Cambrian Stage 3. O. amplus and O. qiongqii are both known from the Chengjiang, but specimens identified as O. qiongqii are the only Omnidens species present at Xiaoshiba, where it is found in relative abundance (hundreds of specimens, primarily mouthparts). Pambdelurion, which has mouthparts nearly identical to those of Omnidens, is from the Sirius Passet Lagerstätte of Greenland.

== See also ==
- Paleobiota of the Maotianshan Shales
- Amplectobelua another giant panarthropod which could reach 90 cm (~3 ft) in length
