= Pioche Shale =

Sedimentary deposit containing fossils in Nevada, USA

- Stratigraphic range: Lower Cambrian–Middle Cambrian
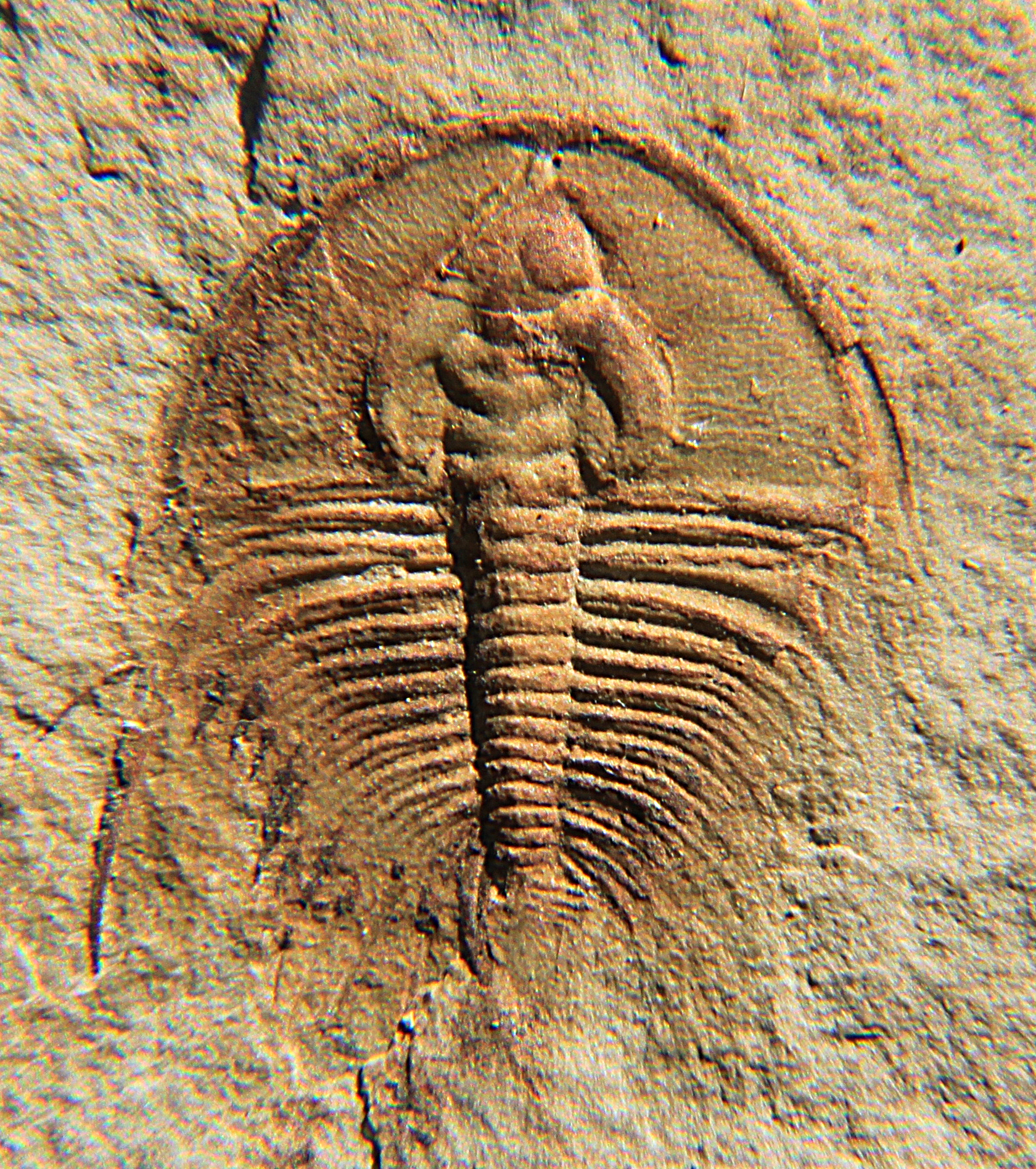
- Olenellus fowleri from the Pioche Shale
- Unit of: Pioche Formation

Location
- Country: United States

Type section
- Named by: Charles Doolittle Walcott, 1908

The Pioche Shale is an Early to Middle Cambrian Burgess shale-type Lagerstätte in Nevada. It spans the Early–Middle Cambrian boundary; fossils from the Early Cambrian are preserved in botryoidal hematite, whereas those from the Middle Cambrian are preserved in the more familiar carbon films, and very reminiscent of the Chengjiang County preservation.

It preserves arthropods and worms familiar from the Burgess Shale and the kerygmachelid Mobulavermis was described from fossils found in the Pioche Shale in December 2023.

It spans the early Cambrian Olenellus and basal Middle Cambrian Eokochaspis nodosa trilobite zones.

The eastern version of this shale can be found eastwards in Grand Canyon, as the Bright Angel Shale.
