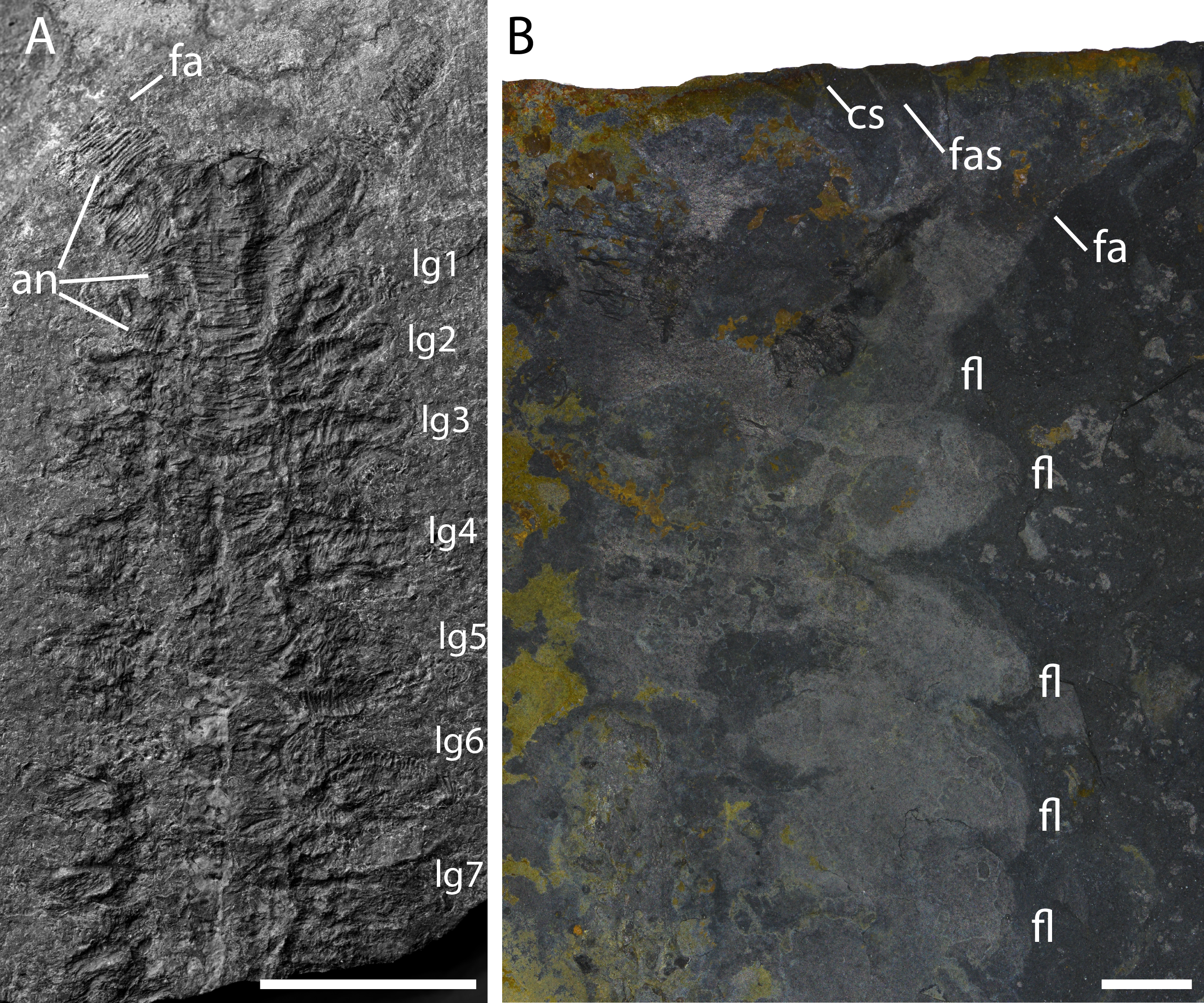
- Fossil specimens
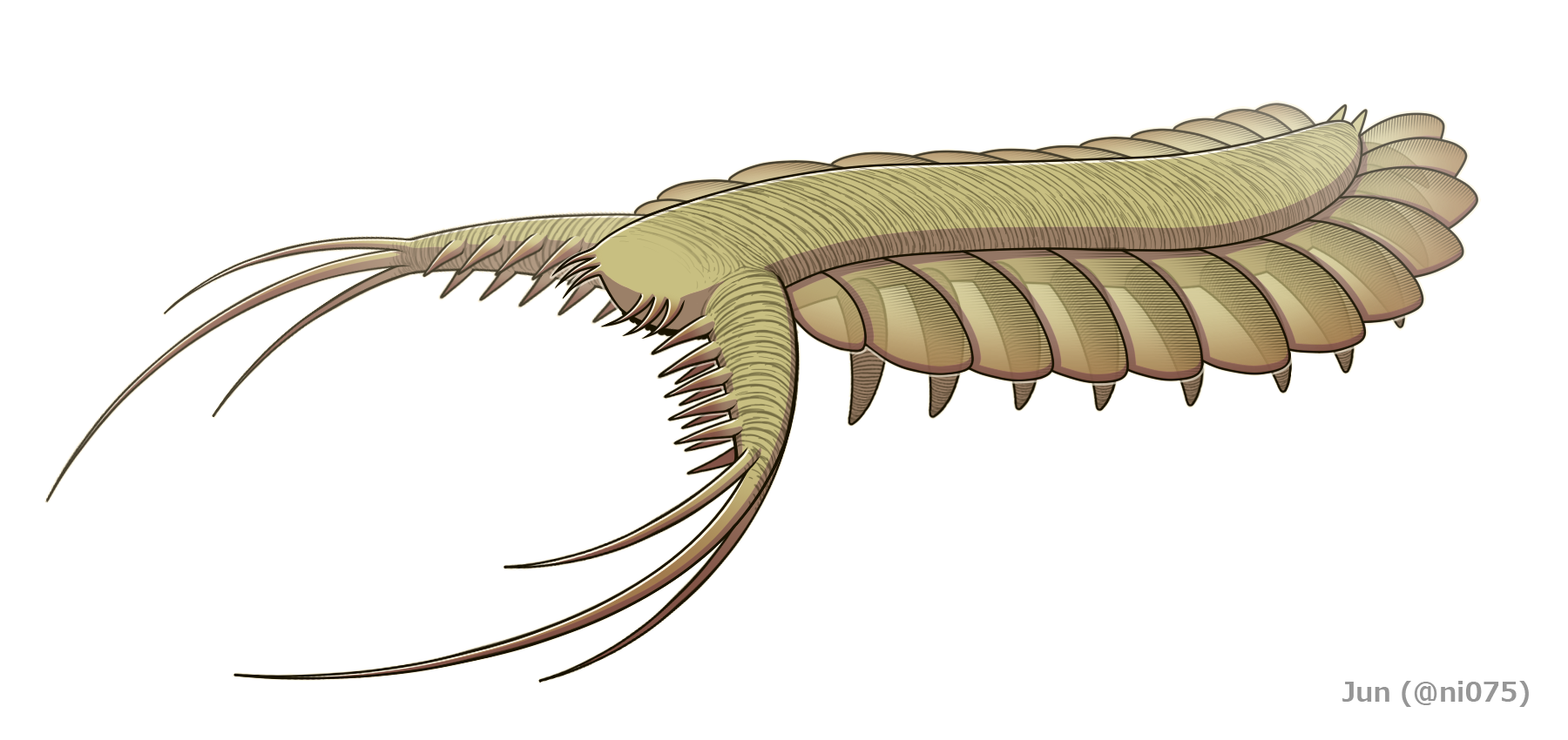
- Artistic reconstruction

Scientific classification
- Kingdom: Animalia
- Stem group: Arthropoda
- Class: †Dinocaridida
- Genus: †Pambdelurion; Budd, 1997
- Species: †P. whittingtoni

Binomial name
- †Pambdelurion whittingtoni Budd, 1997

= Pambdelurion =

Pambdelurion Temporal range: Cambrian stage 3

Extinct genus of Arthropod

Pambdelurion is an extinct genus of panarthropod from the Cambrian aged Sirius Passet site in northern Greenland. Like the morphologically similar Kerygmachela from the same locality, Pambdelurion is thought to be closely related to arthropods, combining characteristics of "lobopodians" with those of primitive arthropods.

== History of study ==
Pambdelurion whittingtoni was named in 1997 by Graham E. Budd. The genus name comes from Greek pambdelyrion "all-loathsome" in reference to the fearsome appearance of the animal, and the specific name honors the paleontologist Harry B. Whittington. The holotype is MGUH 24508.

== Description ==
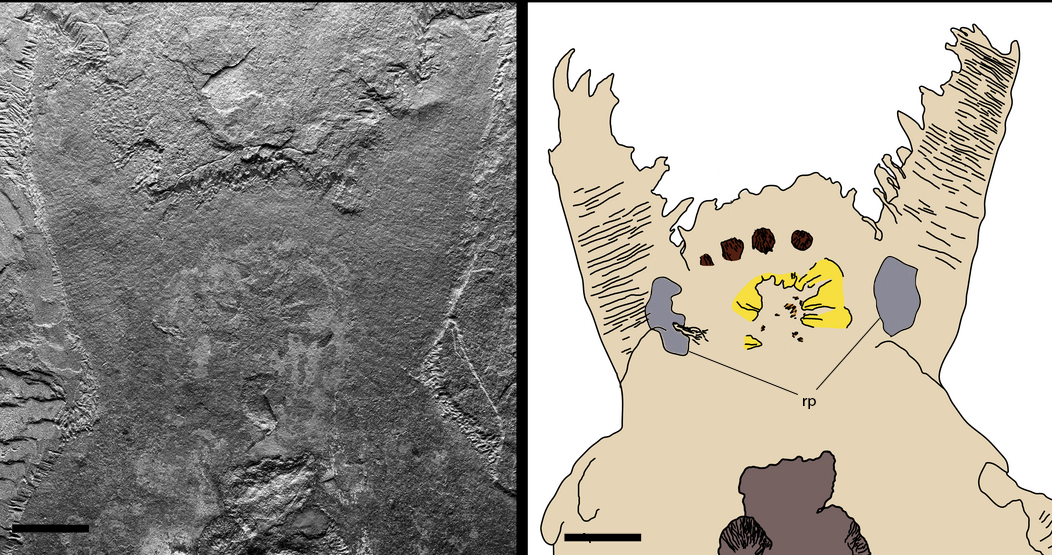
Specimen showing teeth, gut and possible eyes

Estimated size of largest known Pambdelurion compared to human and its larger, but fragmentarily known relative Omnidens

Pambdelurion was large for a Cambrian animal, and is estimated to have reached a length of 55 centimetres (22 in). Omnidens, an organism from China that closely resembles Pambdelurion and may even be synonymous with it, reached even larger sizes, estimated to be 1.5 metres (4.9 ft) based on the proportions of Pambdelurion.

The head of Pambdelurion bore a large pair of frontal appendages, homologous to the antennae of onychophorans and frontal appendages of radiodonts. These frontal appendages were weakly muscled and relatively soft, suggesting they may have served primarily as sensory organs, rather than for grasping prey. Between the appendages are a pair of clusters of three spines, which probably served a sensory function. Eyes had not been identified before, but some pointed that it would have had eyes similar to Kerygmachela. On the ventral surface of the head was the mouth, which was an oral cone similar to that of other non-arthropod ecdysozoans.

The body possessed eleven pairs of non-muscular, gill-bearing lateral flaps and eleven pairs of lobopodous legs ventral to the flaps. The body musculature was more similar to that of onychophorans than that of arthropods. The cuticle was unsclerotized.

The anterior portion of the gut was a large, muscular pharynx, as in many other ecdysozoans. More posteriorly, the gut contained paired glands.

== Paleobiology ==
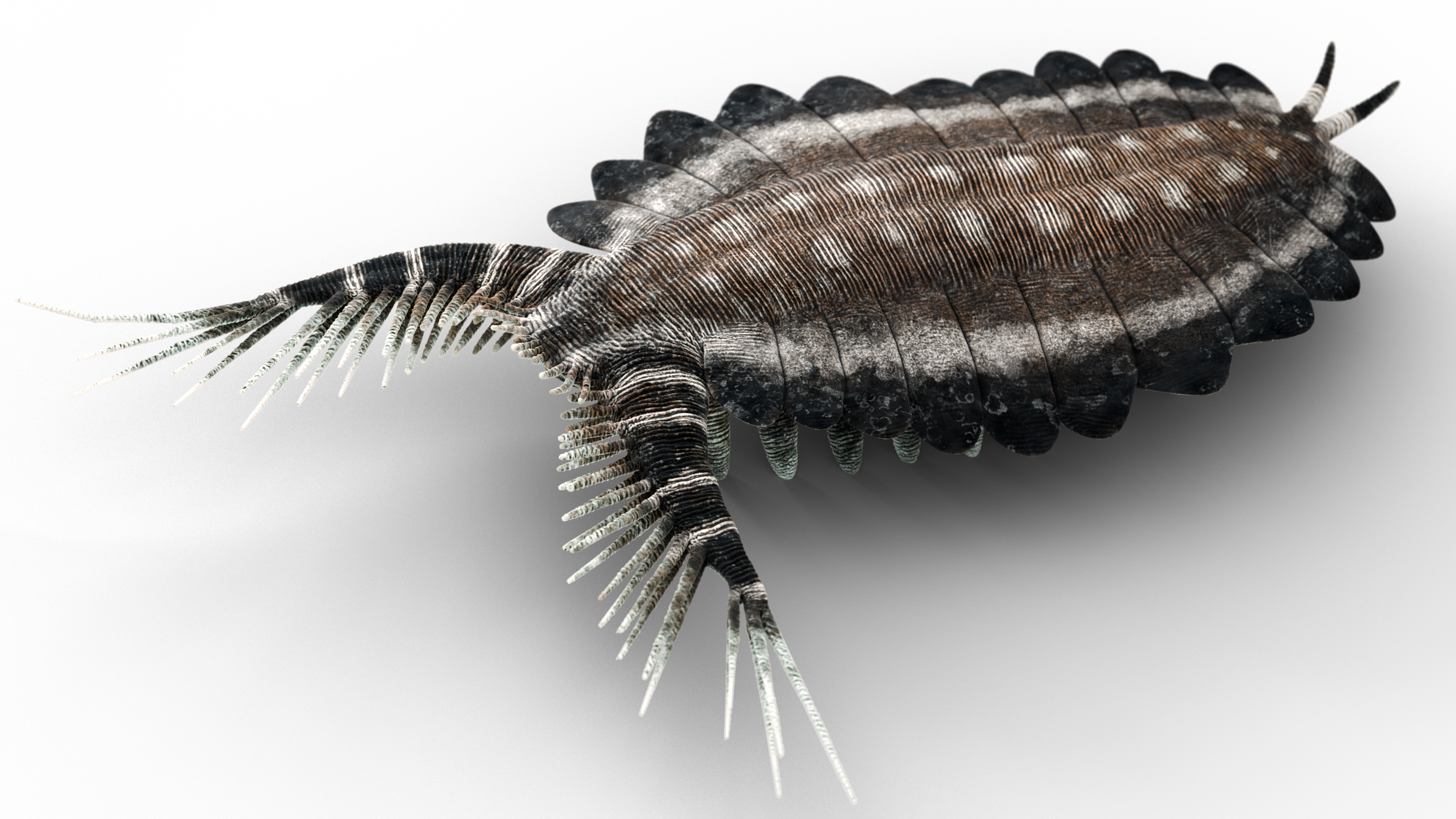
Photorealistic life reconstruction

Pambdelurion was probably a benthic (seafloor-living) predator, lacking the ability to swim, and with a diet including arthropods.

== Classification ==
Pambdelurion is regarded as a member of Lobopodia, a paraphyletic group of panarthropods that includes the ancestors of modern tardigrades, onychophorans, and arthropods. It is more closely related to arthropods than to any other modern group, but it diverged from the arthropod lineage before the last common ancestor of all modern arthropods; as such, it is a stem-group arthropod. Pambdelurion is part of a group of stem-arthropods known as the gilled lobopodians, which consists of lobopodians with gill-bearing lateral flaps and also includes Kerygmachela and Opabinia. The gilled lobopodians are the closest relatives of the arthropods among lobopodians, and both the radiodonts and true arthropods are descended from a gilled lobopodian ancestor.

Remains of Omnidens, primarily known from mouthparts found in the near-contemporaneous Maotianshan Shales of China, are extremely similar to those of Pambdelurion, suggesting they are closely related.

Cladogram after McCall 2023:

- Total group Euarthropoda
  - †Siberiidae
    - †Siberion
    - †Megadictyon
    - †Jianshanopodia
  - - †Kerygmachelidae
      - †Utahnax
      - - †Kerygmachela
        - † Mobulavermis
    - - - †Omnidens
        - †Pambdelurion
      - - †Opabiniidae
        - - †Caryosyntrips
          - - †Radiodonta (e.g. Anomalocaris)
            - - Deuteropoda (modern arthropods)
