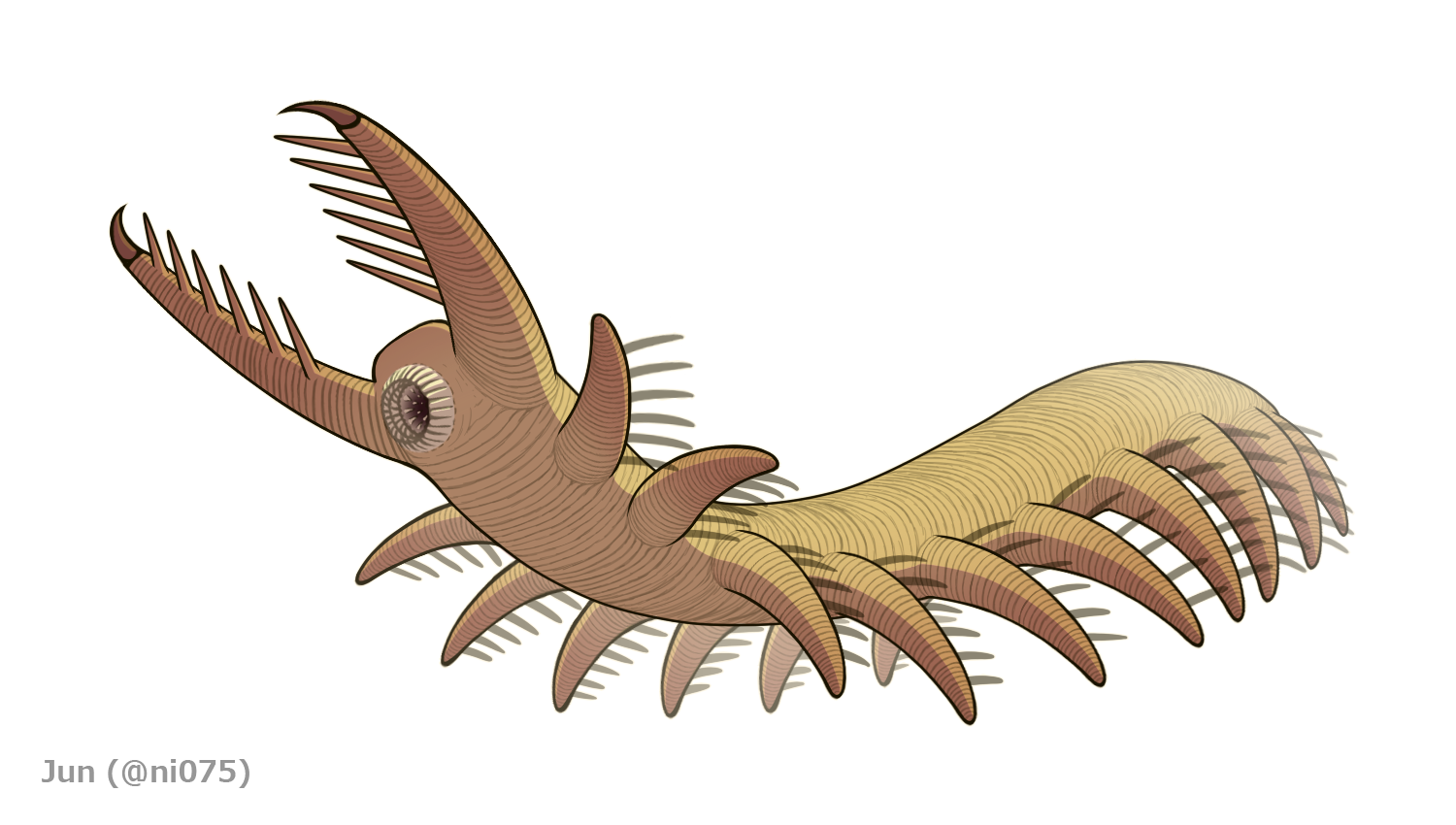
- Reconstruction of Megadictyon cf. haikouensis

Scientific classification
- Kingdom: Animalia
- Clade: Panarthropoda
- Phylum: †Lobopodia
- Family: †Siberiidae
- Genus: †Megadictyon; Luo & Hu, 1999
- Species: †M. haikouensis

Binomial name
- †Megadictyon haikouensis Luo & Hu, 1999

= Megadictyon =

Megadictyon Temporal range: Cambrian Stage 3

Extinct genus of Cambrian lobopodian

Megadictyon is a genus of Cambrian lobopodian known from the Chengjiang biota of China. It closely resembles Jianshanopodia and Siberion, with which it has often been placed in the family Siberiidae. The name of the genus is occasionally mis-spelt as Magadictyon.

== Description ==
Megadictyon is a large lobopodian, with a body length (excluding appendages) possibly up to 20 centimetres (7.9 in) in total. The head has a pair of robust frontal appendages associated with rows of spines and terminal claws. Located on the underside of the head is a radiodont-like mouthpart formed by multiple layers of plates and tooth-like structures. The trunk is wide and annulated, with a pair of well-developed lobopodous limbs on each body segment. Only 8 segment/limb pairs are countable in the incomplete fossil materials which are lacking the posterior region, so it may have had more (possibly up to 11 to 13) in nature. It also has pairs of digestive glands similar to those of basal arthropods.

== Taxonomy and phylogeny ==
Megadictyon has often been placed in the family Siberiidae along with Jianshanopodia and Siberion, which in turn are thought to represent among the closest relatives of arthropods among lobopodians.

Phylogeny of Panarthropoda and lobopodians after Knetcht et al. 2025:

- †Diania
- - †Lenisambulatrix
  - - - †Paucipodia
      - - †Thanahita
        - - †Eoconchariidae
            - †Microdictyon
            - †Fusuchoncharium
            - †Quadratapora
          - - - †Xenusion
              - †Onychodictyon
            - - †Strictocorniculum
              - †Rhombocorniculum
              - †Orstenotubulus
              - †Carbotubulus
              - †Hallucigenia fortis
              - †Hallucigenia sparsa
              - - †Hallucigenia hongmeia
                - - †Cardiodictyon
                  - - Tardigrada
                    - †Luolishaniida
                      - - †Ovatiovermis
                        - †Facivermis
                      - - †Luolishania
                        - †Collinsovermidae
                          - †Acincocricus
                          - - †Collinsovermis
                            - - †Collinsium
                              - †Entothyreos
    - - †Aysheaiidae
        - †Aysheaia
        - - †Hadranax
          - †Palaeocampa
      - Antennopoda
        - - †Antennacanthopodia
          - Onychophora (velvet worms)
        - - †Siberiidae
            - †Siberion
            - †Megadictyon
            - †Jianshanopodia
          - - - †Pambdelurion
              - †Kerygmachelidae
            - - †Opabiniidae
              - - †Radiodonta (e.g. Anomalocaris)
                - Deuteropoda (modern arthropods)

Cladogram after McCall 2023:

- Total group Euarthropoda
  - †Siberiidae
    - †Siberion
    - †Megadictyon
    - †Jianshanopodia
  - - †Kerygmachelidae
      - †Utahnax
      - - †Kerygmachela
        - † Mobulavermis
    - - - †Omnidens
        - †Pambdelurion
      - - †Opabiniidae
        - - †Caryosyntrips
          - - †Radiodonta (e.g. Anomalocaris)
            - - Deuteropoda (modern arthropods)
