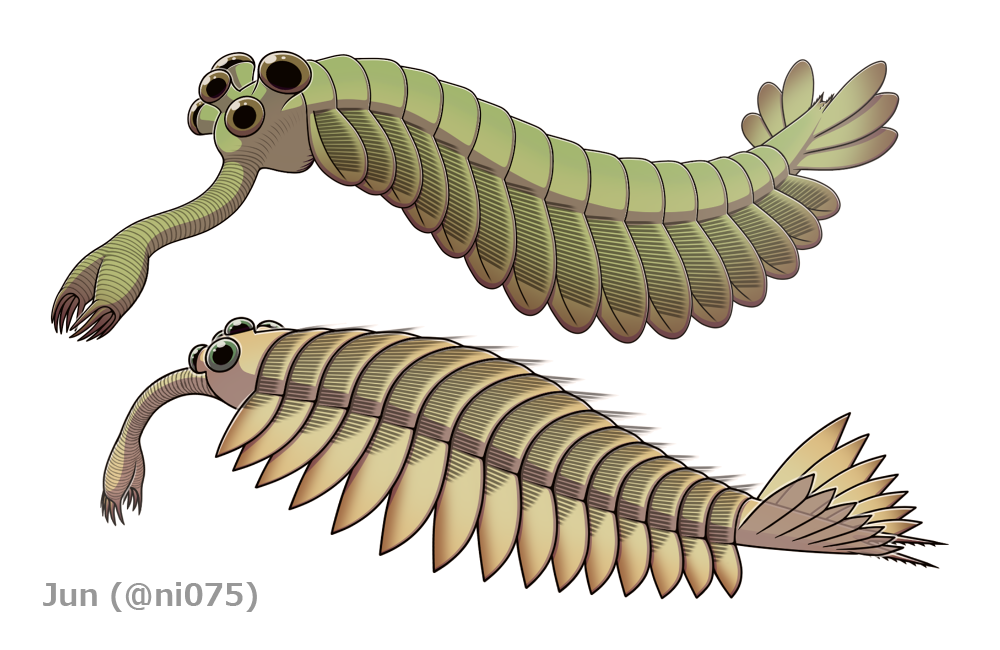
- Opabinia (top) and Utaurora (bottom)

Scientific classification
- Kingdom: Animalia
- Stem group: Arthropoda
- Class: †Dinocaridida
- Order: †Opabiniida
- Family: †Opabiniidae; Walcott, 1912

Genera
- †Opabinia; †Utaurora; †Mieridduryn; †Myoscolex?

= Opabiniidae =

Opabiniidae Temporal range: Middle Cambrian - Middle Ordovician, 507–462 Ma

Extinct family of basal arthropods

Opabiniidae is an extinct family of marine stem-arthropods. Its type and best-known genus is Opabinia. It also contains Utaurora, and Mieridduryn. Opabiniids closely resemble radiodonts, but their frontal appendages were basally fused into a proboscis. Opabiniids are also distinguishable from radiodonts by setal blades covering at least part of the body flaps and serrated caudal rami.

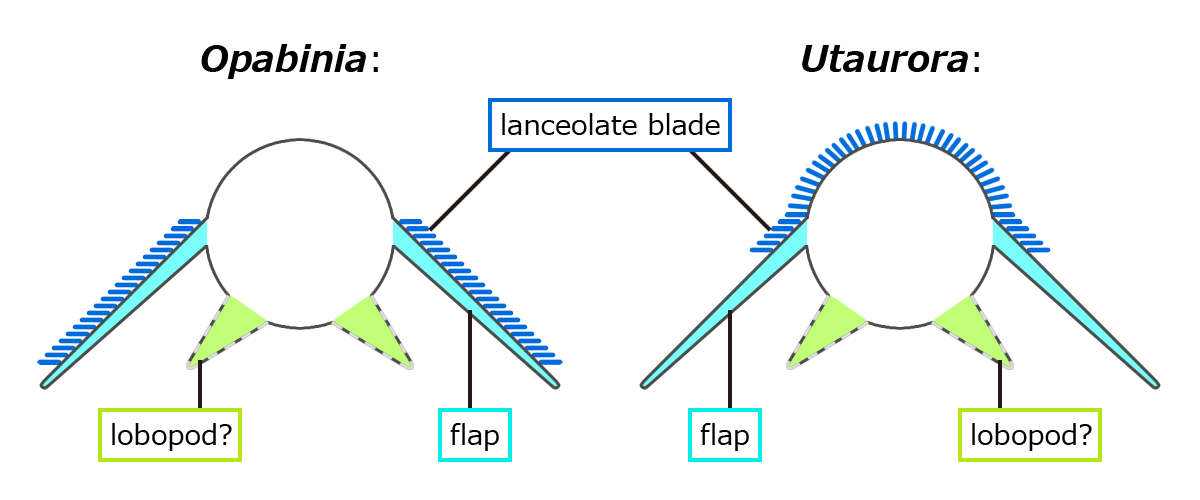
Cross section of the trunk of Utaurora and Opabinia

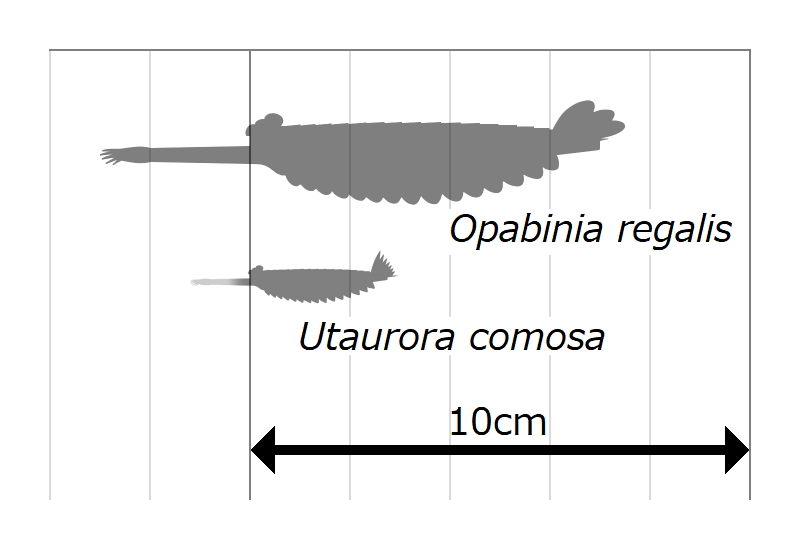
Size comparison of Utaurora and Opabinia

== History of study ==
Opabiniidae was named by Charles Doolittle Walcott in 1912, alongside its type species Opabinia. Walcott interpreted Opabiniidae as a family of anostracan crustaceans, most closely related to Thamnocephalidae. Opabinia was restudied in the 1970s, and reinterpreted as a stranger animal. Stephen Jay Gould referred to Opabinia as a "weird wonder", and an illustration of Opabinia prompted laughter when it was first revealed at a paleontological conference. In 2022, two more opabiniids were discovered, those being Utaurora and Mieridduryn.

Myoscolex from Emu Bay Shale is sometimes suggested to be an opabiniid, but morphological features supporting this interpretation are controversial.

== Phylogeny ==
Cladogram after McCall 2023:

- Total group Euarthropoda
  - †Siberiidae
    - †Siberion
    - †Megadictyon
    - †Jianshanopodia
  - - †Kerygmachelidae
      - †Utahnax
      - - †Kerygmachela
        - † Mobulavermis
    - - - †Omnidens
        - †Pambdelurion
      - - †Opabiniidae
        - - †Caryosyntrips
          - - †Radiodonta (e.g. Anomalocaris)
            - - Deuteropoda (modern arthropods)
