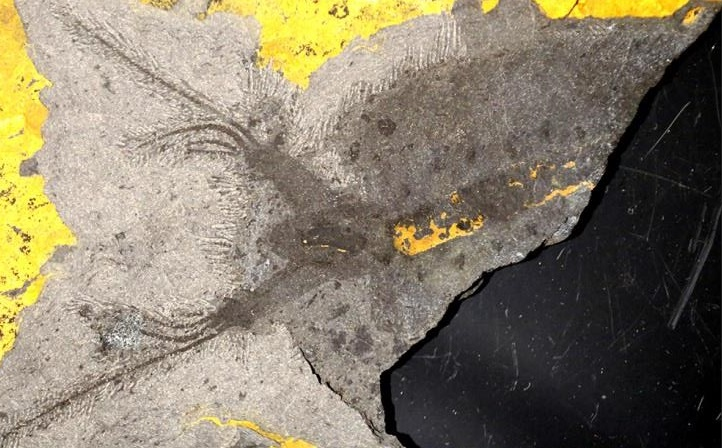
- Fossil of Kerygmachela kierkegaardi from the Sirius passet site
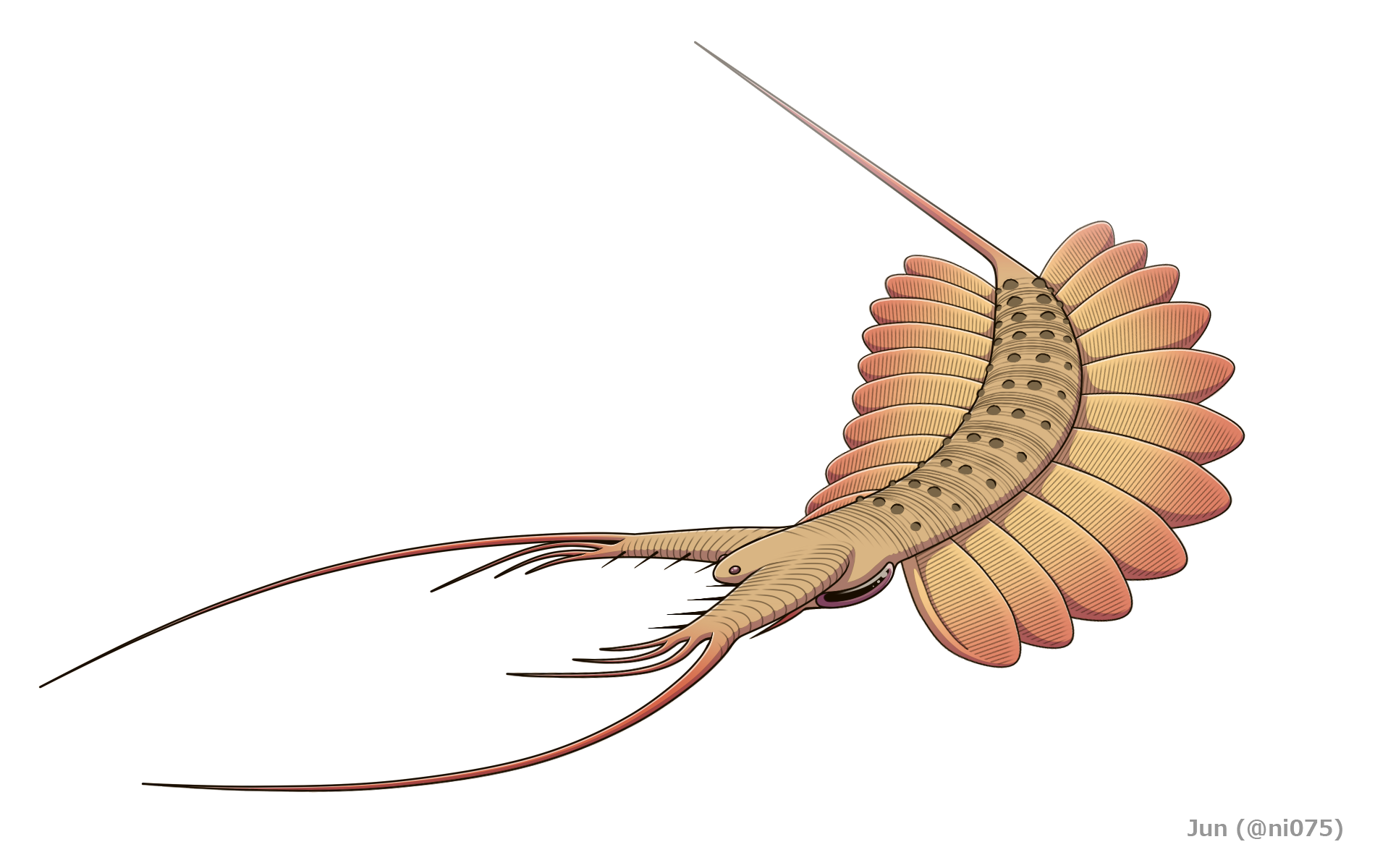
- Reconstruction of Kerygmachela kierkegaardi based on later observations.

Scientific classification
- Kingdom: Animalia
- Stem group: Arthropoda
- Class: †Dinocaridida
- Family: †Kerygmachelidae
- Genus: †Kerygmachela; Budd, 1993
- Species: †K. kierkegaardi

Binomial name
- †Kerygmachela kierkegaardi Budd, 1993

= Kerygmachela =

Kerygmachela Temporal range: Cambrian Stage 3

Extinct gilled lobopod

Kerygmachela kierkegaardi is a kerygmachelid gilled lobopodian from the Cambrian Stage 3 aged Sirius Passet Lagerstätte in northern Greenland. Its anatomy strongly suggests that it, along with its relative Pambdelurion whittingtoni, was a close relative of radiodonts (Anomalocaris and relatives) and euarthropods. The generic name "Kerygmachela" derives from the Greek words Kerygma (proclamation) and Chela (claw), in reference to the flamboyant frontal appendages. The specific name, "kierkegaardi" honors Danish philosopher Søren Kierkegaard.

== Morphology ==
Size of Kerygmachela compared to a human hand

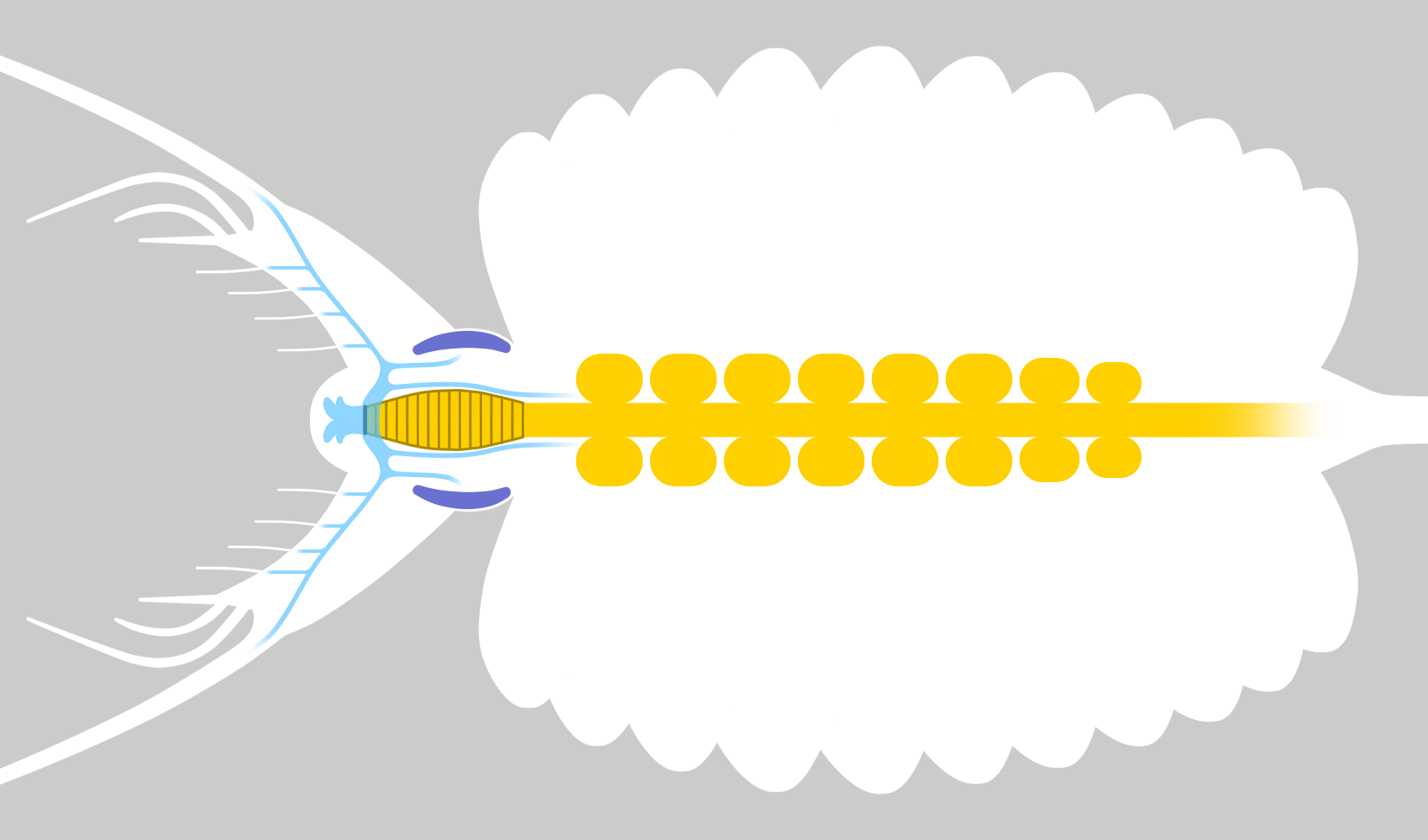
Eyes (deep blue), brain (light blue) and digestive system (yellow) of Kerygmachela.

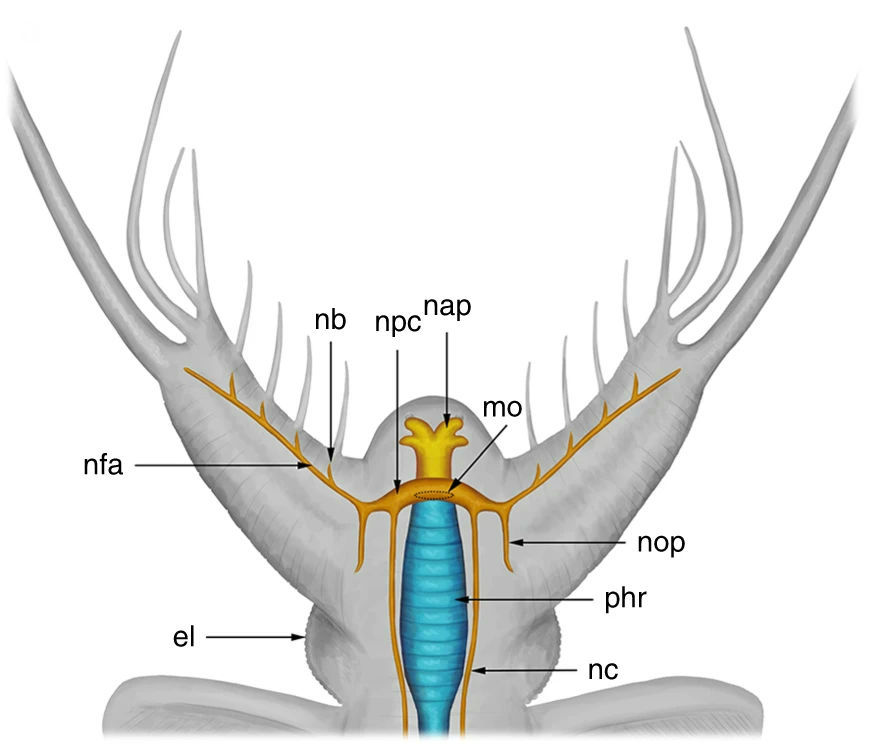
Closeup of the head, following a protocerebral interpretation. Key: el = eye lobe, mo = mouth opening, nap = anterior neural projection, nb = branching of nerve, nc = nerve cord, nfa = frontal appendage nervous tract, npc = protocerebrum, nop = optic nerve, phr = pharynx

The head of Kerygmachela possesses a pair of well-developed frontal appendages which correspond to those of other dinocaridids and siberiid lobopodians. Each of them terminates in a series of long spines. A pair of sessile, slit-like compound eyes is located slightly behind the base of these appendages. A small anterior-facing mouth is located below the head and bears a pair of stylet-like structures. The head also possesses a median lobe-like projection that carries a pair of small, possible ocular structures (median eye). The body is composed of 11 segments, each indicated by 4 dorsal turberculates associated with 11 pairs of lateral flaps with dorsal gill-like wrinkling. Initially, 11 pairs of small legs (lobopods) were thought to be evident just below the flaps, but later observations suggest the lopobods were most likely absent, and the flaps were originated from ancestral lopobods instead. The body ends with a single, stiff tail spine that was formerly thought to be a pair of segmented cerci.

Internally, Kerygmachela possesses a well-developed pharynx and a midgut with 8 pairs of arthropod-like digestive glands. The brain have ramified nerves extended to the median lobe, frontal appendages and eyes. Only the protocerebrum (the frontal-most cerebral ganglion) was evident from the brain region, thus all of the other head nerves were considered protocerebral. On the other hand, a subsequent study of radiodont Stanleycaris might suggest a deutocerebral origin for the frontal appendage nerves.

== Paleoecology ==
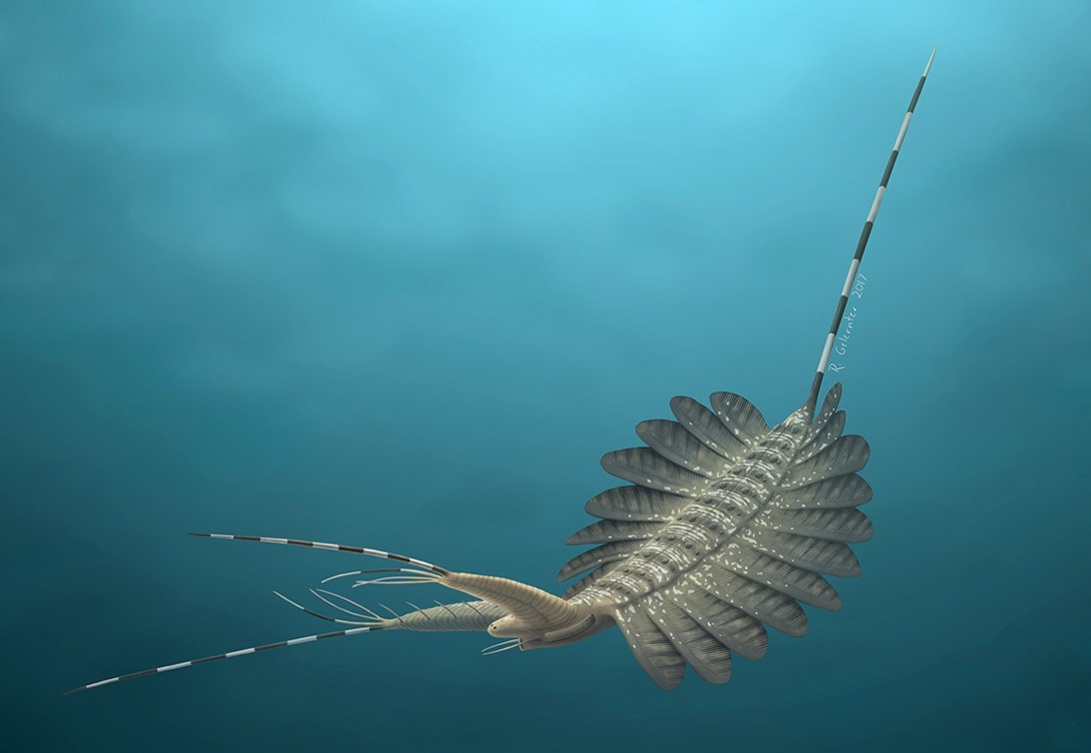
Life restoration of Kerygmachela swimming in open water

The absence of walking limbs suggests that Kerygmachela was a freely swimming (nektonic) predator, using the body flaps to swim, and the large frontal appendages to grasp prey.

== Phylogeny ==
After McCall 2023:

- Total group Euarthropoda
  - †Siberiidae
    - †Siberion
    - †Megadictyon
    - †Jianshanopodia
  - - †Kerygmachelidae
      - †Utahnax
      - - †Kerygmachela
        - † Mobulavermis
    - - - †Omnidens
        - †Pambdelurion
      - - †Opabiniidae
        - - †Caryosyntrips
          - - †Radiodonta (e.g. Anomalocaris)
            - - Deuteropoda (modern arthropods)
