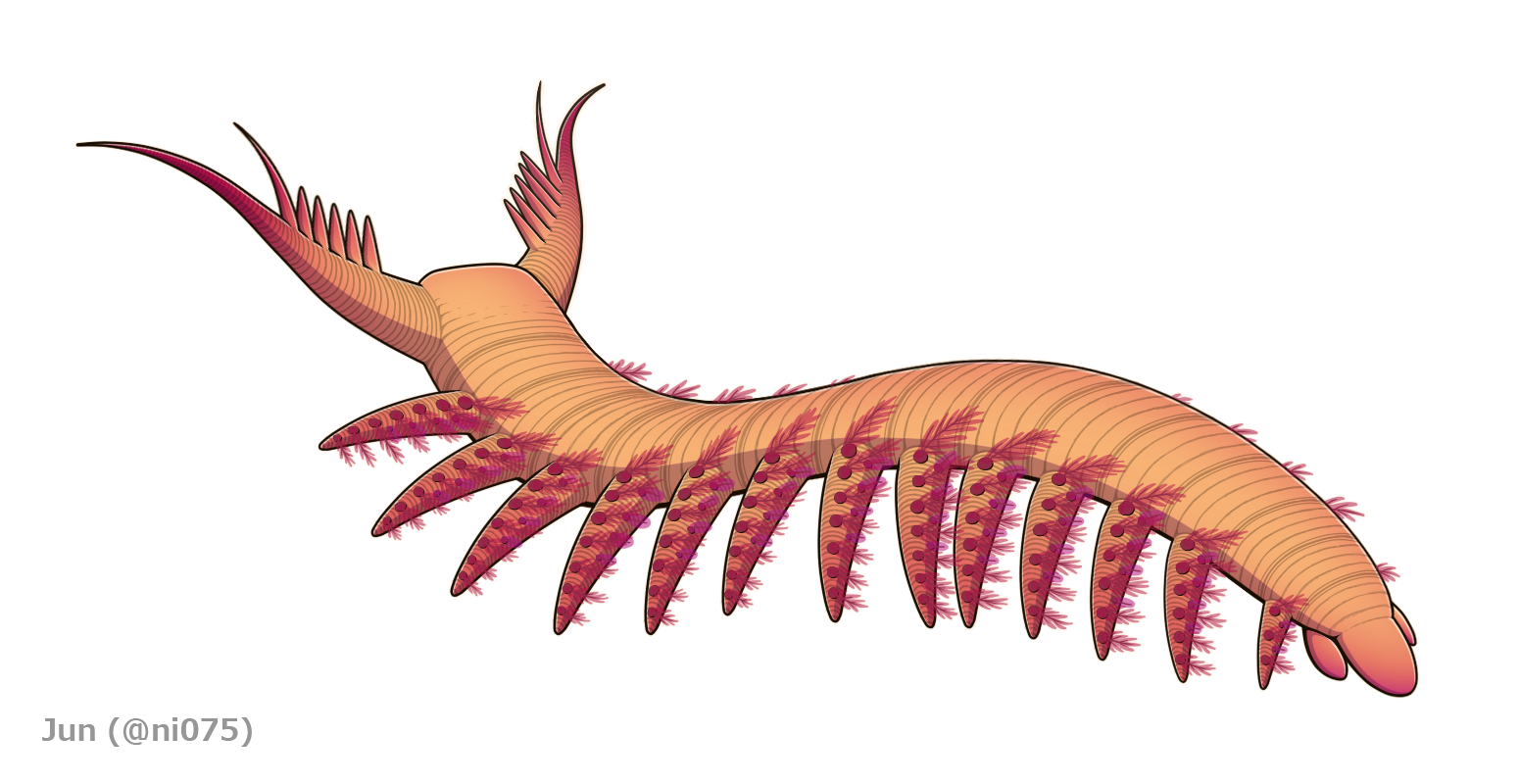
- Reconstruction of Jianshanopodia decora

Scientific classification
- Kingdom: Animalia
- Clade: Panarthropoda
- Phylum: †Lobopodia
- Class: †Xenusia
- Order: †Siberiida
- Family: †Siberiidae
- Genus: †Jianshanopodia; Liu et al., 2006
- Species: †J. decora

Binomial name
- †Jianshanopodia decora Liu et al., 2006

= Jianshanopodia =

Jianshanopodia Temporal range: Cambrian Stage 3

Extinct genus of Cambrian lobopodian

Jianshanopodia is a monotypic genus of Cambrian lobopodian, discovered in the Maotianshan Shales of Yunnan, China.

== Description ==
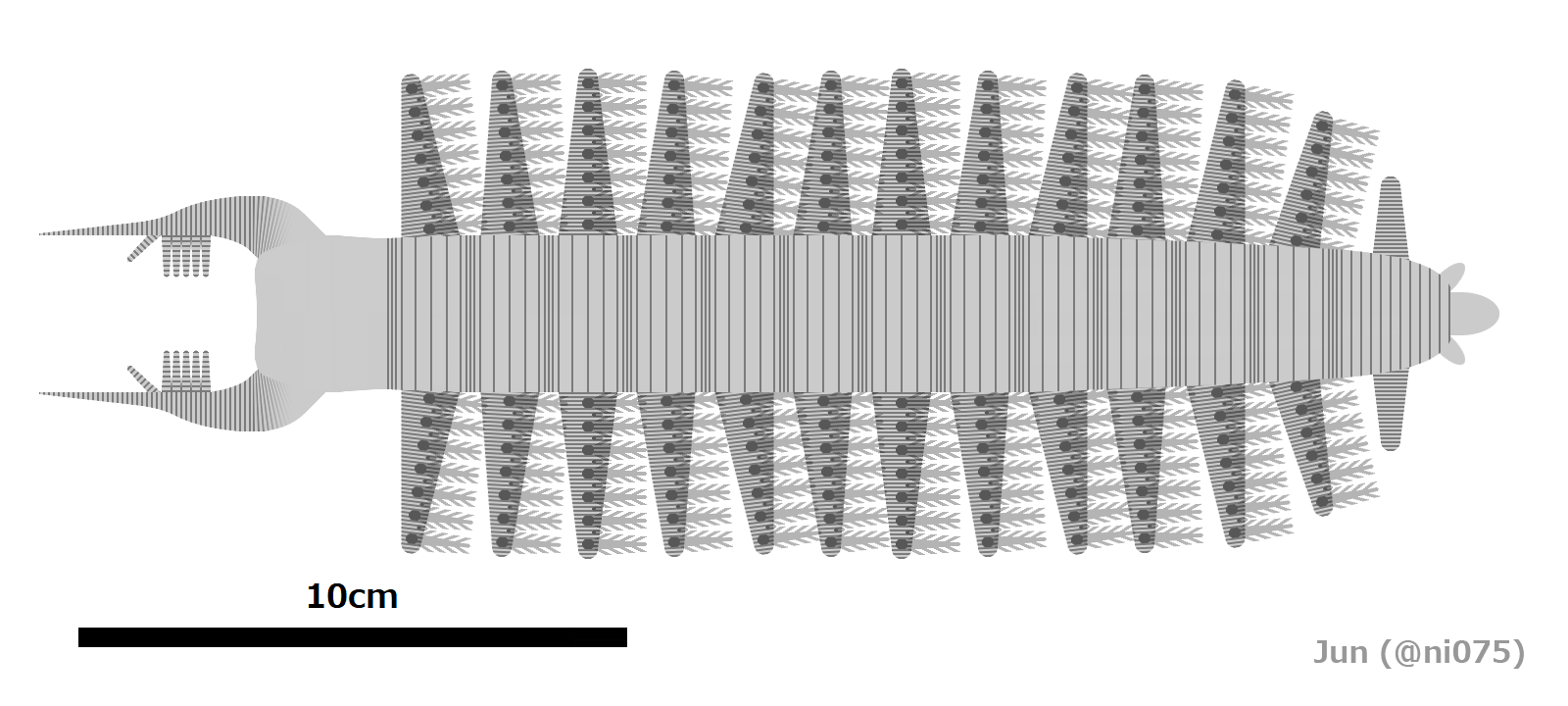
diagrammatic reconstruction

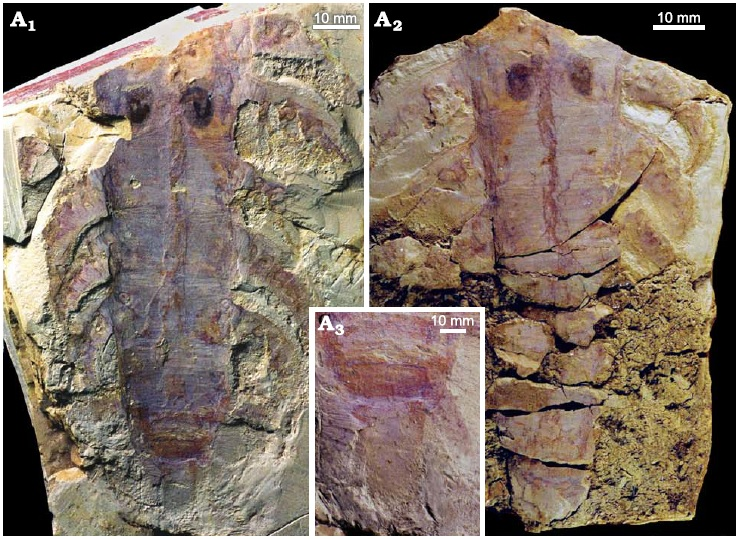
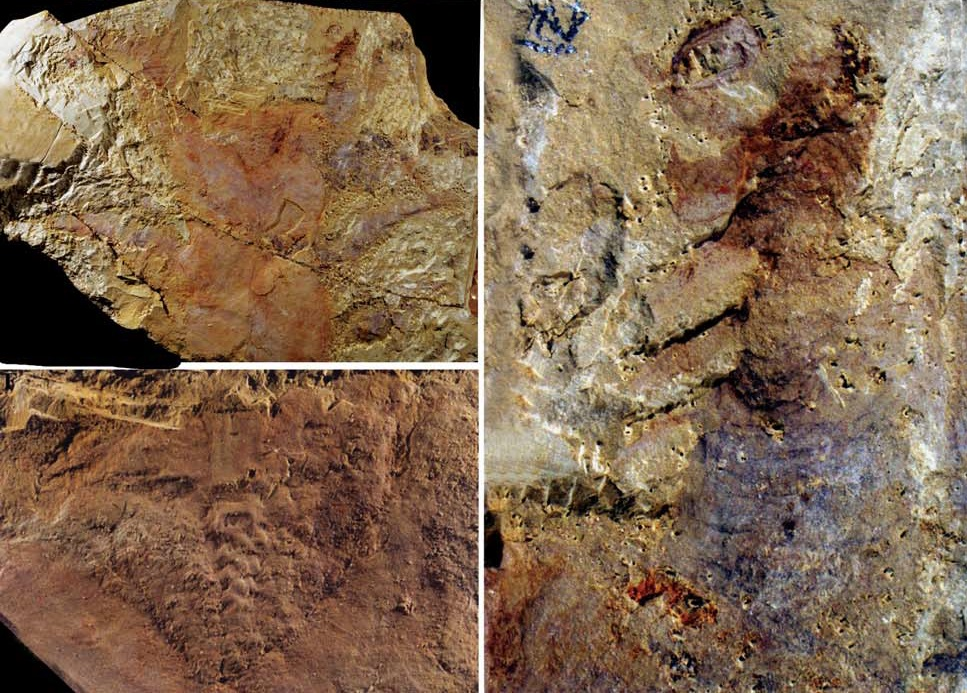
Fossils

Jianshanopodia resembled the closely related siberiid Megadictyon. The head possessed a pair of grasping frontal appendages which bore wedge-shaped plates. The pharynx was surrounded by rows of denticles, resembling those of radiodonts and priapulids. The trunk was annulated, with a pair of stout legs (lobopods) on each body segment. Due to the lack of a complete specimen, the exact number of body segments and leg pairs is uncertain. If it had 12 body segments, the living animal might have grown over 20 cm. Each leg was lined with rows of tubercles and tree-like branches, instead of being tipped with claws as in many other lobopodians. The trunk terminated with a large median lobe and a pair of small lateral lobes, forming a fan-like structure. Inside the trunk was a sediment-filled gut surrounded by serially repeated diverticulae.

It has been suggested that Jianshanopodia mainly crawled on the sea floor, but could swim with its fan-like tail when necessary. The leg branches might have functioned as external gills. It is thought to be predatory and have sucked up prey with its short 'trunk', consuming food items with its robust mouthparts and gut diverticulae.

== Phylogeny ==
Phylogenetic position of Jianshanopodia according to Knecht et al. 2025:

- †Diania
- - †Lenisambulatrix
  - - - †Paucipodia
      - - †Thanahita
        - - †Eoconchariidae
            - †Microdictyon
            - †Fusuchoncharium
            - †Quadratapora
          - - - †Xenusion
              - †Onychodictyon
            - - †Strictocorniculum
              - †Rhombocorniculum
              - †Orstenotubulus
              - †Carbotubulus
              - †Hallucigenia fortis
              - †Hallucigenia sparsa
              - - †Hallucigenia hongmeia
                - - †Cardiodictyon
                  - - Tardigrada
                    - †Luolishaniida
                      - - †Ovatiovermis
                        - †Facivermis
                      - - †Luolishania
                        - †Collinsovermidae
                          - †Acincocricus
                          - - †Collinsovermis
                            - - †Collinsium
                              - †Entothyreos
    - - †Aysheaiidae
        - †Aysheaia
        - - †Hadranax
          - †Palaeocampa
      - Antennopoda
        - - †Antennacanthopodia
          - Onychophora (velvet worms)
        - - †Siberiidae
            - †Siberion
            - †Megadictyon
            - †Jianshanopodia
          - - - †Pambdelurion
              - †Kerygmachelidae
            - - †Opabiniidae
              - - †Radiodonta (e.g. Anomalocaris)
                - Deuteropoda (modern arthropods)

Cladogram after McCall 2023:

- Total group Euarthropoda
  - †Siberiidae
    - †Siberion
    - †Megadictyon
    - †Jianshanopodia
  - - †Kerygmachelidae
      - †Utahnax
      - - †Kerygmachela
        - † Mobulavermis
    - - - †Omnidens
        - †Pambdelurion
      - - †Opabiniidae
        - - †Caryosyntrips
          - - †Radiodonta (e.g. Anomalocaris)
            - - Deuteropoda (modern arthropods)
