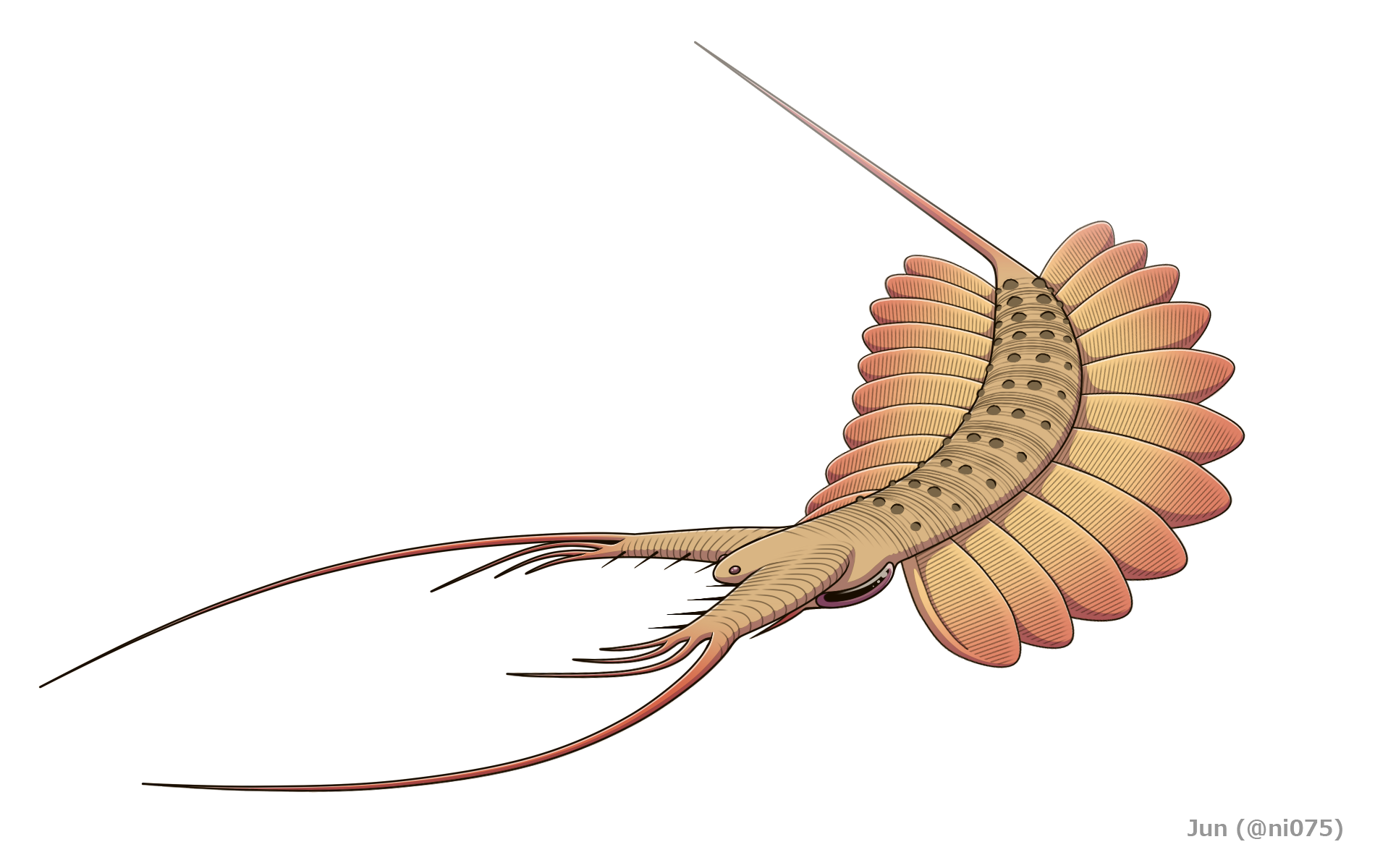
- Restoration of Kerygmachela kierkegaardi
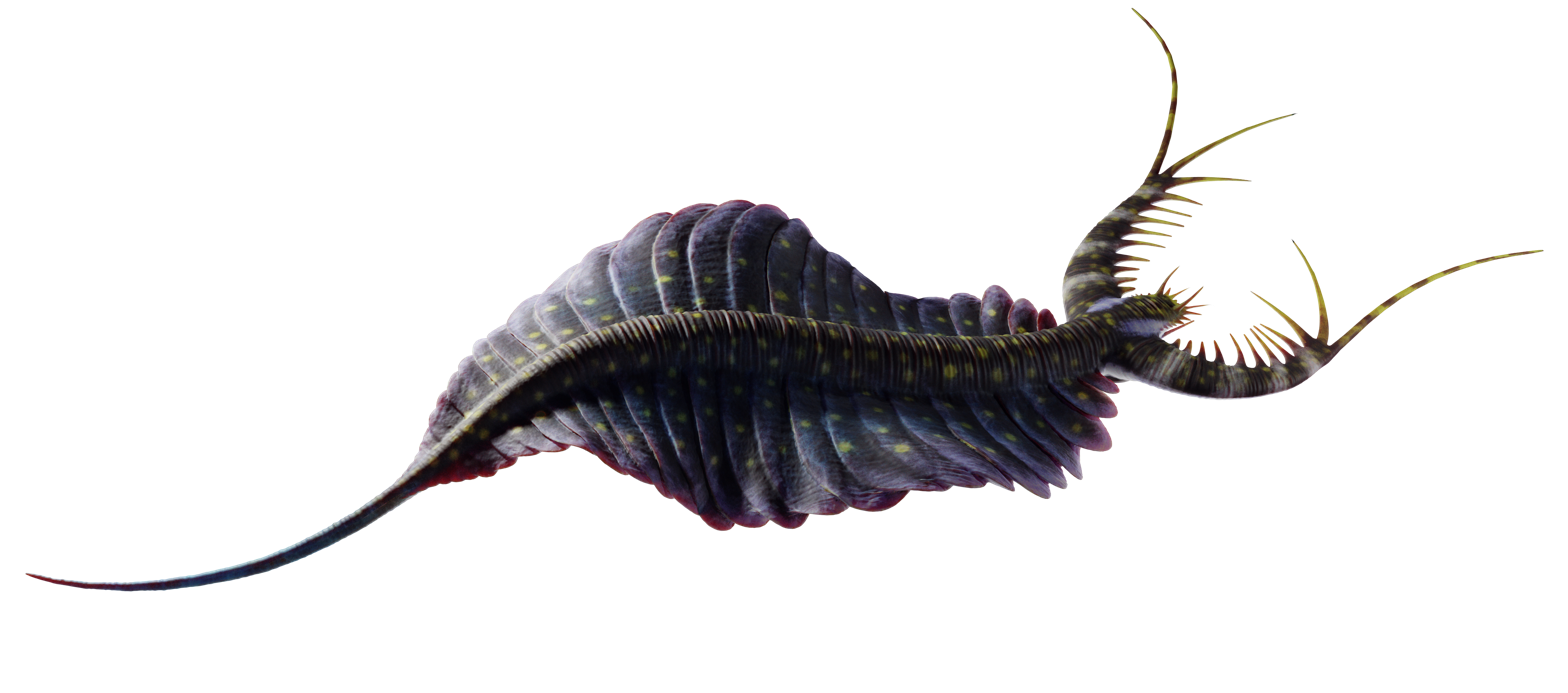
- Restoration of Mobulavermis adustus

Scientific classification
- Kingdom: Animalia
- Stem group: Arthropoda
- Class: †Dinocaridida
- Family: †Kerygmachelidae; McCall, 2023

Genera
- †Kerygmachela; †Utahnax; †Mobulavermis

= Kerygmachelidae =

Kerygmachelidae Temporal range: Lower to Middle Cambrian, 520–505 Ma

Family of Gilled lobopodians from the Cambrian

Kerygmachelidae is a family of gilled lobopodians (stem-arthropods with flapping trunk appendages and radial mouths) from the Cambrian period. Currently three genera are included in the family: Kerygmachela from the lower Cambrian of Greenland, Utahnax from the middle Cambrian of Utah, and Mobulavermis from the lower-middle Cambrian of Nevada. These animals are characterized by well developed frontal appendages similar to other dinocaridids like the radiodonts, except the ones present in these genera are horizontal to one another, and do not curve downward. These animals were most likely nektonic predators, using their large trunk flaps to swim in the water column, and using their frontal appendages to grab small-sized prey. Unlike other groups referred to as lobopodians, this family lacks the distinctive legs (lobopods) that are usually seen in lobopodian groups.

Cladogram after McCall 2023:

- Total group Euarthropoda
  - †Siberiidae
    - †Siberion
    - †Megadictyon
    - †Jianshanopodia
  - - †Kerygmachelidae
      - †Utahnax
      - - †Kerygmachela
        - † Mobulavermis
    - - - †Omnidens
        - †Pambdelurion
      - - †Opabiniidae
        - - †Caryosyntrips
          - - †Radiodonta (e.g. Anomalocaris)
            - - Deuteropoda (modern arthropods)
