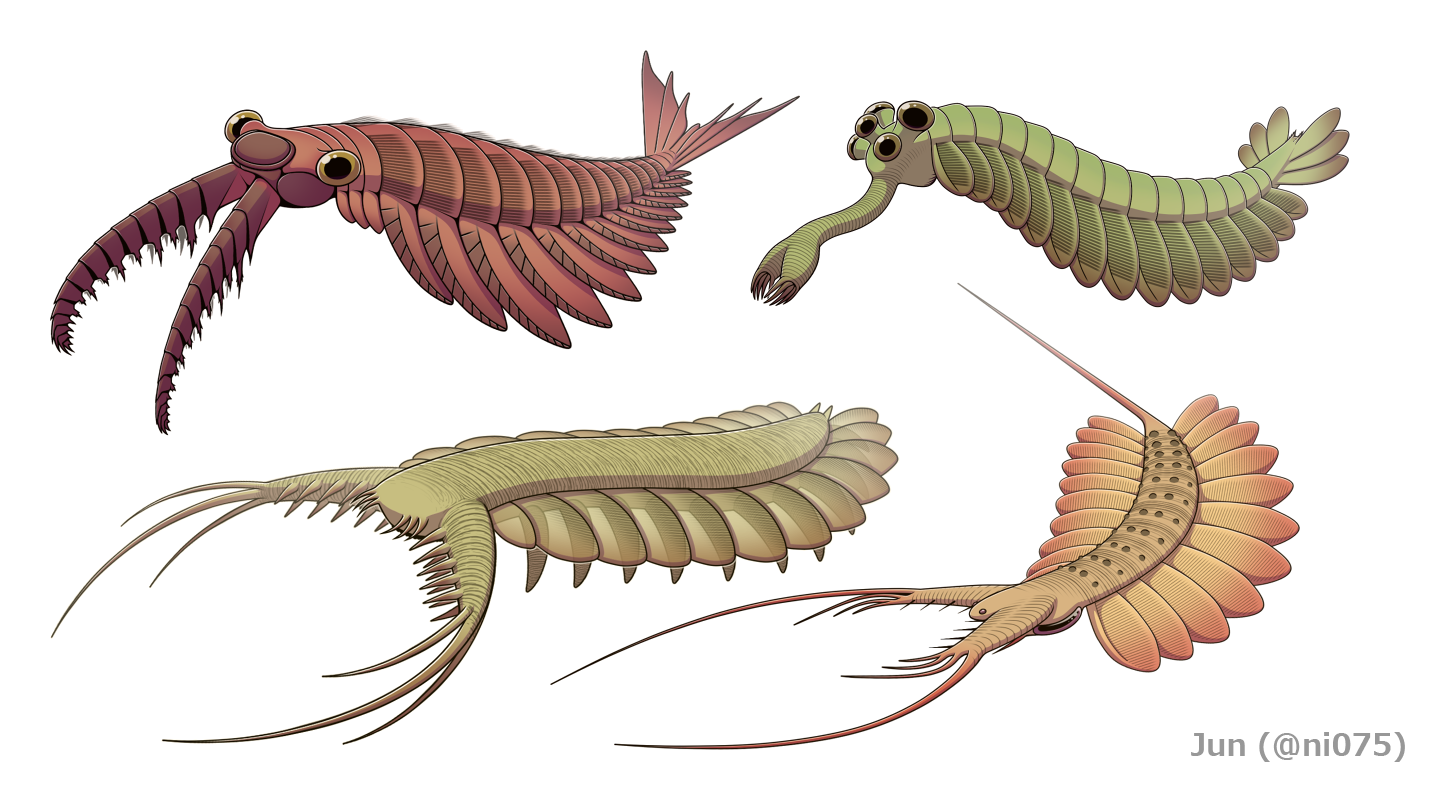
- Assembly of dinocaridids (Anomalocaris, Opabinia, Pambdelurion and Kerygmachela)

Scientific classification
- Kingdom: Animalia
- Superphylum: Ecdysozoa
- Clade: Panarthropoda
- Stem group: Arthropoda
- Class: †Dinocaridida; Collins, 1996

Groups included
- Caryosyntrips?; Cucumericrus?; Pambdelurion; Omnidens; Youti; Kerygmachelidae; Opabiniidae; Radiodonta

Cladistically included but traditionally excluded taxa
- Deuteropoda

= Dinocaridida =

Dinocaridida Temporal range: Cambrian–Early Devonian

Extinct class of basal arthropods

Dinocaridida (Note: Greek for deinos "terrible" and Latin for caris "crab" – sometimes informally rendered Dinocarida, but the second 'id' is linguistically correct – see Hou, Xianguang; Bergström, Jan; Jie, Yang (2006). "Distinguishing anomalocaridids from arthropods and priapulids". Geological Journal. 41 (3–4): 259–269. Bibcode:2006GeolJ..41..259X. doi:10.1002/gj.1050. S2CID 83582128.) is a proposed fossil taxon of basal arthropods, which flourished during the Cambrian period and survived up to Early Devonian. Characterized by a pair of frontal appendages and series of body flaps, the name of Dinocaridids (Greek for deinos "terrible" and Latin for caris "crab") refers to the suggested role of some of these members as the largest marine predators of their time. Dinocaridids are occasionally referred to as the 'AOPK group' by some literatures, as the group composed of Radiodonta (Anomalocaris and relatives), Opabiniidae (Opabinia and relatives), and the "gilled lobopodians" Pambdelurion and Kerygmachelidae. It is most likely paraphyletic, with Kerygmachelidae and Pambdelurion more basal than the clade composed of Opabiniidae, Radiodonta and other arthropods.

== Anatomy ==
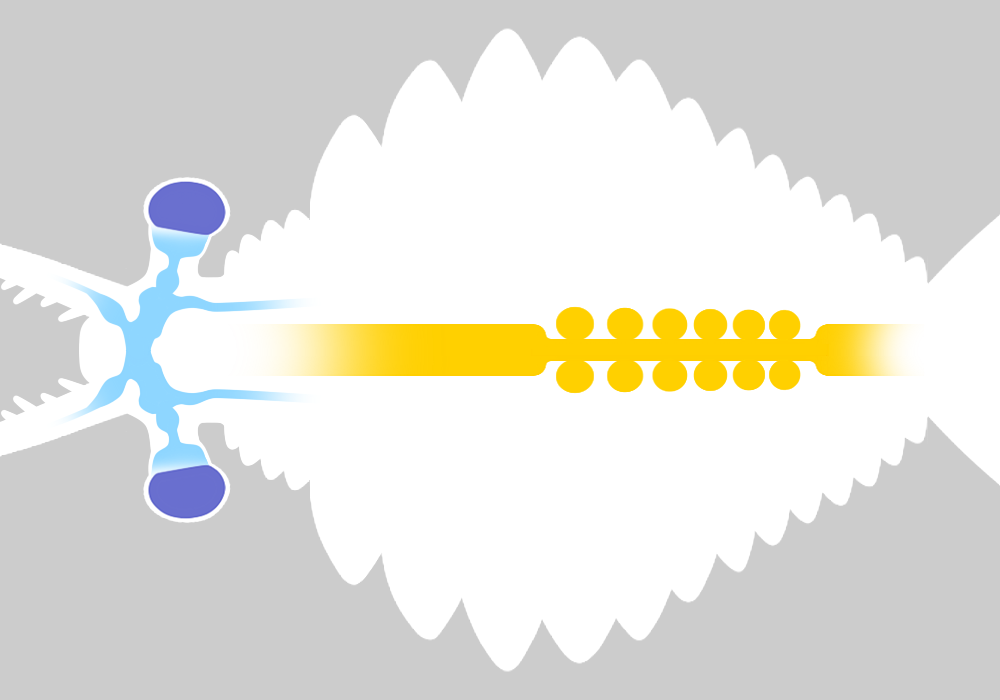
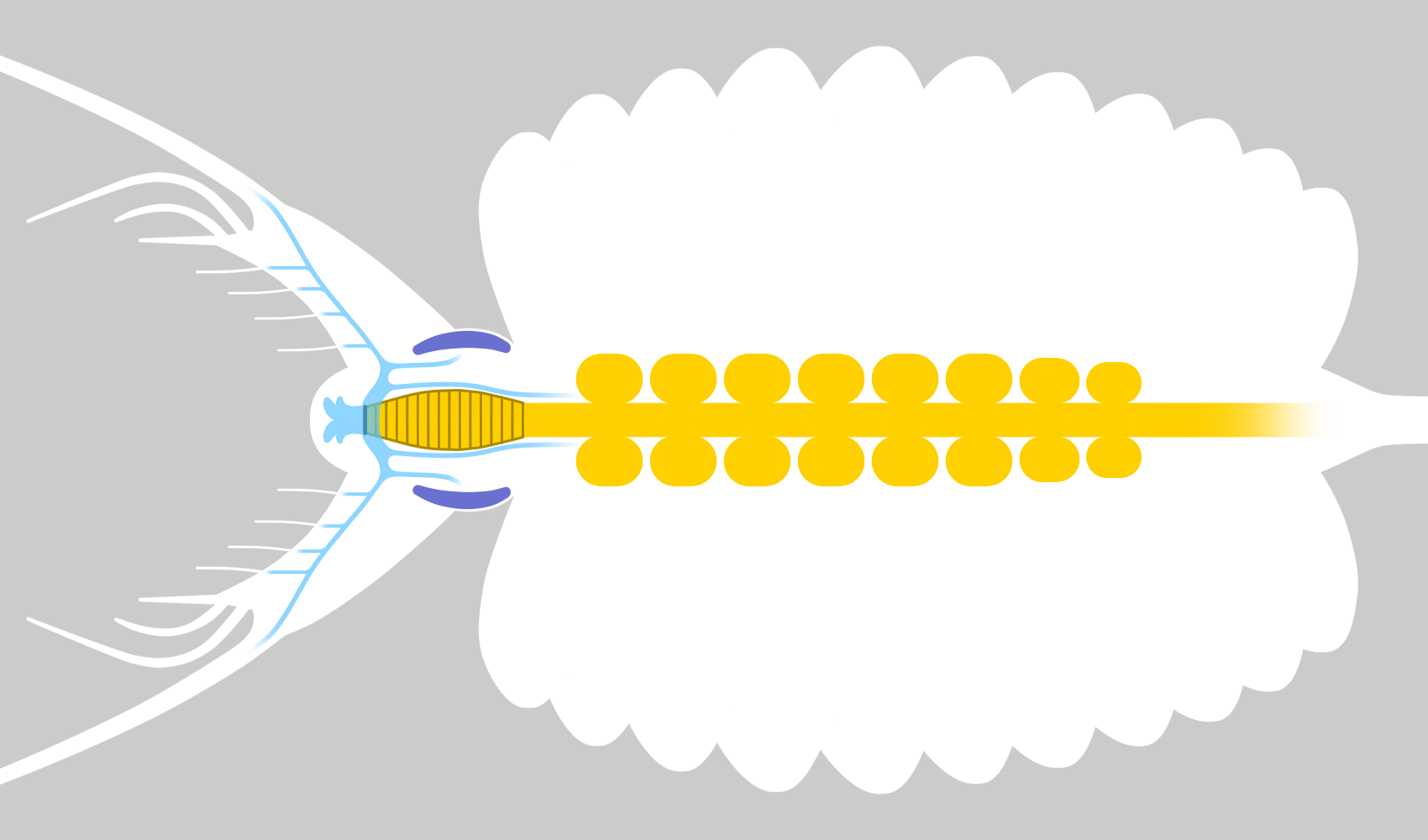
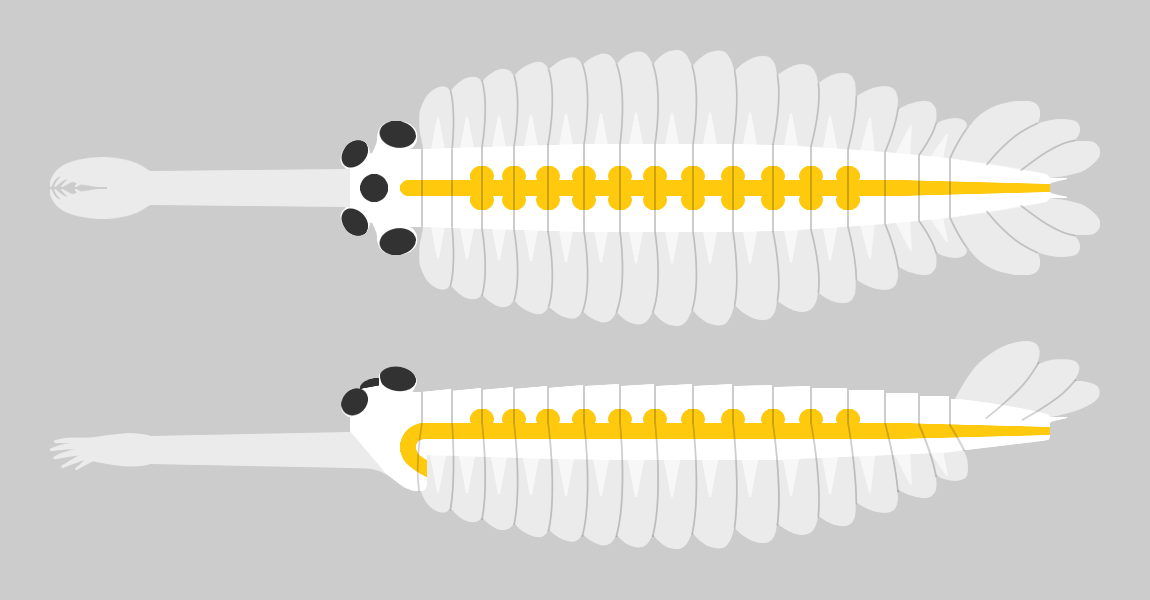
Eyes (deep blue and black), brain (light blue) and digestive system (yellow) of Radiodonta (left), Kerygmachela (center) and Opabinia (right)

Dinocaridids were bilaterally symmetrical, with a mostly non-mineralized cuticle and a body divided into two major groupings of tagmata (body-sections): head and trunk. The head apparently unsegmented and had a pair of specialized frontal appendages just in front of the mouth and eyes. The frontal appendages are either lobopodous (soft as in gilled lobopodians) or arthropodized (hardened and segmented as in Radiodonta) and usually paired, but highly fused into a nozzle-like structure in Opabiniidae. Based on their preocular position and putative protocerebral origin, the frontal appendages are generally thought to be homologous to the labrum of euarthropods and primary antennae of onychophorans, while subsequent evidence also suggests a deutocerebral origin (homologous to the jaws of onychophora and great appendages/antennae/chelicerae of euarthropods). The trunk possessed multiple segments, each with its own gill branch and swimming flaps (lobes). It is thought that these flaps moved in an up-and-down motion, in order to propel the animal forward in a fashion similar to the cuttlefish. In gilled lobopodian genera, the trunk may have borne a lobopodous limb (lobopod) underneath each of the flaps. The midgut of dinocaridids had paired digestive glands similar to those of siberiid lobopodians and Cambrian euarthropods. The dinocaridid brain is relatively simple than those of a euarthropod (three-segmented), it is thought to be composed of either one (only protocerebrum) or two cerebral ganglions (protocerebrum and deutocerebrum).

== Classification ==
- Ecdysozoa
  - Cycloneuralia
    Priapulida, Nematoda etc.
  - Panarthropoda
    - Onychophora
    - Tardigrada
    - †
      Lobopodian grade (paraphyletic)
    - Total group Arthropoda
      - †
        Siberiidae
      - - †
          Pambdelurion
        - †
          Kerygmachela
        - - †
            Opabiniidae
          - †
            Radiodonta
          - Deuteropoda

Although some authors may rather suggest different taxonomic affinities (e.g. as cycloneuralian relatives), most of the phylogenetic studies suggest that dinocaridids are stem group arthropods. Under this scenario, Dinocaridida is a paraphyletic grade in correspond to the arthropod crown group (Euarthropoda or Deuteropoda) and also suggest a lobopodian origin of the arthropod lineage. In general, the gilled lobopodian genera Pambdelurion and Kerygmachela which have lobopodian traits (e.g. lobopodous appendage, annulation) occupied the basal position; while Opabiniidae and Radiodonta are more derived and closely related to the arthropod crown group, with the latter even having significant arthropod affinities such as arthropodization and head sclerites.

In the original description, Dinocaridida was composed of only Opabiniidae and Radiodonta. With the exclusion of questionable taxa (e.g. the putative opabiniid Myoscolex), the former were known only by Opabinia, while all radiodont species were grouped under a single family: Anomalocarididae (hence the previous common name 'Anomalocaridids'). In later studies, the gilled lobopodians Pambdelurion and Kerygmachela were also regarded to be dinocaridids, two new opabiniid genera, Utaurora and Mieridduryn were described, other strange dinocaridids like Parvibellus (which might actually be a juvenile siberiid lobopodian), many radiodonts were reassigned to other new families (Amplectobeluidae, Tamisiocarididae and Hurdiidae), and a new family, Kerygmachelidae, was named.

== Distribution ==
The group was geographically widespread, and has been reported from Cambrian strata in Canada, United States, Greenland, China, Australia and Russia, as well as the Early to Middle Ordovician of Morocco and Wales and the Early Devonian of Germany.
