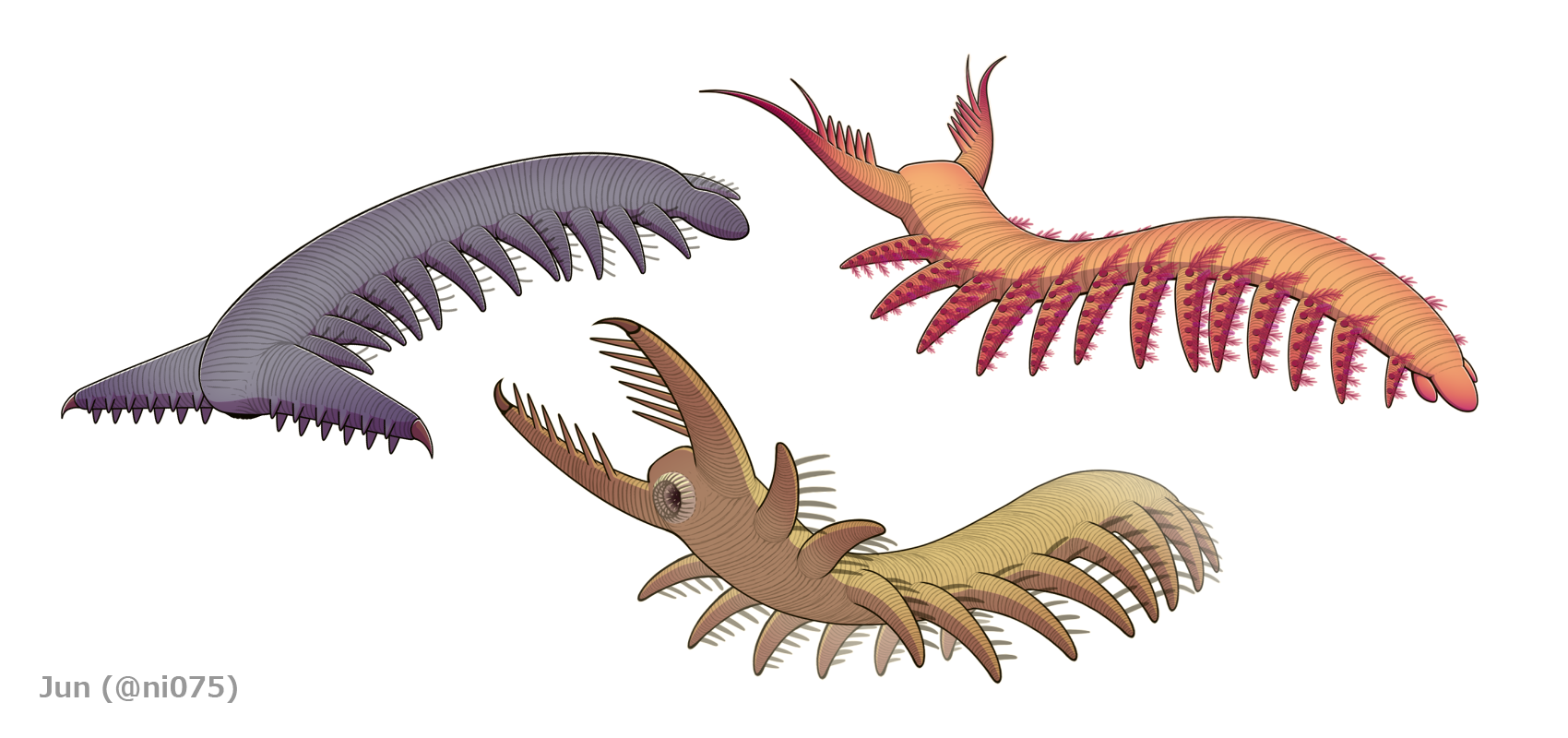
- Reconstructions of the known siberiids

Scientific classification
- Kingdom: Animalia
- Clade: Panarthropoda
- Phylum: †Lobopodia
- Class: †Xenusia
- Order: †Siberiida; Dzik, 2011
- Family: †Siberiidae; Dzik, 2011

Genera
- †Siberion; †Jianshanopodia; †Megadictyon; †Parvibellus? (may represent the larva of any described siberiids)

= Siberiidae =

Siberiidae Temporal range: Cambrian Stage 3–Cambrian Series 2

Extinct family of Cambrian lobopodians

Siberiidae is a family of Cambrian lobopodians, sometimes called "jianshanopodians" or "giant lobopodians". They are suggested to be more closely related to "gilled lobopodians" and arthropods than to other lobopodians, providing important evidence for the origin of the arthropod body plan.

== Morphology ==
Siberiids often reach large sizes, achieving as much as 22 cm, or even over 30 cm in length as seen in Jianshanopodia.

=== Cephalon ===
The anterior of the cephalon is blunt, prominent appendages equipped with endites protrude laterally from it. In the case of Megadictyon the appendages terminate with sclerotized spines. The bottom of the head exposes an oral opening surrounded by an array of layers of plates and teeth which has been compared to the oral cones of radiodonts; the pharynx houses numerous pharyngeal teeth, and has been compared to that of priapulids. No eyes have been observed.

=== Limbs ===
Siberiids bear stout, unarthropodized, annulated limbs called lobopods. They bear gill-like papillae protruding dorsally from the series of annuli; These papillae were weakly sclerotized in Siberion and form branched feather-like structures in Jianshanopodia in order to greatly increase the surface area for respiration; the lobopods house internal fine canals which branch off into the papillae. Their trunk limbs also lack claws.

=== Trunk ===
Numerous uniform annulations ornament the broad trunk of siberiids, however Jianshanopodia exhibits primitive segmentation in its trunk region comprising at least 9 segments. The dorsal surface on Siberion is adorned by two rows of small lateral tubercles corresponding to the annuli.

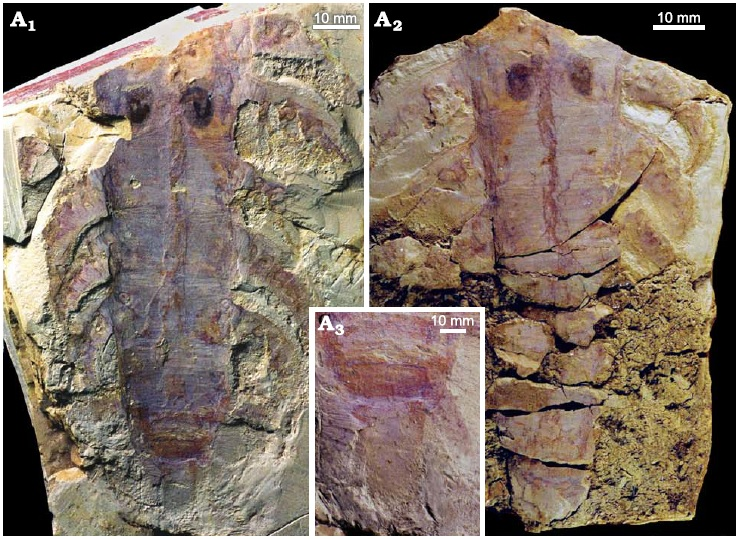
A fossil of Jianshanopodia presenting the gut diverticulae and the caudal area.

=== Caudal area ===
Siberiids exhibit a differentiated terminal caudal (tail) protrusion. In Jianshanopodia the caudal end forms a trilobed tail fan comprising the terminal protrusion and a pair of lobes positioned laterally to the median lobe, and pointing posteriorly; in front of the tail fan is a pair of smaller, distinct laterally oriented lobopods.

=== Internal anatomy ===
The digestive system is generally equipped with gut diverticulae allowing for more efficient digestion and metabolism; however Siberion may be an exception to that. Based on Jianshanopodia, the respiratory papillae also house fine canals.

=== Other members of Siberiidae ===
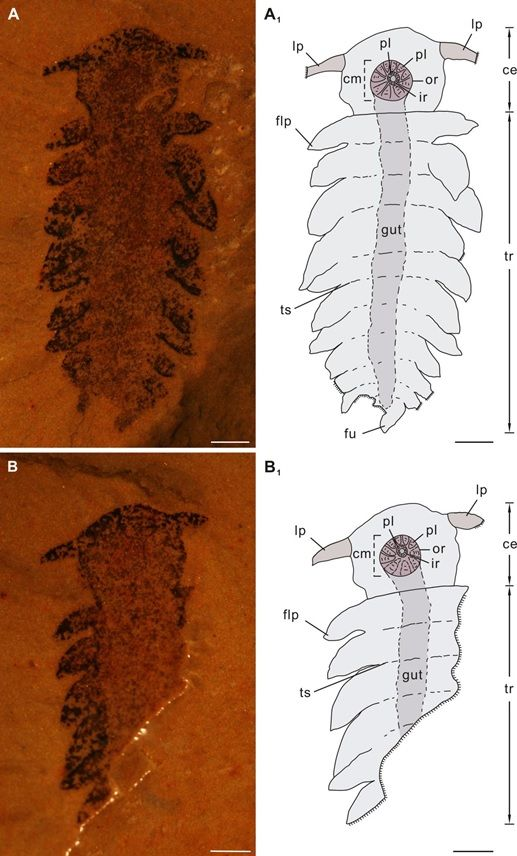
The holotype and only specimen of Parvibellus.

Parvibellus was initially described as a lower stem group arthropod; however, a recent study has suggested Parvibellus to be an early developmental stage of a siberiid based on the features such as a ventral mouth opening surrounded by circlets of tooth plates, and the lack of eyes and claws. It lacks the respiratory papillae generally possessed by siberiids, but that can be explained by its small size which allows it to respirate without any specialized structures.

There are also several more indeterminate siberiids from the Chengjiang Lagerstätte which have not been described yet. One of them bears anterior papillae which are not seen in other siberiids, terminal spines on the frontal appendages, and gut diverticulae.

== Ecology ==
The respiratory papillae likely supported an active predatory lifestyle, similar to opabiniids, and radiodonts which too bear specialized respiratory structures, and raptorial appendages. This lifestyle is also supported by the gut diverticulae allowing for more efficient digestion and metabolism present in Jianshanopodia and Megadictyon. Siberiids have been found in the Chengjiang Biota and the Sinsk Biota.

== Phylogeny ==
In the past siberiids have been considered a transitional group between 'Xenusia' and Radiodonta, but newer studies have recovered the phylogenetic relationships to be more complex and siberiids as basal total-group arthropods near Aysheaia which too bears differentiated raptorial frontal appendages.

Phylogeny of Panarthropoda after Knecht et al. 2025:

- †Diania
- - †Lenisambulatrix
  - - - †Paucipodia
      - - †Thanahita
        - - †Eoconchariidae
            - †Microdictyon
            - †Fusuchoncharium
            - †Quadratapora
          - - - †Xenusion
              - †Onychodictyon
            - - †Strictocorniculum
              - †Rhombocorniculum
              - †Orstenotubulus
              - †Carbotubulus
              - †Hallucigenia fortis
              - †Hallucigenia sparsa
              - - †Hallucigenia hongmeia
                - - †Cardiodictyon
                  - - Tardigrada
                    - †Luolishaniida
                      - - †Ovatiovermis
                        - †Facivermis
                      - - †Luolishania
                        - †Collinsovermidae
                          - †Acincocricus
                          - - †Collinsovermis
                            - - †Collinsium
                              - †Entothyreos
    - - †Aysheaiidae
        - †Aysheaia
        - - †Hadranax
          - †Palaeocampa
      - Antennopoda
        - - †Antennacanthopodia
          - Onychophora (velvet worms)
        - - †Siberiidae
            - †Siberion
            - †Megadictyon
            - †Jianshanopodia
          - - - †Pambdelurion
              - †Kerygmachelidae
            - - †Opabiniidae
              - - †Radiodonta (e.g. Anomalocaris)
                - Deuteropoda (modern arthropods)

== See also ==
- Amplectobeluidae
- "Hallucishaniids"
- Aysheaia
- Xenusion
- Hadranax
