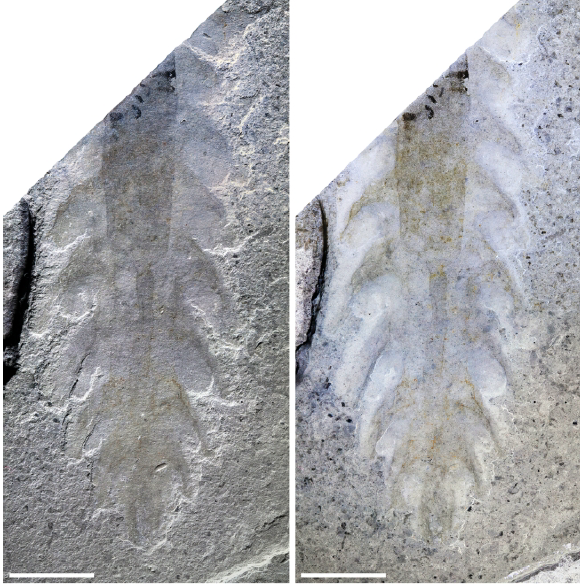
- Fossil of Utahnax
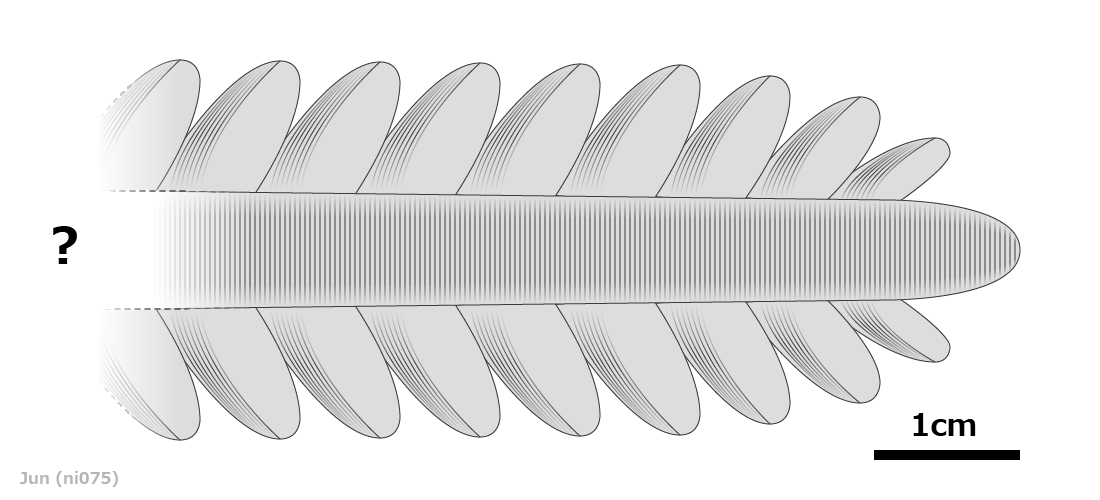
- A reconstruction of the known parts of Utahnax

Scientific classification
- Kingdom: Animalia
- Phylum: Arthropoda
- Class: †Dinocaridida
- Family: †Kerygmachelidae
- Genus: †Utahnax; Lerosey-Aubril and Ortega-Hernández, 2022
- Species: †U. vannieri

Binomial name
- †Utahnax vannieri Lerosey-Aubril and Ortega-Hernández, 2022

= Utahnax =

Utahnax Temporal range: Drumian

Extinct genus of gilled lobopodian

Utahnax is a genus of kerygmachelid lobopodian from the Drumian of Utah, containing one species, Utahnax vannieri, either from the Marjum or Wheeler formation.

== Description ==
Utahnax's preserved section is roughly 6 cm (2.4 in) long, with at least eight pairs of ventral flaps similar to those found on Kerygmachela. Unusually, it does not appear to have had legs, suggesting the ventral flaps are broadened lobopods similar to the ventral flaps on radiodonts, and casting doubt on whether Kerygmachela had legs or whether reported "lobopods" are actually muscles of the flaps. In addition, it may have borne complex digestive glands similar to those of radiodonts.

== Ecology ==
As Utahnax nests firmly within the predatory clade of "gilled lobopodians", it can be assumed that it was also predatory. Its lack of lobopods also suggests it was primarily if not wholly pelagic, occupying a similar niche to radiodonts. This may explain the paucity of gilled lobopodians in the fossil record, as they may have competed with radiodonts in the pelagic predatory niches.

== Etymology ==
The genus name Utahnax is derived from Utah, where it was found, and the Greek word anax, meaning "king" or "ruler". The species name vannieri honours Jean Vannier for their extensive work on fossil ecdysozoans.

== Distribution ==
Utahnax is known from only a singular part and counterpart. As the fossil was not precisely labelled, it is unknown where exactly it was found in Utah, although an origin in the Weeks Formation or most of the Wheeler Shale can be ruled out due to differing fossil preservation methods.
