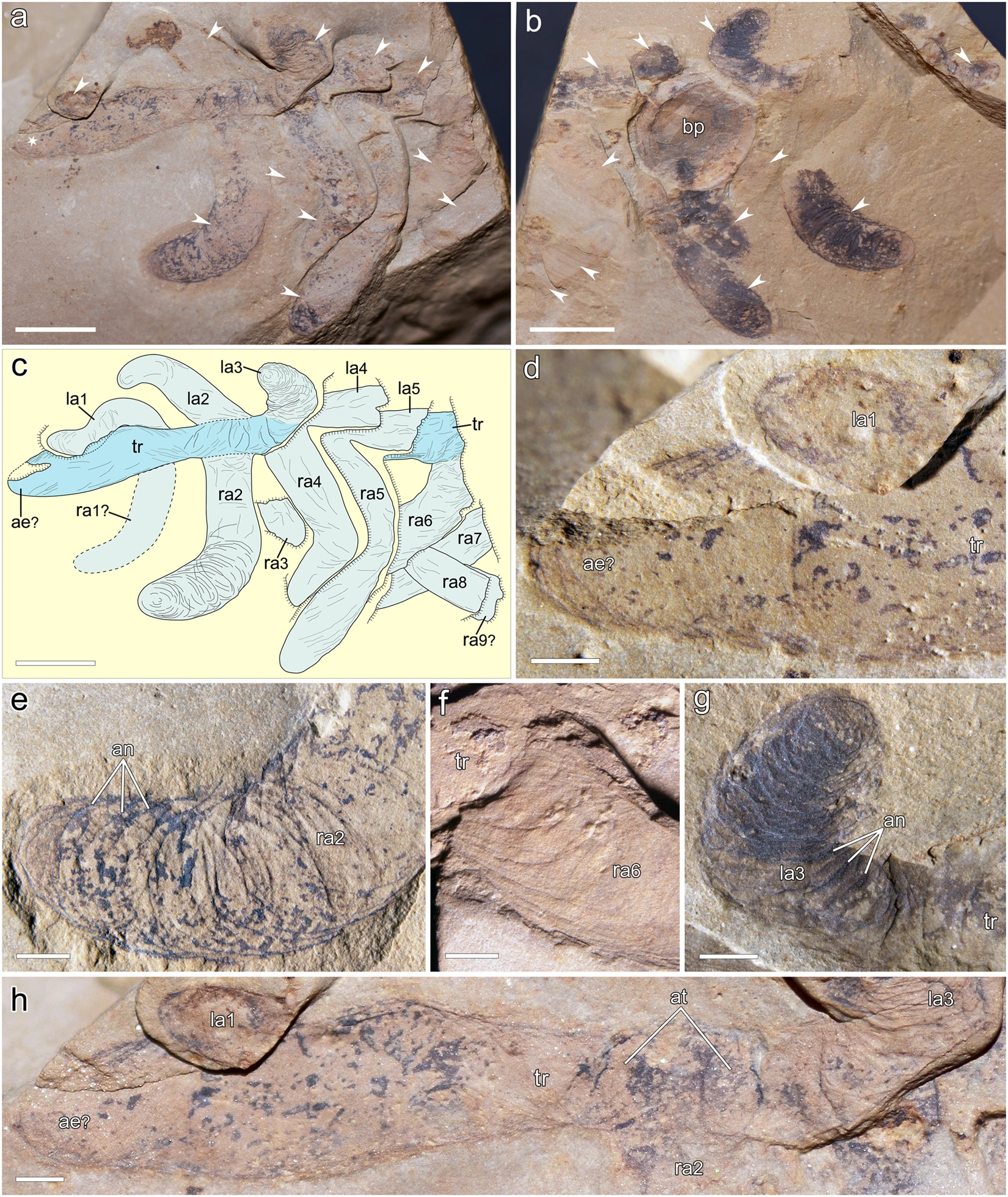
- Fossils of Lenisambulatrix
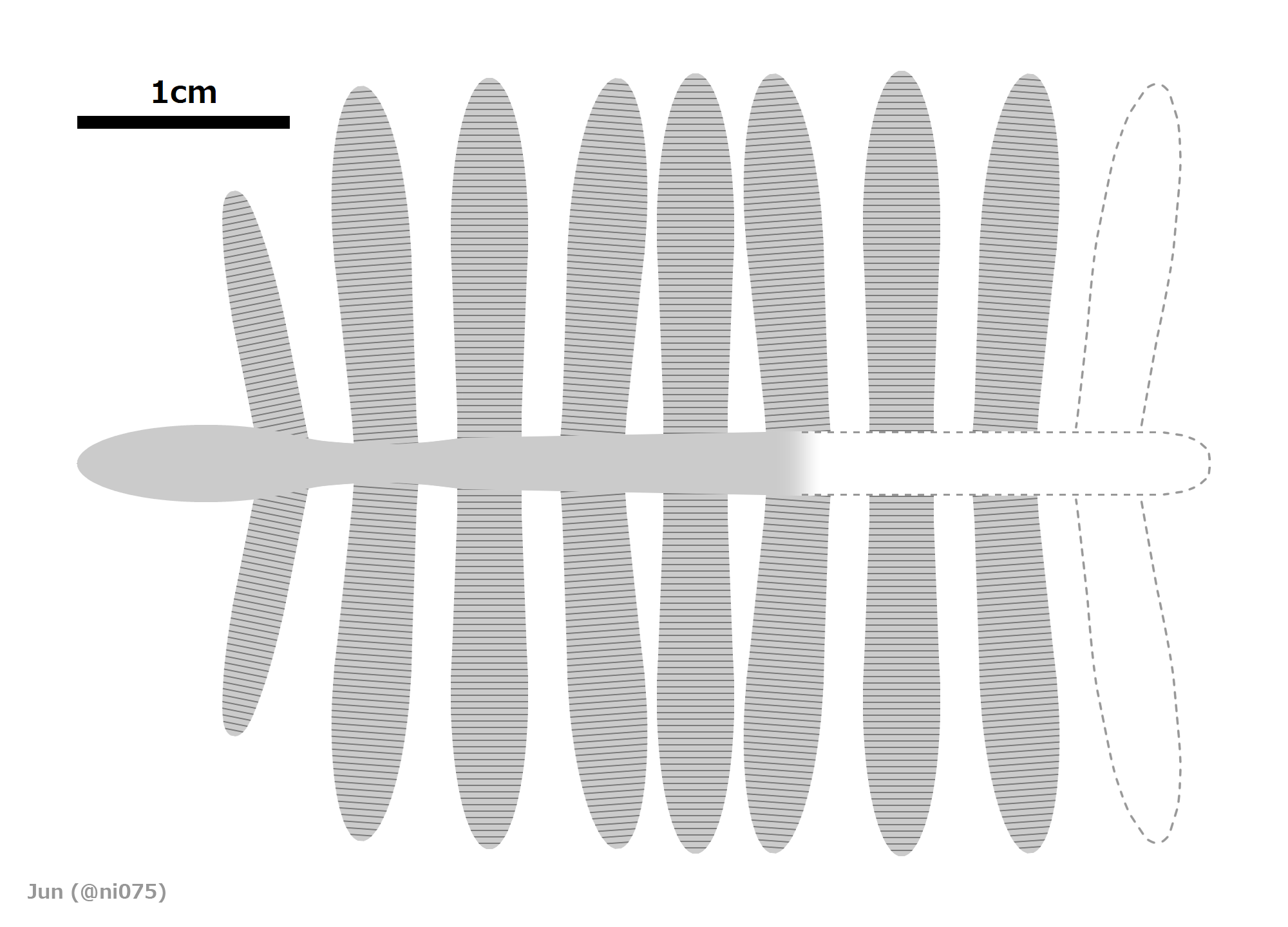
- Diagrammatic reconstruction of Lenisambulatrix

Scientific classification
- Kingdom: Animalia
- Clade: Panarthropoda
- Phylum: †Lobopodia
- Genus: †Lenisambulatrix
- Species: †L. humboldti

Binomial name
- †Lenisambulatrix humboldti Ou & Mayer, 2018

= Lenisambulatrix =

Lenisambulatrix Temporal range: Cambrian Stage 3

Extinct genus of Lobopodian

Lenisambulatrix (also known as "Humboldt lobopodian") is a genus of extinct worm belonging to the group Lobopodia and known from the Lower Cambrian Maotianshan shale of China. It is represented by a single species L. humboldti. The incomplete fossil was discovered and described by Qiang Ou and Georg Mayer in 2018. Due to its missing parts, its relationship with other lobopodians is not clear. It shares many structural features with another Cambrian lobopodian Diania cactiformis, a fossil of which was found alongside it.

== Discovery and naming ==
The fossil of Lenisambulatrix humboldti was discovered by Qiang Ou (China University of Geosciences, Beijing, China) and Georg Mayer (University of Kassel, Kassel, Germany). It was found in the Heilinpu Formation of the Huaguoshan section at Sanjiezi village, Erjie town, Yunnan, South China. The location is dated to Cambrian Series 2, Stage 3 (about 520 million years old). The excavation also yielded a fossil of Diania cactiformis, already described by Ou's team in 2011. The specimen was compressed partly with the fossil of a brachiopod Diandongia pista, which was described from the similar Maotianshan shale in 2003. The discovery was reported in the September issue of the Scientific Reports.

The generic name is derived from Latin words, lenis, meaning soft or smooth, or gentle, attributing to the smooth unarmoured body; ambulatrix, meaning walker. The specific name is in honour of the German zoologist Friedrich Wilhelm Heinrich Alexander von Humboldt, after whose name was established the Alexander von Humboldt Foundation, which funded the research.

== Description ==
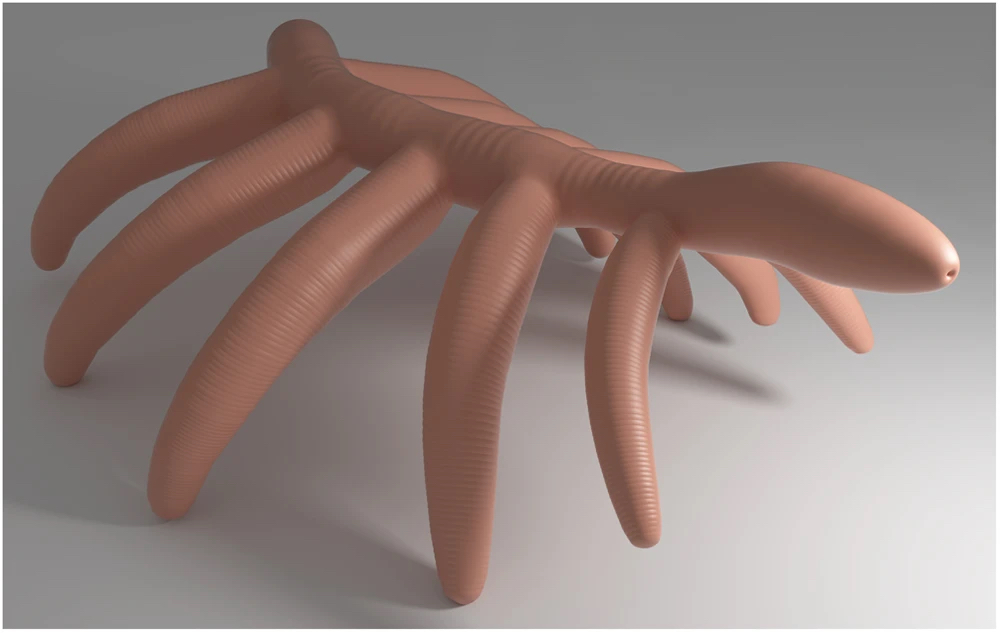
Three-dimensional reconstruction of Lenisambulatrix

Lenisambulatrix is seen as dark, carbonaceous and aluminosilicate films in a worn out mudstone. The original soft tissues and cuticle are represented by deposits of dark red to brown iron(III) oxide fine grains as a result of weathering of microscopic diagenetic pyrite. This fossilisation process is similar to those of other specimens in the Chengjian region. The fossil is oblique-ventrally compressed and the remaining parts are nicely preserved showing details of the body structure. This good preservation is characteristic of Chengjian biota and indicates death due to a catastrophic event.

The worm is a soft-bodied lobopodian without any hard part (sclerotized) surface, thus, appears naked in contrast to most lobopodians which bears spines as body armours. It is not preserved in a completely stretched form and many parts are missing. The measurable length of the body is 2.9 cm; with a width varying from 2 to 3.6 mm. The trunk consists of at least eight segments (somites), each of which bears a pair of thick and long legs. The fossil contains only the anterior part and the posterior region remains unknown. The head part is slightly extended and does not show any specific part. It is believed to be closely related to Diania, but with unique differences. The main distinction is numerous sclerotized spines that adorn Diania are completely absent in Lenisambulatrix. Diania's head is also much more rounded and shorter. The general outline of Lenisambulatrix's head more similar to other lobopodians such as Microdictyon sinicum, Paucipodia inermis, and Hallucigenia sparsa. However, the relatively thick and elongated legs measuring 11.6 to 18 mm long are unique to both Diania and Lenisambulatrix. Their legs also lack claws that are the common features in other lobopods. The legs indicate that they were adapted to walking or crawling on the bottom of waters. The simple body structure suggests that Lenisambulatrix is one of the earliest panarthropod animals.

== Classification ==
The slightly simplified cladogram below is from a 2025 paper by Knecht et al. redescribing the lobopodian Palaeocampa anthrax.

- - †Diania
  - - †Lenisambulatrix
    - - - †Paucipodia
        - - †Thanahita
          - - †Eoconchariidae
              - †Microdictyon
              - †Fusuchoncharium
              - †Quadratapora
            - - - †Xenusion
                - †Onychodictyon
              - - †Strictocorniculum
                - †Rhombocorniculum
                - †Orstenotubulus
                - †Carbotubulus
                - †Hallucigenia fortis
                - †Hallucigenia sparsa
                - - †"Hallucigenia" hongmeia
                  - - †Cardiodictyon
                    - - Tardigrada (tardigrades)
                      - †Luolishaniida
                        - - †Ovatiovermis
                          - †Facivermis
                        - - †Luolishania
                          - †Collinsovermidae
                            - †EBS Collinsovermid (SAM P14848)
                            - - †Acinocricus
                              - - †Collinsovermis
                                - - †Collinsium
                                  - †Entothyreos
      - - †Aysheaiidae
          - †Aysheaia
          - - Soom Shale lobopodian (C1947)
            - - †Hadranax
              - †Palaeocampa
        - Antennopoda
          - - †Antennacanthopodia
            - Onychophora (velvet worms)
              - †Antennipatus
              - †Cretoperipatus
              - †Helenodora
              - Living onychophorans
          - - †Siberiidae
              - †Siberion
              - †Megadictyon
              - †Jianshanopodia
            - - - †Pambdelurion
                - †Kerygmachelidae
              - - †Opabiniidae
                - - †Radiodonta (e.g. Anomalocaris)
                  - Deuteropoda (modern arthropods)
