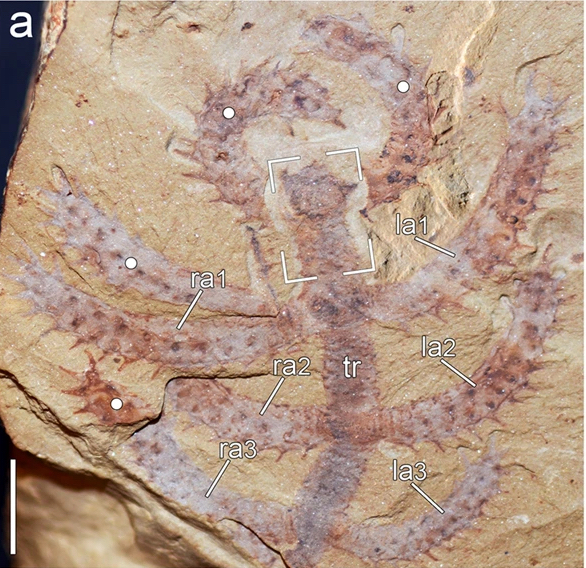
- Diania cactiformis fossil (ELEL-SJ102058) showing anterior trunk segments.

Scientific classification
- Kingdom: Animalia
- Clade: Panarthropoda
- Phylum: †Lobopodia
- Class: †Xenusia
- Genus: †Diania
- Species: †D. cactiformis

Binomial name
- †Diania cactiformis Liu et al., 2011

= Diania =

Diania Temporal range: Cambrian Stage 3

Extinct genus of Cambrian animals

Diania is an extinct genus of lobopodian panarthropod found in the Lower Cambrian Maotianshan shale of China, represented by a single species - D. cactiformis. Known during its investigation by the nickname "walking cactus", this organism belongs to a group known as the armoured lobopodians, and has a simple worm-like body with robust, spiny legs. Initially, the legs were thought to have a jointed exoskeleton and Diania was suggested to be evolutionarily close to early arthropods, but many later studies have rejected this interpretation.

== Discovery and naming ==
Fossils of Diania were discovered independently by Jianni Liu from the Northwest University (China) in Xi'an, Qiang Ou from the China University of Geosciences in Beijing and Michael Steiner of the Free University Berlin. The fossils come from the famous Chengjiang deposit – or Maotianshan shale – of south-west China and are about 520 million years old. Specifically, they come from the Yu'anshan Formation, dated to the Cambrian Stage 3.

The name Diania comes from "Dian" (Chinese: 滇), which is an abbreviation in the Chinese language for Yunnan; the province where the fossils were discovered. The specific epithet cactiformis is based on its spiny, cactus-like appearance, which led to it being informally called the "walking cactus" by the research team working on the fossils.

== Description ==
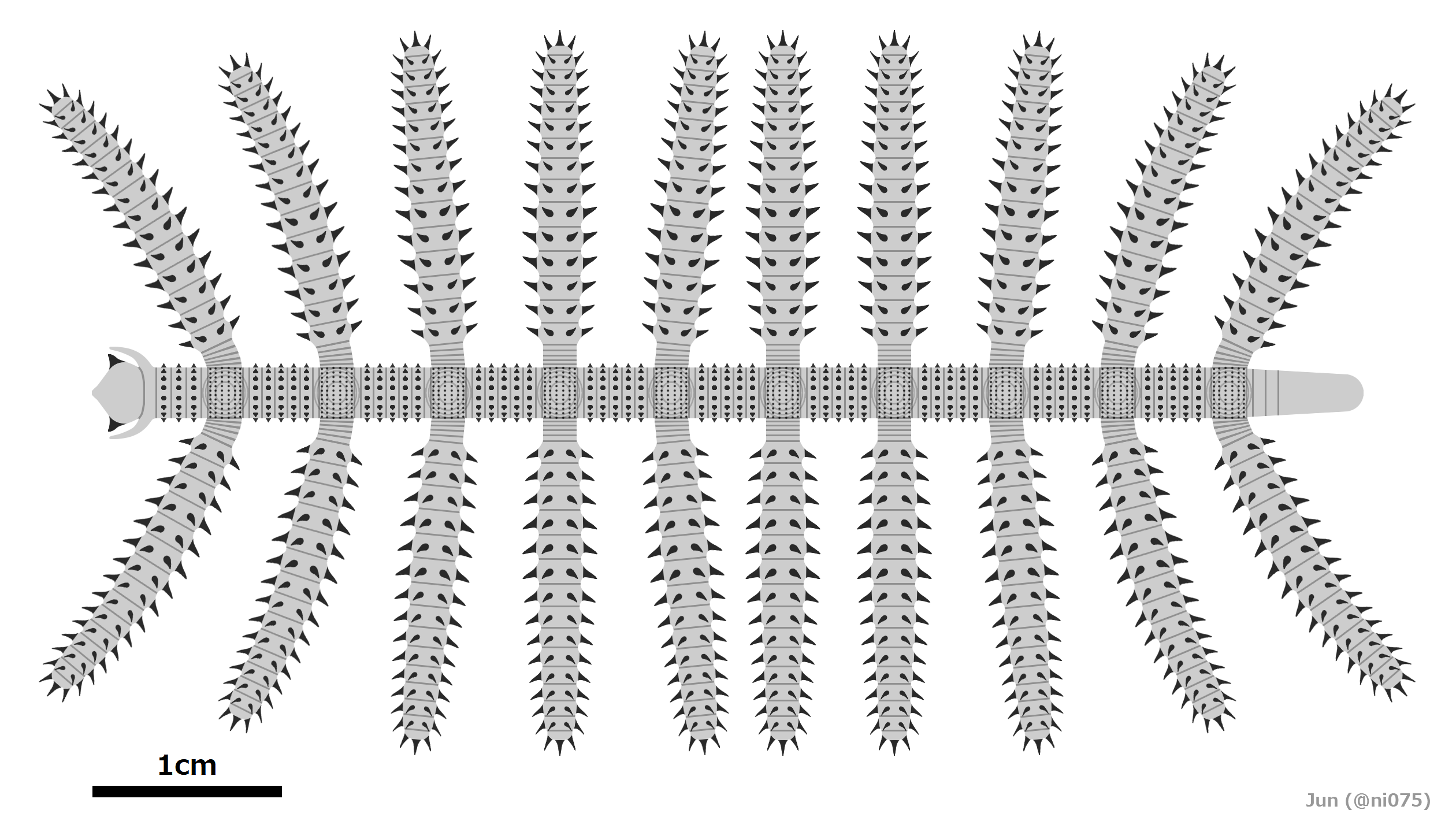
Diagrammatic reconstruction of Diania cactiformis based on specimen ELEL-SJ102058.

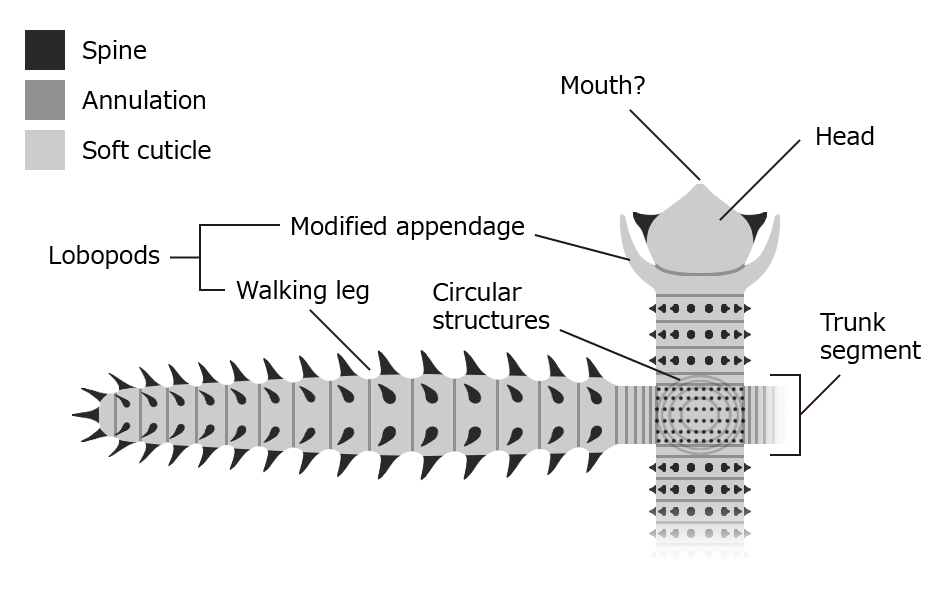
Diagrammatic reconstruction of the anterior region of Diania cactiformis, with head structure based on specimen ELEL-SJ102058.

The largest complete fossils of Diania are about 6 centimetres (2.4 in) in full length. Both the trunk and legs were covered by a soft cuticle with a series of annulations (ring-like grooves) and spines. The appendages (lobopods) are arranged in a much more lateral position than those of other lobopodians, giving the animal a similar dorsoventral aspect.

The worm-like body of Diania is composed of 10 trunk segments, each associated with a series of median circular structures and a pair of legs. Due to the subequal morphology between each trunk segment and the usually poor preservation of both trunk ends, it is difficult to define the anterior-posterior axis of the animal. The only sign of a head is in specimen ELEL-SJ102058, which shows a helmet-like structure, with a pair of lateral spines and median protrusion that is presumed to be the location of mouth opening. A pair of tiny, modified appendages are located immediately behind the head.

The most recognisable feature of Diania is the robust, spiny legs (walking lobopods) which led to it being nicknamed "walking cactus". While the leg base is narrow and simple, the remaining sections are subequally robust to the trunk, with 15 widely-spaced annulations and 4 rows of well-developed spines. Although the widen ring-like annulations superficially resembled the rigid, segmented exoskeleton of arthropod appendages (which had led to the previous misinterpretation as such), there are no signs of any hardened exoskeleton nor segmentation, with deformation from various fossil materials confirming their soft and unsegmented nature. Instead of terminal claws like most other lobopodians, the leg of Diania terminates with multiple (up to 3) spines similar to the preceding annulation.

== Paleoecology ==
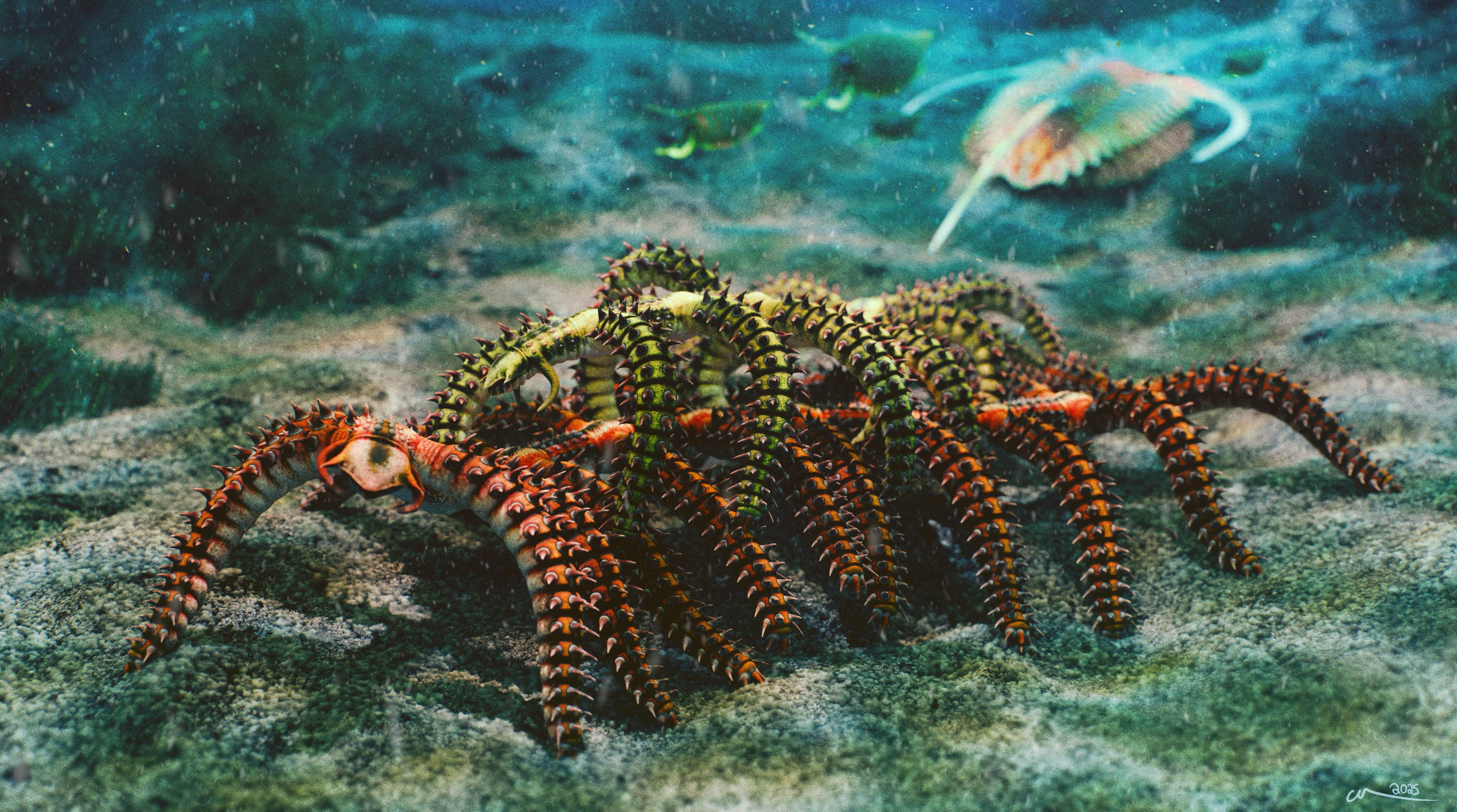
Reconstruction of two Diania cactiformis, with one climbing atop the other, based on the specimen ELEL-SJ102058 (above).

Diania may have been a benthic scavenger, using its robust legs to walk on the sea floor. The absence of sedimental gut content and terminal claws suggest Diania was unlikely to be a sediment feeder nor a good climber. The modified appendages behind its head may have played a sensing and/or food-manipulating role, similar to the tentacle-like appendages of Hallucigenia. Similar to the dorsal spines of other armoured lobopodians (e.g. Hallucigenia and Luolishania), the spines of Diania may have provided protection against predators.

== Classification ==
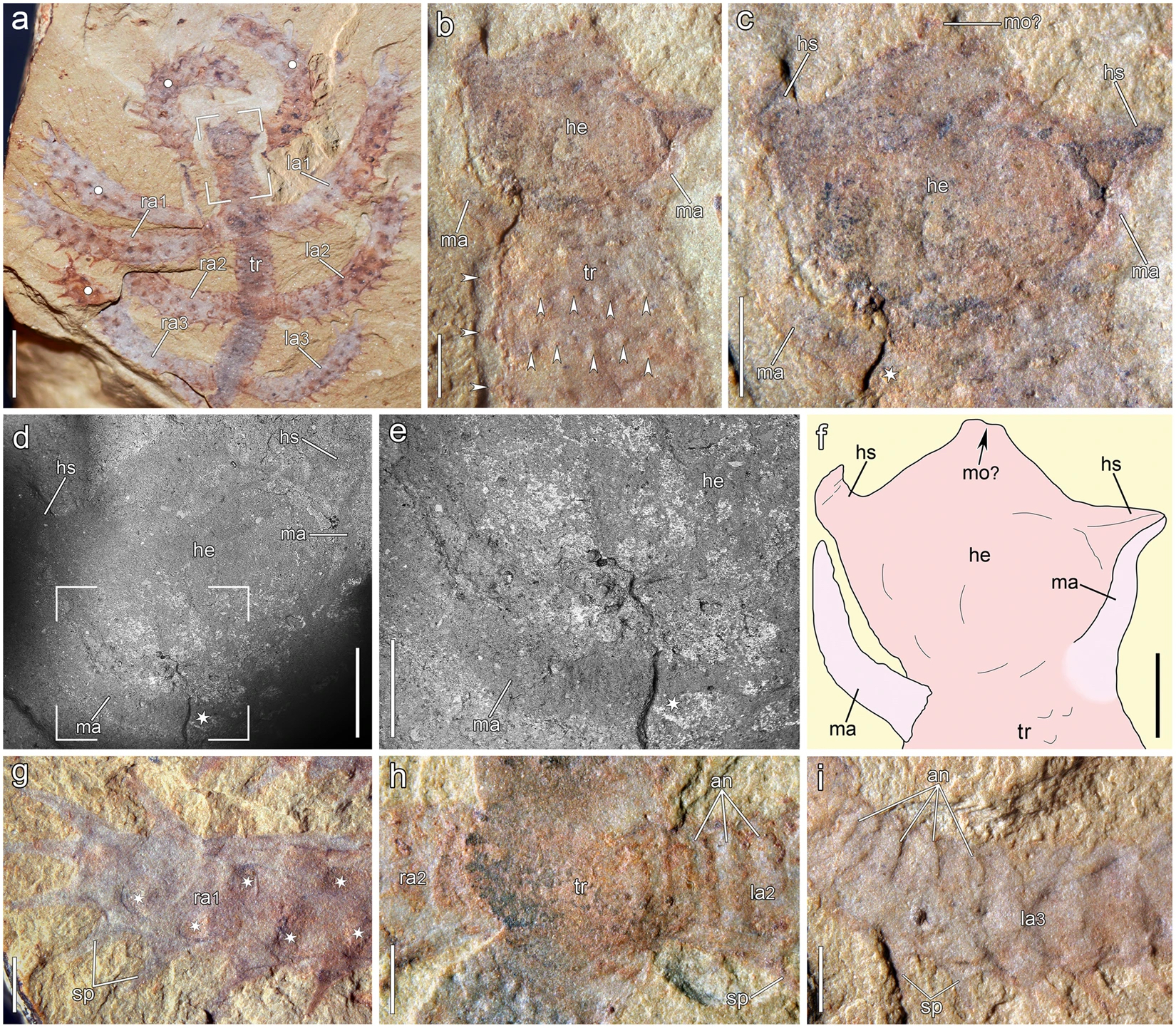
Diania cactiformis fossil

Diania belongs to a group of extinct animals known as the lobopodians. These have long been assumed to be related in some way to Arthropoda and it seems likely that arthropods evolved from somewhere within this group. However, all previously discovered lobopodians showed soft, annulated (ring-like grooves), but not segmented appendages called lobopods. In the original description (Liu et al. 2011), Diania was thought to be a lobopodian which appears to have evolved the name-giving character of the arthropods: scleritzed (hardened exoskeleton) and segmented appendages, which led to the suggestion of Diania being close to the origins of arthropods. Based on this interpretation, Liu et al. 2011 also suggests that Diania is evidence showing arthropodization (i.e. the appearance of exoskeleton and segmentation around the appendages) evolved before arthrodization (i.e. exoskeleton and segmentation around the body). The phylogenetic analysis provided by Liu et al. 2011 resolved Diania as the sister group of Schinderhannes and the remaining arthropods, although the possibility of Diania emerging before the evolution of stem-arthropods like Gilled lobopodians and radiodonts also had been discussed.

- Panarthropoda
  - - Tardigrada
    - Onychophora
    - Other lobopodians (paraphyletic) *
  - - Siberiids *
    - - Gilled lobopodians (paraphyletic) *
      - - Radiodonta
        - - Diania *
          - - Schinderhannes
            - Euarthropoda

Phylogenetic position of Diania following Liu et al. 2011. Lobopodian taxa indicaded by asterisk.

- Panarthropoda
  - Tardigrada
  - Onychophora
  - ?
    Diania *
  - Other lobopodians (paraphyletic) *
  - - Siberiids *
    - - Gilled lobopodians (paraphyletic) *
      - - Radiodonta（including Schinderhannes）
        - Euarthropoda

Neutralized phylogenetic position of Diania following the restudies after Ma et al. 2013. Lobopodian taxa indicaded by asterisk.

However, both the phylogenetic and morphological interpretations provided by Liu et al. 2011 were soon being questioned by multiple later studies. The data provided by Liu et al. 2011 are inconsistent with the suspected phylogenic relationships, as the analysis run by Mounce & Wills 2011 and Legg et al. 2011 could only resolve Diania as a lobopodian indirectly related to arthropods, even using the same method by Liu et al. 2011 and coding Diania as the bearer of arthropod-like appendages. Furthermore, the re-examination of Ma et al. 2013 and Ou & Mayer 2018 even clarified that the ring-like structures of Diania's leg were soft annulation shared by the lobopods of other lobopodians, lacking any characters comparable to those of an arthropod appendage (e.g. exoskeleton, segmentation, pivot joint and arthrodial membrane). This conclusion eventually rejected the evidence of arthropodization on Diania, as well as the link between Diania and the origin of arthropod appendages.

After a series of restudies, Diania remain as a unique lobopodian with uncleared, non-arthropod related phylogenetic position. Further phylogenetic analysis inconsistently placing Diania as a basal member of the onychophoran stem-group alongside Xenusion, or a basal lobopodian branched before the total-groups of each panarthropod phylum.

Other than the lacking of arthropodization, Restudy of Diania by Ma et al. 2013 also revealed the structure thought to be a stout head/proboscis by Liu et al. 2011 was in fact one of the animal's legs, the maximum number of leg annulations is 15 instead of 17, and the terminal leg structures are spines instead of claws. A putative head was first revealed by Ou & Mayer 2018 from the specimen ELEL-SJ102058.

The slightly simplified cladogram below is from a 2025 paper by Knecht et al. redescribing the lobopodian Palaeocampa anthrax. In it, Diania was found to be the most basal lobopodian

- - †Diania
  - - †Lenisambulatrix
    - - - †Paucipodia
        - - †Thanahita
          - - †Eoconchariidae
              - †Microdictyon
              - †Fusuchoncharium
              - †Quadratapora
            - - - †Xenusion
                - †Onychodictyon
              - - †Strictocorniculum
                - †Rhombocorniculum
                - †Orstenotubulus
                - †Carbotubulus
                - †Hallucigenia fortis
                - †Hallucigenia sparsa
                - - †"Hallucigenia" hongmeia
                  - - †Cardiodictyon
                    - - Tardigrada (tardigrades)
                      - †Luolishaniida
                        - - †Ovatiovermis
                          - †Facivermis
                        - - †Luolishania
                          - †Collinsovermidae
                            - †EBS Collinsovermid (SAM P14848)
                            - - †Acinocricus
                              - - †Collinsovermis
                                - - †Collinsium
                                  - †Entothyreos
      - - †Aysheaiidae
          - †Aysheaia
          - - Soom Shale lobopodian (C1947)
            - - †Hadranax
              - †Palaeocampa
        - Antennopoda
          - - †Antennacanthopodia
            - Onychophora (velvet worms)
              - †Antennipatus
              - †Cretoperipatus
              - †Helenodora
              - Living onychophorans
          - - †Siberiidae
              - †Siberion
              - †Megadictyon
              - †Jianshanopodia
            - - - †Pambdelurion
                - †Kerygmachelidae
              - - †Opabiniidae
                - - †Radiodonta (e.g. Anomalocaris)
                  - Deuteropoda (modern arthropods)
