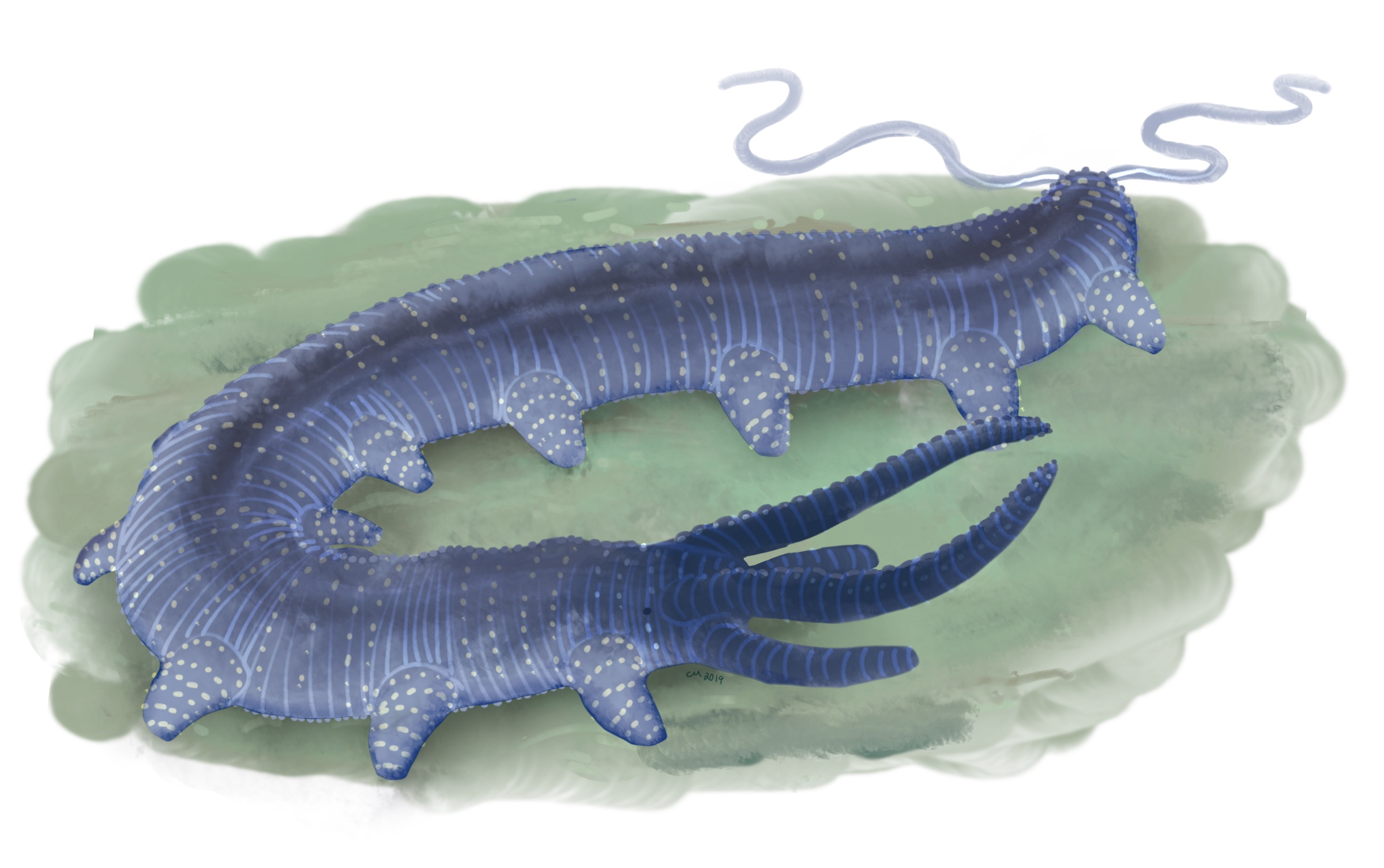
- Life restoration

Scientific classification
- Kingdom: Animalia
- Clade: Panarthropoda
- Stem group: Onychophora
- Genus: †Antennacanthopodia; Ou et al., 2011
- Species: †A. gracilis

Binomial name
- †Antennacanthopodia gracilis Ou et al., 2011

= Antennacanthopodia =

Antennacanthopodia Temporal range: Cambrian Stage 3

Extinct genus of stem-onychophoran

Antennacanthopodia is a small lobopodian from the Chengjiang biota that dates to about 520 million years ago (Cambrian Stage 3). It is similar to the extant Onychophora (velvet worm) and is the only widely accepted stem-onychophoran lobopodian from the Cambrian period. Antennacanthopodia had 9 pairs of stubby legs, a pair of potential ocelli, and two pairs of antennae. The first pair of antennae were much longer than the second and are still present in modern onychophorans. The identity of the smaller antennae are less clear, but they might be homologous with either the slime papillae or onychophoran jaw. The animal also had diminutive spines on its legs and trunk, highly sclerotized foot pads, and possible pair of tendril-like appendages at the end of its body.

== Discovery and naming ==
Both fossils of Antennacanthopodia were excavated from the upper Yu'anshan Member of the Lower Cambrian Heilinpu Formation. This is close to the famous Maotianshan Shales of China's Yunnan Province and probably makes them a part of the Chengjiang Biota.

The holotype (ELEL-EJ081876) was collected from the Erjie section of the Yu'anshan Member's Eoredlichia-Wutingaspis Biozone while the paratype (ELI-JS022643) was found in the Jianshan section. Both specimens date to around 520 million years old, placing them in the Cambrian Series 2 Stage 3.

Currently, the holotype is located at the Early Life Evolution Laboratory (ELEL) at the China University of Geosciences in Beijing, China. The paratype can be found at the Early Life Institute (ELI) at Northwest University in Xi'an, China.

The genus gets its name from the Latin words "antennatus" and "acanthopodus", referring to the fossil's multiple antennae and spiny lobopods. The species name is from the Greek "gracilis" meaning "slender" or graceful".

== Description ==
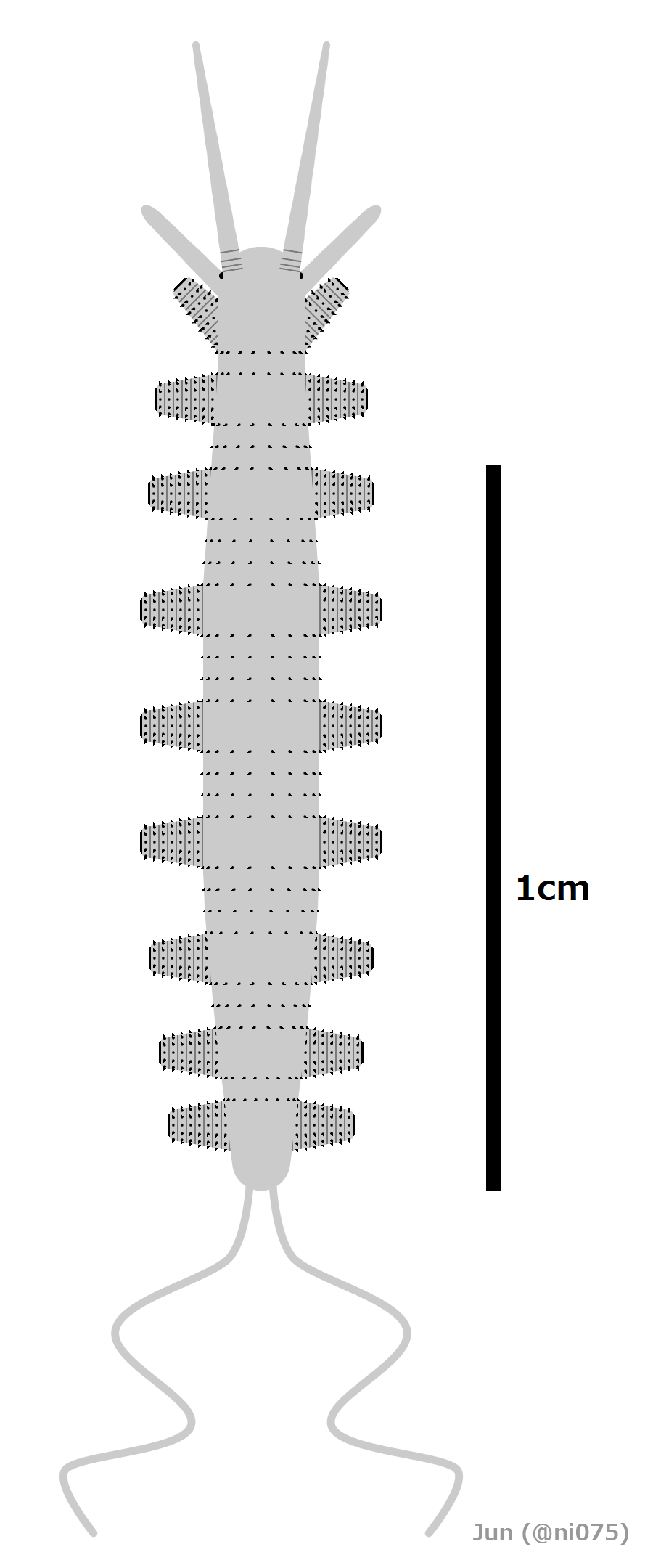
Antennacanthopodia reconstruction with putative cirriform structures

Both fossils of Antennacanthopodia were dorsoventrally compacted in mudstone, with the holotype being far better preserved than the paratype. Excluding any appendages, the holotype specimen is tiny, only 1.4 cm long. The fossils preserve soft tissues as a purplish black film and details of the sclerotized cuticle as a reddish-brown.

=== Head ===
Antennacanthopodia had two pairs of antennae. The first pair were double the length of the head and 1/4th of the length of the body. They also preserved faint ridges at their base. The second pair was shorter than the first and is likely a modified appendage. However, which segment they correspond to is unclear, as apparently, the animal lacked jaws. In the animal's original description, the second antennae were hypothesized to be homologous with the slime papillae. Thus, they would be part of the third head segment. Accounting for the lack of jaws, later studies disagreed. Instead, they considered the antennae to originate from the second head segment.

At the base of the first antennae were a pair of rounded black specks. It can be reasonably assumed that these are ocelli, a type of simple eye found in modern velvet worms. When compared, these eyes have similar proportions relative to the body, have the same overall placement, and originate from the same segment of the head.

The position of Antennacanthopodia's mouth is unclear. A study on the panarthropod heads considered it to have a ventral-facing mouth based on ancestral character reconstruction. Still, due not being preserved in either fossil, this is only a hypothesis.

=== Trunk ===
Like with the rest of the body, the outline of the trunk is preserved by a reddish outer cuticle. The trunk is long and comprises nine segments, each bearing a pair of legs. After the legs, the trunk tapers off to an endmost projection with two tendrils known as "cirriform structures". The body's surface had rows of tiny spines, with four per segment. Spine rows were found on the dorsal and lateral sides from the second to fourth trunk segments. Because of this, the pattern of rows likely applied to the entire trunk. Unlike many other lobopodians, Antennacanthopodia lacked sclerotized plates or tube-like attachments on its back.

Inside the outer cuticle is a purplish black film separated by a sediment-filled void. The outer film is lighter, running along the cuticle and into the legs. Inside this is a straight black band that runs through the center of the body and takes up 50% of the trunk's width. The 2011 description interpreted the void as the animal's original body cavity, the lighter film as musculature, and the darker film as a simple midgut. However, later studies reject this. When looking at how modern velvet worms decay, the "body cavity" mentioned in the original description was likely a misinterpretation. Rather, it was a product of the procuticle breaking down early on and then separating from the outer cuticle. A similar thing applies to the musculature and midgut. The musculature is likely a shrunken epidermis, and the midgut was probably undifferentiated contents of the actual body cavity.

=== Legs ===
Both the holotype and paratype preserve 9 pairs of stubby, unjointed legs. These are splayed to the sides and slant slightly downward in the holotype. The original describers were unable to find any claws, but found that each leg had a highly sclerotized, disc-shaped foot pad. This pad might have helped the animal with walking and is likely homologous to those of velvet worms. The legs were circular and had small, conical spines arranged in at least 7 circlets per leg. Each circlet had around 10 spines that were distributed at equal distances. As you go from the base of the leg to where it meets with the body, the spines appear to get bigger. In its original description, the purplish-black lobes inside the leg's outer cuticle were interpreted as musculature. Similar to the trunk, this interpretation is likely wrong. Rather than leg musculature, these lobes are probably shrunken soft tissue of the original legs.

=== Cirriform Structures ===
Antennacanthopodia might have had a pair of tendril-like appendages at the end of the body. These are known as "cirriform structures", measure around 60% of the body's length, and appear highly flexible. Nevertheless, they may instead be ruptured body contents from later stages of decay.

== Classification ==
So far, Antennacanthopodia is the only widely accepted stem-onychophoran lobopodian from the Cambrian period. The affinity of other Cambrian lobopodians, especially outside those outside of the arthropod total-group, is heavily contested and varies from study to study. As such, Antennacanthopodia is critical in elucidating the origins of what is now a purely terrestrial phylum. It shows that many onychophoran traits (antenna with ocelli at their base, stubby legs with foot pads, modified second or third appendages) had already evolved in the Cambrian. However, as seen with Antennipatus, characteristics such as slime papillae did not evolve until later, likely after colonizing the land.

=== Phylogeny ===
The slightly simplified cladogram below is from a 2025 paper by Knecht et al. redescribing the lobopodian Palaeocampa anthrax.

- - †Diania
  - - †Lenisambulatrix
    - - - †Paucipodia
        - - †Thanahita
          - - †Eoconchariidae
              - †Microdictyon
              - †Fusuchoncharium
              - †Quadratapora
            - - - †Xenusion
                - †Onychodictyon
              - - †Strictocorniculum
                - †Rhombocorniculum
                - †Orstenotubulus
                - †Carbotubulus
                - †Hallucigenia fortis
                - †Hallucigenia sparsa
                - - †"Hallucigenia" hongmeia
                  - - †Cardiodictyon
                    - - Tardigrada (tardigrades)
                      - †Luolishaniida
                        - - †Ovatiovermis
                          - †Facivermis
                        - - †Luolishania
                          - †Collinsovermidae
                            - †EBS Collinsovermid (SAM P14848)
                            - - †Acinocricus
                              - - †Collinsovermis
                                - - †Collinsium
                                  - †Entothyreos
      - - †Aysheaiidae
          - †Aysheaia
          - - Soom Shale lobopodian (C1947)
            - - †Hadranax
              - †Palaeocampa
        - Antennopoda
          - - †Antennacanthopodia
            - Onychophora (velvet worms)
              - †Antennipatus
              - †Cretoperipatus
              - †Helenodora
              - Living onychophorans
          - - †Siberiidae
              - †Siberion
              - †Megadictyon
              - †Jianshanopodia
            - - - †Pambdelurion
                - †Kerygmachelidae
              - - †Opabiniidae
                - - †Radiodonta (e.g. Anomalocaris)
                  - Deuteropoda (modern arthropods)
