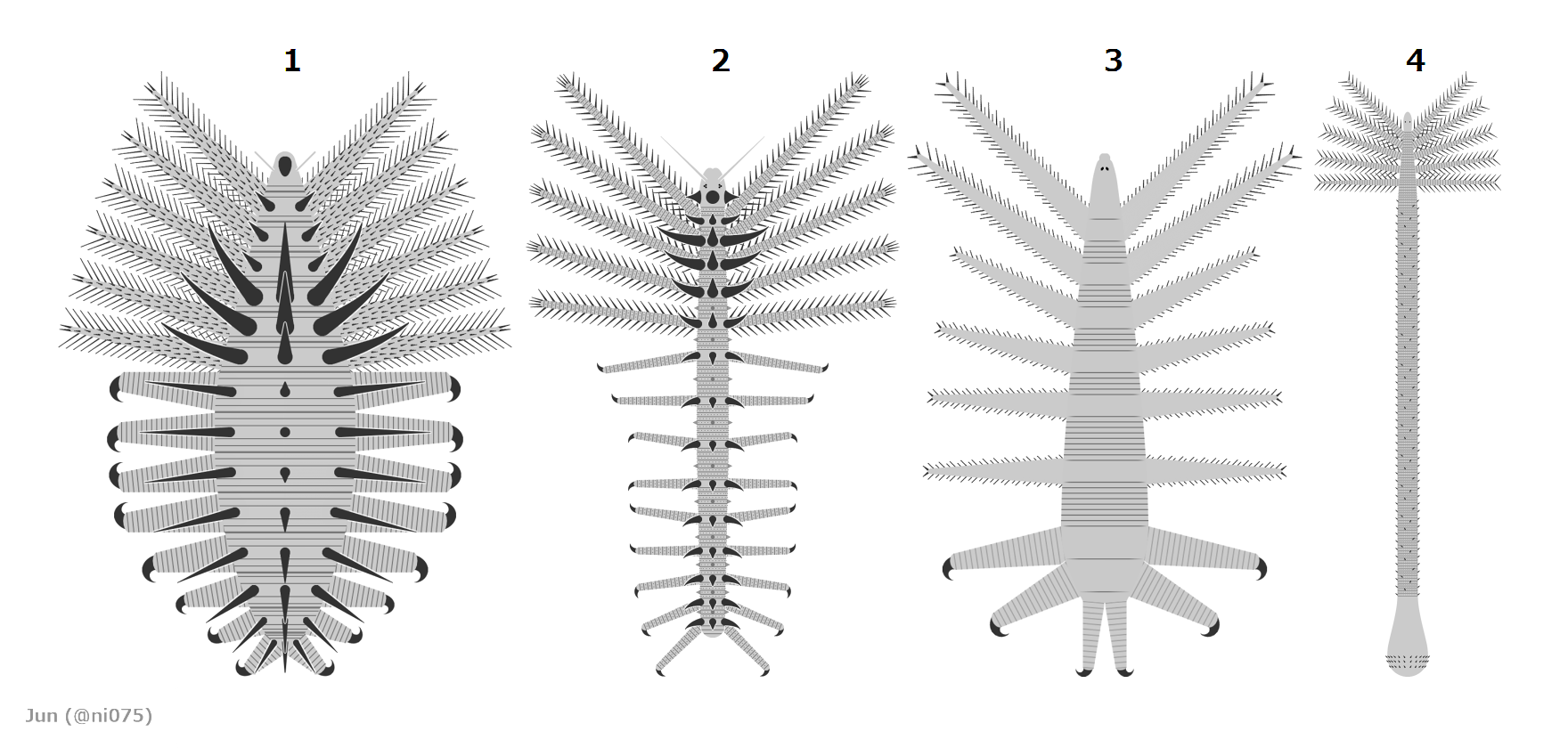
- (1) Collinsovermis, (2) Luolishania (= Miraluolishania), (3) Ovatiovermis, (4) Facivermis
- Video of Ovatiovermis anchored to a hold and filter feeding using its arms

Scientific classification
- Kingdom: Animalia
- Clade: Panarthropoda
- Phylum: †Lobopodia
- Clade: †Hallucishaniids
- Family: †Luolishaniidae

Families and genera
- †Collinsovermidae; †Acinocricus; †Collinsium; †Collinsovermis; †Entothyreos; †Facivermis; †Luolishania (=Miraluolishania); †Ovatiovermis

= Luolishaniidae =

Luolishaniidae Temporal range: Stage 2–Middle Cambrian

Extinct family of worm-like animals

The Luolishaniida (formerly Luolishaniidae) are an order of Cambrian lobopodians with anterior 5 or 6 pairs of setiferous lobopods. Most luolishaniids also have posterior lobopods each with a hooked claws, and thorn-shaped sclerites arranged as three or more per trunk segment. The type genus is based on Luolishania longicruris Hou and Chen, 1989, from the Chengjiang Lagerstatte, South China. They are presumed to have been benthic suspension or filter feeders. New specimens of the previously enigmatic Facivermis show that it was a sessile tube-dweller, and part of this group.

== Classification ==
A 2023 analysis concluded, on the basis of numerous morphological similarities, that members of Luolishaniida might be the closest known relatives of tardigrades. This was again confirmed in the 2025 redescription of Palaeocampa anthrax.

=== Internal phylogeny ===
Below is an internal phylogeny of the order after Knecht et al. 2025:

- Luolishaniida
  - - †Ovatiovermis
    - †Facivermis
  - - †Luolishania
    - †Collinsovermidae
      - †EBS Collinsovermid (SAM P14848)
      - - †Acinocricus
        - - †Collinsovermis
          - - †Collinsium
            - †Entothyreos

=== External phylogeny ===
Phylogeny of Panarthropoda and various lobopodians after Knecht et al. 2025:

- Panarthropoda "Lobopodia"
  - †Diania
  - - †Lenisambulatrix
    - - - †Paucipodia
        - - †Thanahita
          - - †Eoconchariidae
            - - - †Xenusion
                - †Onychodictyon
              - - †Strictocorniculum
                - †Rhombocorniculum
                - †Orstenotubulus
                - †Carbotubulus
                - †Hallucigenia fortis
                - †Hallucigenia sparsa
                - - †"Hallucigenia" hongmeia
                  - - †Cardiodictyon
                    - - Tardigrada (tardigrades)
                      - †Luolishaniida
      - - †Aysheaiidae
        - Antennopoda
          - - †Antennacanthopodia
            - Onychophora (velvet worms)
          - - †Siberiidae
            - - - †Pambdelurion
                - †Kerygmachelidae
              - - †Opabiniidae
                - - †Radiodonta (e.g. Anomalocaris)
                  - Deuteropoda (modern arthropods)
