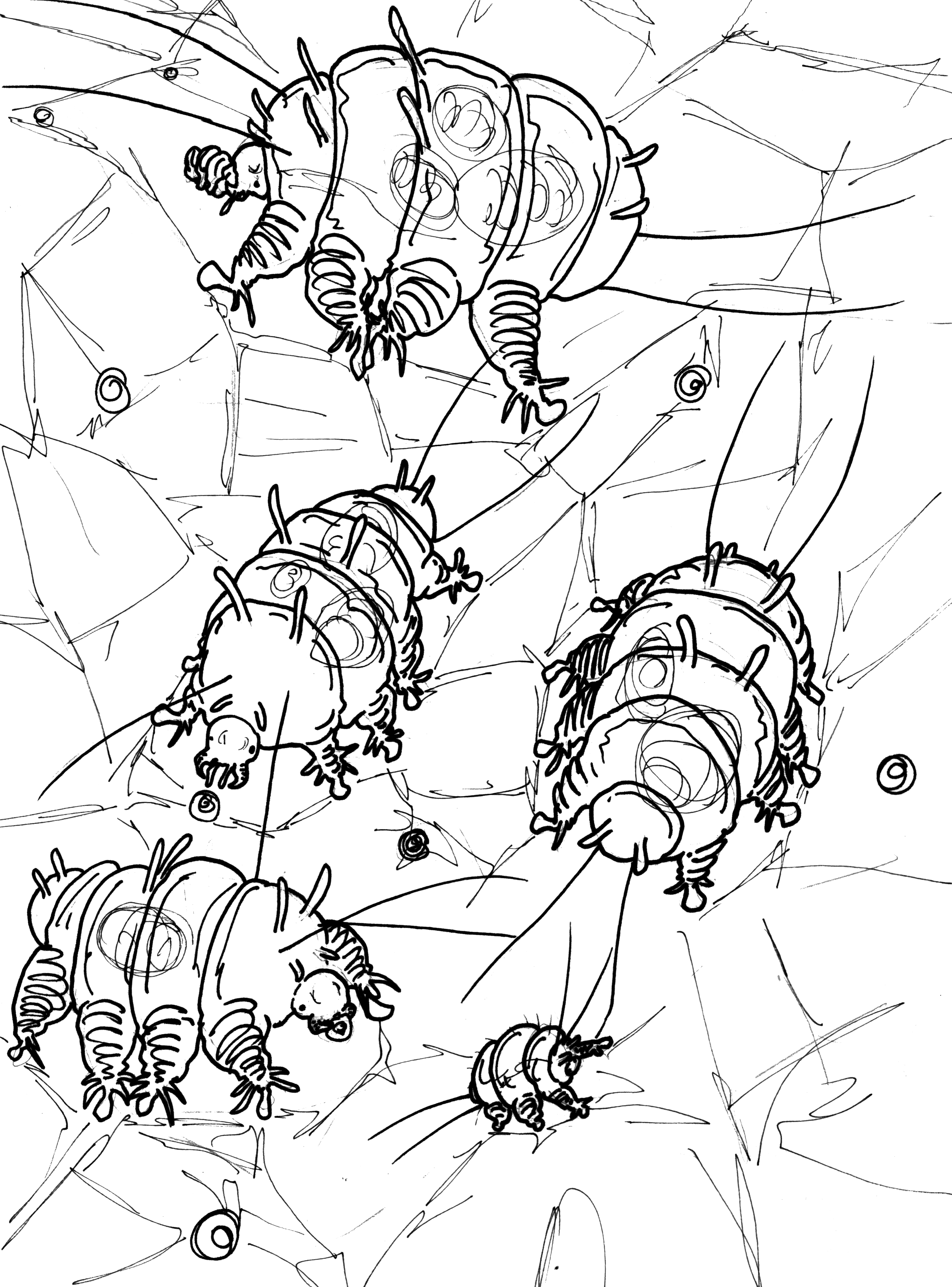
- Artist's restoration

Scientific classification
- Kingdom: Animalia
- Clade: Panarthropoda
- (unranked): incertae sedis
- Family: †Sialomorphidae; Poinar & Nelson, 2019
- Genus: †Sialomorpha; Poinar & Nelson, 2019
- Species: †S. dominicana

Binomial name
- †Sialomorpha dominicana Poinar & Nelson, 2019

= Sialomorpha =

Sialomorpha Temporal range: Paleogene–Neogene 45–15 Ma

Extinct genus of enigmatic invertebrates

Sialomorpha dominicana, also known as the mold pig, is a panarthropod genus of uncertain affinities discovered in 30-million year old Dominican amber by George Poinar at Oregon State University and Diane R. Nelson at East Tennessee University. It was placed in a new genus and family (Sialomorphidae) unto itself, and appears to represent a new phylum. S. dominicana shares some resemblance to tardigrades and mites. It is about 100 μm long and grew by molting its exoskeleton. It was probably an omnivore, feeding on minute invertebrates and fungi, including mold.
