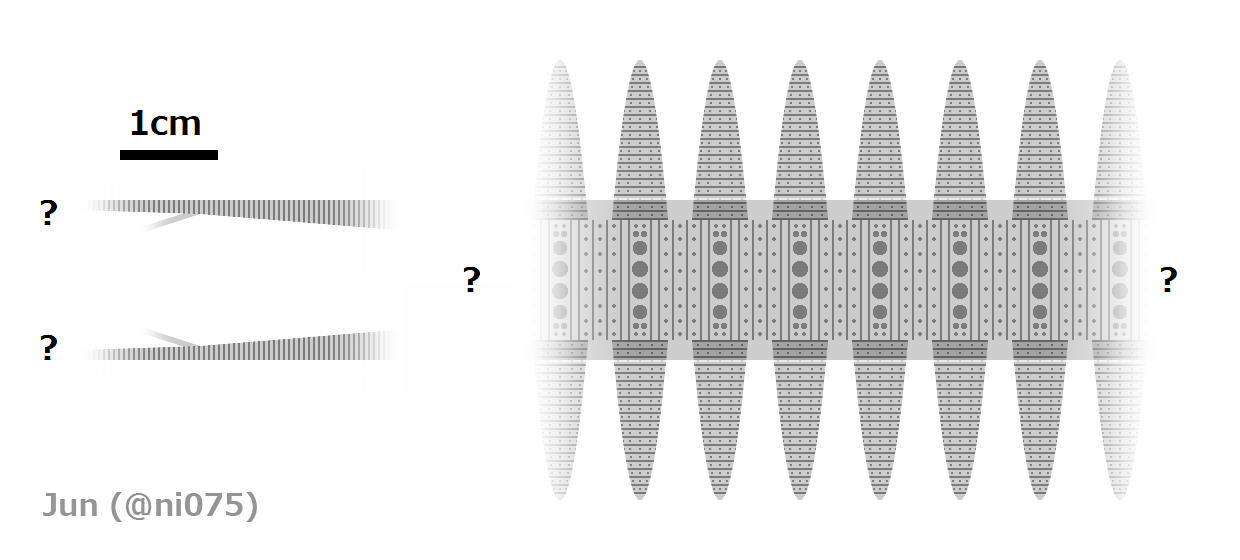
- Diagrammatic reconstruction
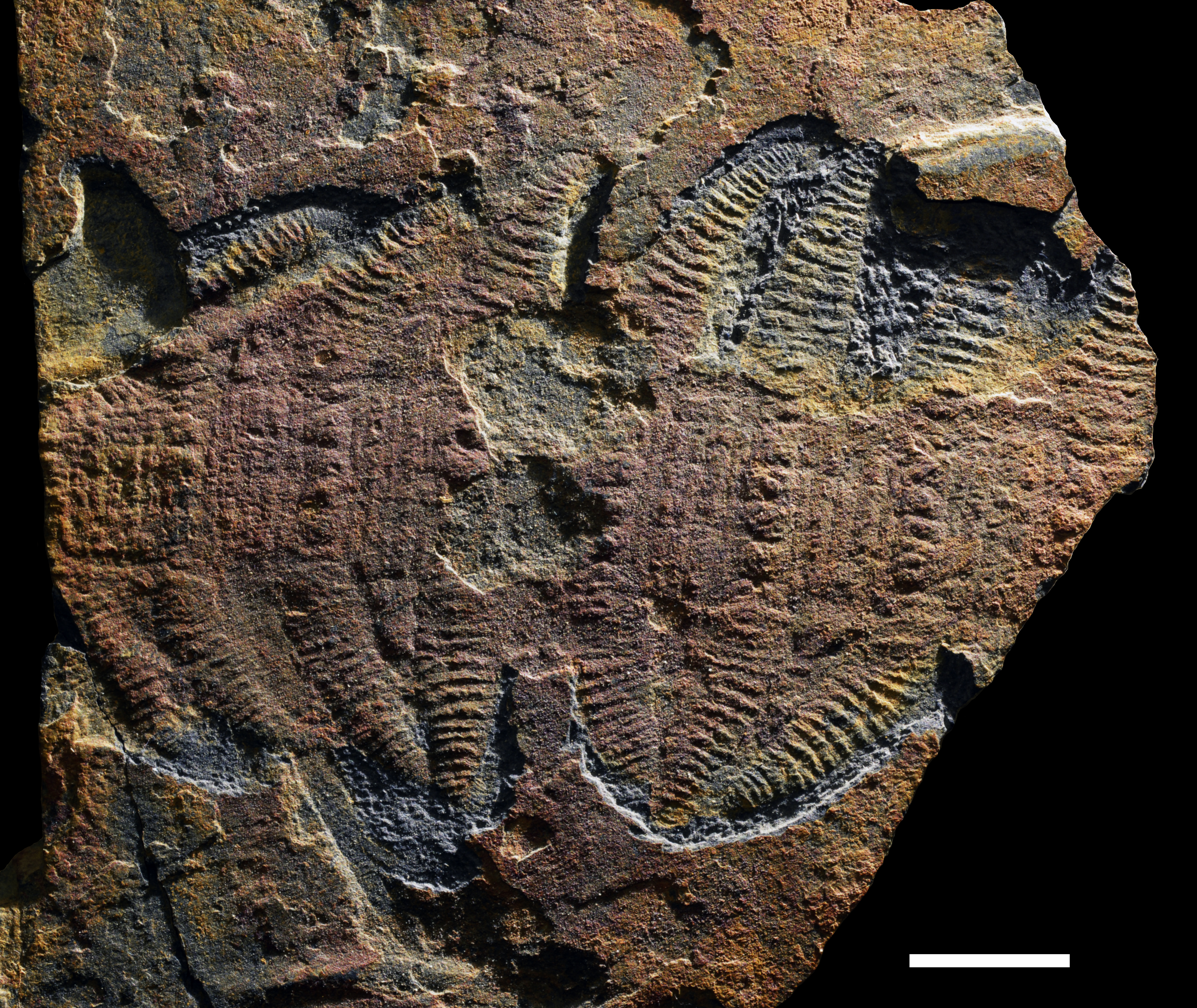
- Holotype fossil of Hadranax augustus.

Scientific classification
- Kingdom: Animalia
- Clade: Panarthropoda
- Phylum: †Lobopodia
- Genus: †Hadranax; Budd & Peel, 1998
- Species: †H. augustus

Binomial name
- †Hadranax augustus Budd & Peel, 1998

= Hadranax =

Hadranax Temporal range: Cambrian Stage 3

Extinct genus of large Lobopodian

Hadranax is a genus of large lobopodian known from the lower Cambrian Sirius Passet Lagerstätte. This genus is characterized from other lobopodians due to multiple groups of four nodes running along its trunk region, similar to Kerygmachela, and a pair of extremely large frontal appendages that were possibly as long as the animal's entire body. This lobopodian is one of the rarer members of the Sirius Passet fauna, with only around three fragmentary specimens being known.

== Discovery and Etymology ==
The first specimens of Hadranax were first discovered at the base of the larger Buen Formation, more specifically in areas of J.P. Koch Fjord in Northern Greenland. The holotype specimen, MGUH 24.527, consists of a partial body, including parts of trunk region and lobopods, as well as parts of the frontal appendages. Other specimens include MGUH 24.528, which may represent exuviae, and MGUH 24.529, which might represent a pair of isolated lobopods, and is only tentatively assigned to H. augustus.

The genus name, Hadranax, is derived from the Greek words hadros, meaning "sturdy" or "stout", and anax, meaning "ruler", due to this animals large size. The species name augustus, is derived from the month August, due to the find being the best one of the month.

== Description ==
This genus was very large compared to other lobopodians, with the largest known specimen reaching a length of around 69 millimeters (6.9 centimeters) long (excluding the terminal ends). However, Budd & Peel, 1998 speculates that Hadranax could've grown up to 150-160 millimeters (15-16 centimeters) long when taking into account both terminal ends. The trunk region was around 11 millimeters (1.1 centimeters) wide, and possessed at least eight rows of nodes running along it. Each row of nodes had an accompanying pair of lobopod-type limbs that were each around 17 millimeters (1.7 centimeters) long, and possessed at most twenty annulae. Although the exact number is unknown, this genus is thought to have possessed around twenty pairs of limbs in total. However, unlike some other lobopodians, this genus has no evidence of claws on its limbs. The large frontal appendages were around the same size as the animals full body, and were annulated. The appendages bore soft endites (spined structures) that were probably annulated to an extent.

== Paleoecology ==
During the lower Cambrian, the area that would become the Sirius Passet site sat under several hundred meters of water in either the mesopelagic, or bathypelagic zones. The ecosystem at the time would've been located near an oxygen minimum zone, which may explain the preservation of the fossils, and that the organisms in the area were killed during times of low oxygen levels. Sirius Passet is unique, as it shows the transition between ecosystems that dominated the earlier Cambrian, and ones that would come later. The ecosystem consisted of various groups, including arthropods, poriferans, chordates, gnathiferans, mollusks, annelids, priapulids, and other invertebrate groups. Alongside Hadranax, two other genera usually associated with the lobopodians are known, these being Kerygmachela and Pambdelurion. Unlike Hadranax, these two genera possess large lateral flaps on their trunk region, and were swimming in the water column. Due to its large size, Hadranax was most likely a dominant predator in the benthic environment. The large frontal appendages could've been used as sensory structures in order to help the lobopodian feel around its environment.
