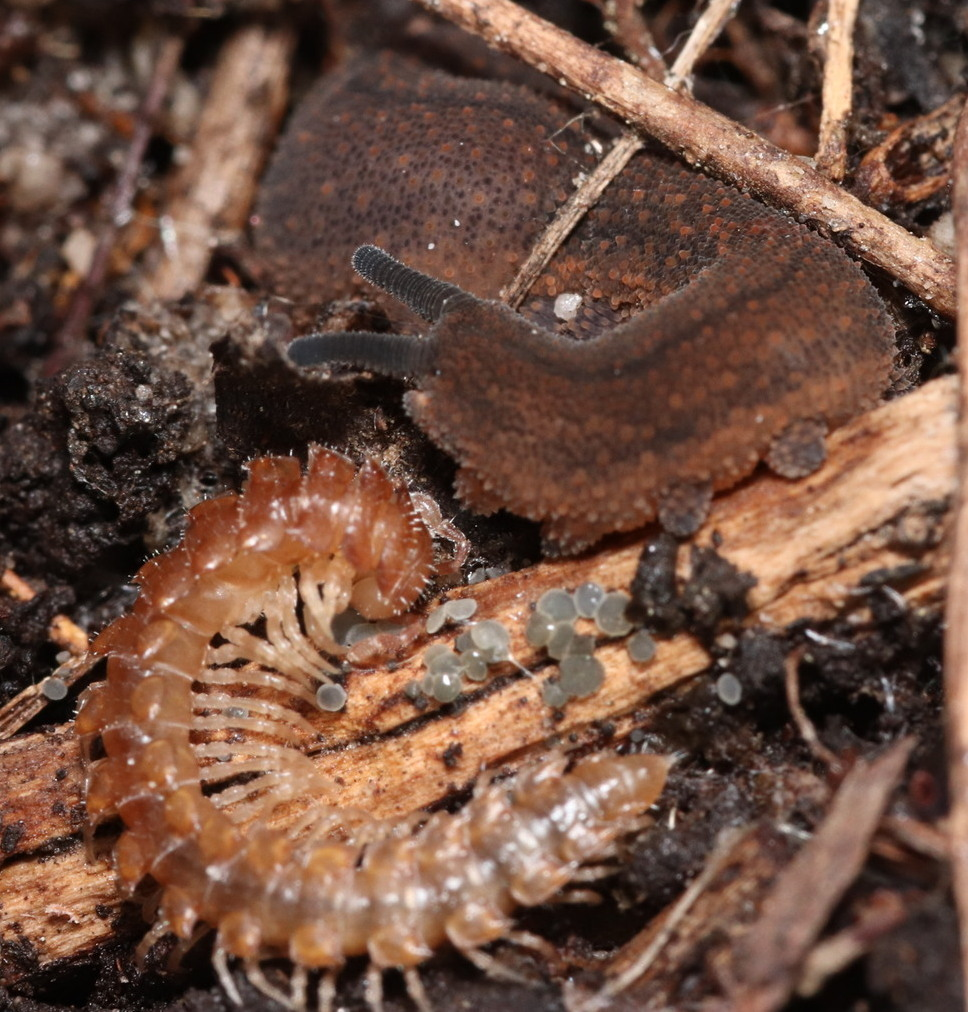
- Panarthropods include onychophorans such as Peripatopsis and arthropods such as polydesmid millipedes.

Scientific classification
- Kingdom: Animalia
- Subkingdom: Eumetazoa
- Clade: ParaHoxozoa
- Clade: Bilateria
- Clade: Nephrozoa
- Clade: Protostomia
- Superphylum: Ecdysozoa
- Clade: Panarthropoda; Nielsen, 1995

Phyla
- Onychophora; Arthropoda; Tardigrada; †Sialomorpha (possibly representing a new phylum); †"Lobopodia" (paraphyletic)

= Panarthropoda =

Panarthropoda Temporal range: Cambrian - Recent Molecular clock and ichnofossils indicate a possible Ediacaran origin

Clade of animals

Panarthropoda is a clade comprising the greatest diversity of animal groups. It contains the extant phyla Arthropoda (Euarthropoda), Tardigrada (water bears) and Onychophora (velvet worms), although the relationships among these remained uncertain according to studies published in 2023 and 2024. Panarthropods also include extinct marine legged worms known as lobopodians ("Lobopodia"), a paraphyletic group where the last common ancestor and basal members (stem-group) of each extant panarthropod phylum are thought to have risen. However the term "Lobopodia" is sometimes expanded to include tardigrades and onychophorans as well.

Common characteristics of the Panarthropoda include a segmented body, paired ladder-like ventral nervous system, and the presence of paired appendages correlated with body segments.

== Taxonomy ==
- Bilateria
  - Deuterostomia
    Echinodermata, Chordata and relatives
  - Protostomia
    - Spiralia
      Annelida, Mollusca and relatives
    - Ecdysozoa
      - Cycloneuralia
        Priapulida, Nematoda and relatives
      - Panarthropoda
        Onychophora, Tardigrada and Arthropoda

Not all studies support the monophyly of Panarthropoda, but most do, including neuroanatomical, phylogenomic and palaeontological studies. At least a close relationship between onychophorans and arthropods is widely agreed upon, but the position of tardigrades is more controversial. Some phylogenomic studies have found tardigrades to be more closely related to nematodes. Traditionally, panarthropods were considered to be closely related to the annelids, grouped together as the Articulata (animals with body segments), but subsequent phylogenomic studies consistently place them closer to cycloneuralians (nematodes, nematomorphs, loriciferans, kinorhynchas and priapulids), grouped together as Ecdysozoa. While annelids are placed among the Spiralia (making them more closely related to mollusks, flatworms and such), having evolved their segmented bodies convergently.

=== Interrelationships ===
There are three competing hyphotheses for the interrelationship between the extant panarthropod phyla, each known as Tactopoda (Arthropoda+Tardigrada), Antennopoda (Arthropoda+Onychophora), and the sister relationship between Onychophora and Tardigrada (Lobopodia sensu Smith & Goldstein 2017).

- Panarthropoda
  - Onychophora
  - Tactopoda
    - Tardigrada
    - Arthropoda

- Panarthropoda
  - Tardigrada
  - Antennopoda
    - Onychophora
    - Arthropoda

- Panarthropoda
  - Arthropoda
  - "Lobopodia" sensu Smith & Goldstein 2017
    - Tardigrada
    - Onychophora

Tactopoda had been supported by mitochondrial gene arrangements, palaeontological and neuroanatomical evidences, specifically the presence of segmented ganglia shared by arthropods and tardigrades.

Antennopoda united by the presence of specialized head appendages and deutocerebrum (additional second section of the brain), but subsequent anatomical studies suggest these features were convergently evolved between onychophoran and arthropod lineages.

Onychophorans and tardigrades shared some lobopodian traits (e.g. soft cuticle, lobopodous appendages and peripheral nerve roots), but these were generally considered to be plesiomorphies traced back to the last common ancestor of Panarthropoda or Ecdysozoa.

While most phylogenomic analyses support the monophyly of Panarthropoda, the results of interrelationship between the three phyla are less correlated—some of them inconsistently placing Tardigrada within Arthropoda, while the others mostly recovering either Antennopoda or Onychophora+Tardigrada. A genetic study published in December 2024 supported the sister relationship of Onychophora and Arthropoda.

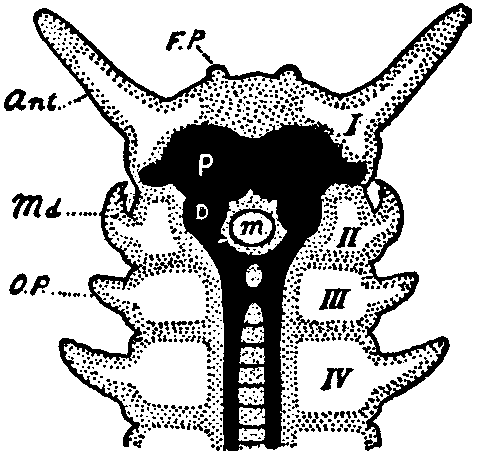
Anatomy of onychophoran anterior region, showing specialized appendages (ant, md) and deutocerebrum (D)

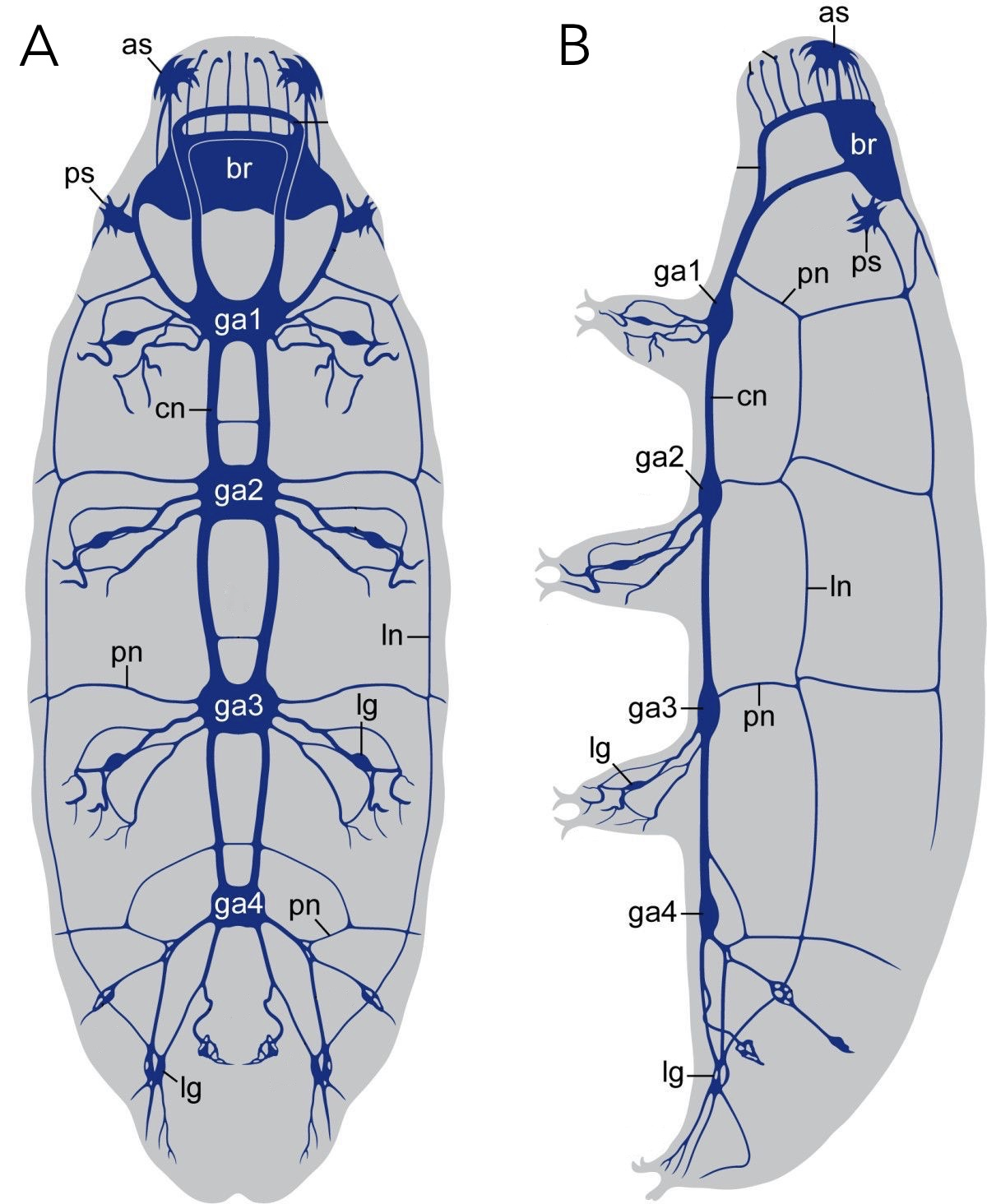
Nervous system of a tardigrade, showing ventral nerve cord with segmented ganglia (ga1-4)

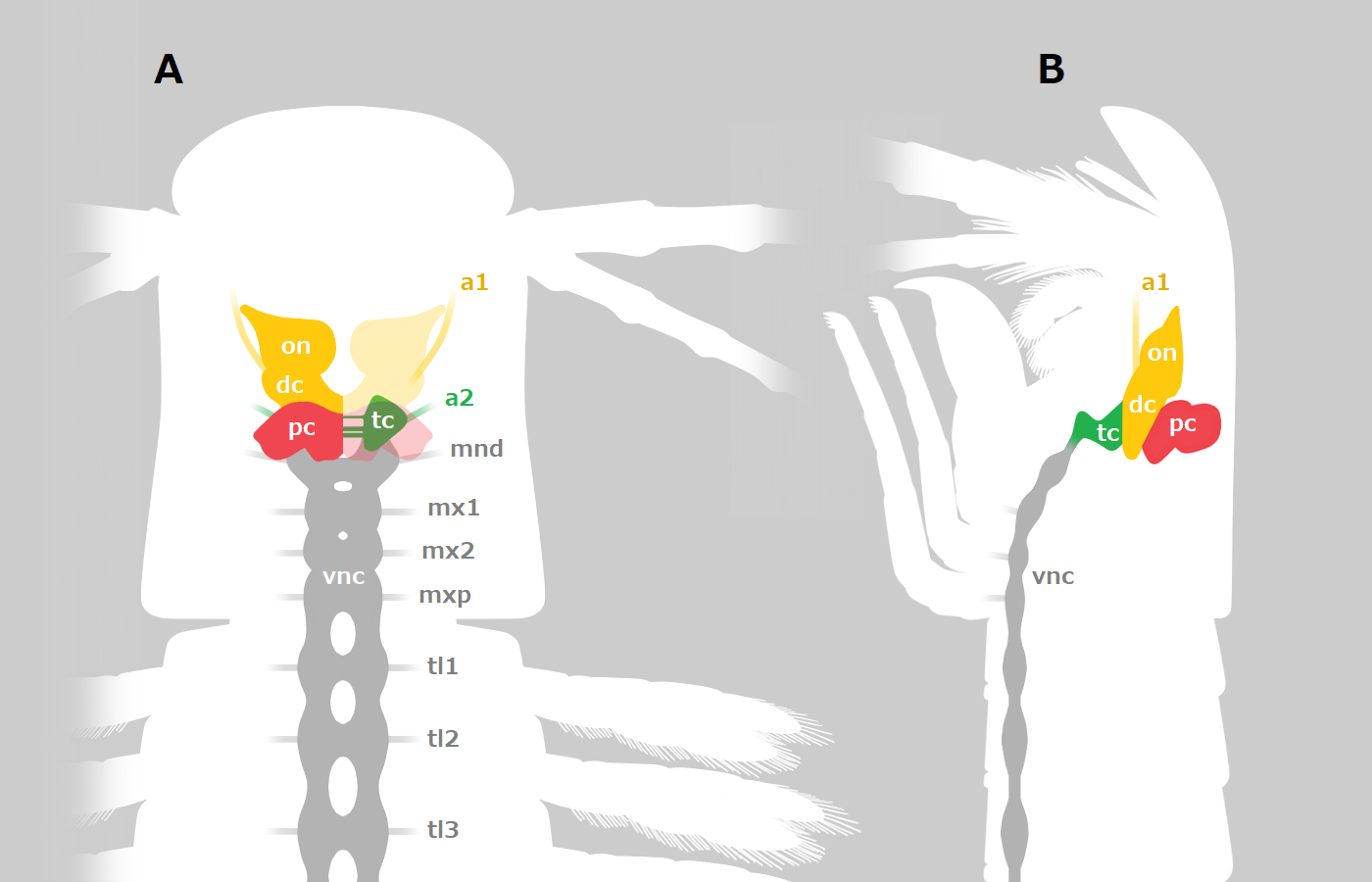
Nervous system of a remipede arthropod, showing the presence of both deutocerebrum (dc) and ventral nerve cord (vnc) organized by segmented ganglia

Sialomorpha, a genus of microinvertebrate discovered in Dominican amber in 2019, is also considered to be a panarthropod. However, due to the unusual combination of tardigrade and mite-like characteristics, its exact placement is uncertain.

== Phylogeny ==
Phylogeny of Panarthropoda after Knecht et al. 2025:

- - Priapulida
  - Cricocosmiidae
  - Panarthropoda
    - †Diania
    - - †Lenisambulatrix
      - - - †Paucipodia
          - - †Thanahita
            - - - †Eoconchariidae
              - - - †Xenusion
                  - †Onychodictyon
                - - †other hallucigeniids
                  - - †Hallucigenia hongmeia
                    - - †Cardiodictyon
                      - - Tardigrada
                        - † Luolishaniida
        - - †Aysheaiidae
          - Antennopoda
            - - †Antennacanthopodia
              - Onychophora (velvet worms)
            - - †Siberiidae
              - - - †Pambdelurion
                  - †Kerygmachelidae
                - - †Opabiniidae
                  - Arthropoda
                    - †Radiodonta
                    - Deuteropoda (modern arthropods)

== See also ==
- List of bilaterial animal orders
