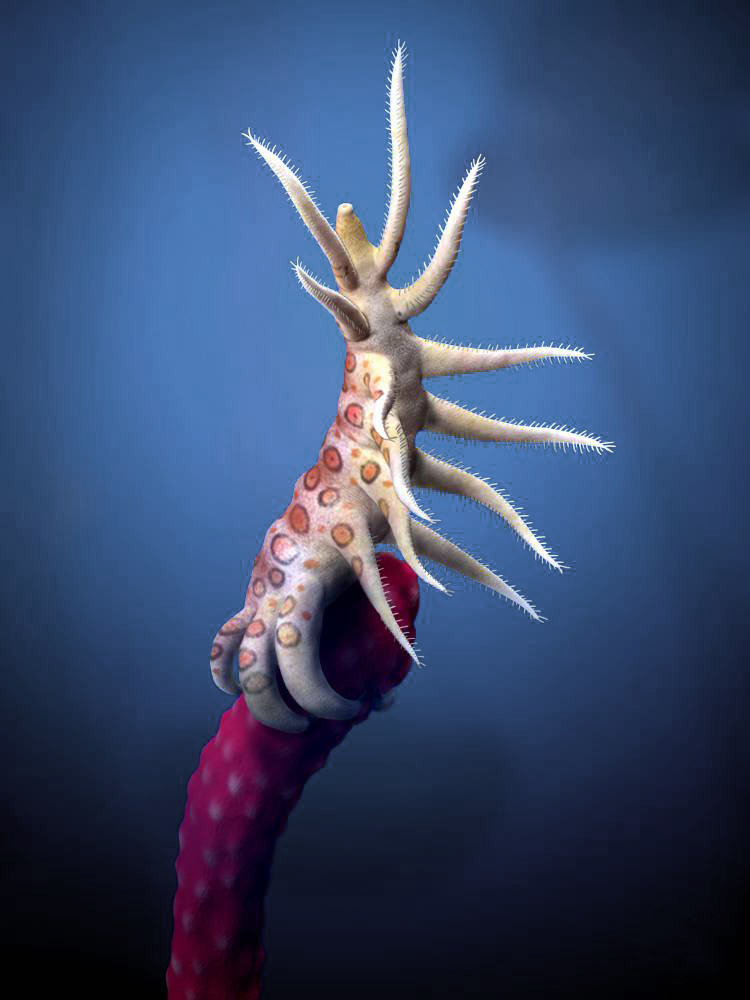
- Restoration of Ovatiovermis cribratus
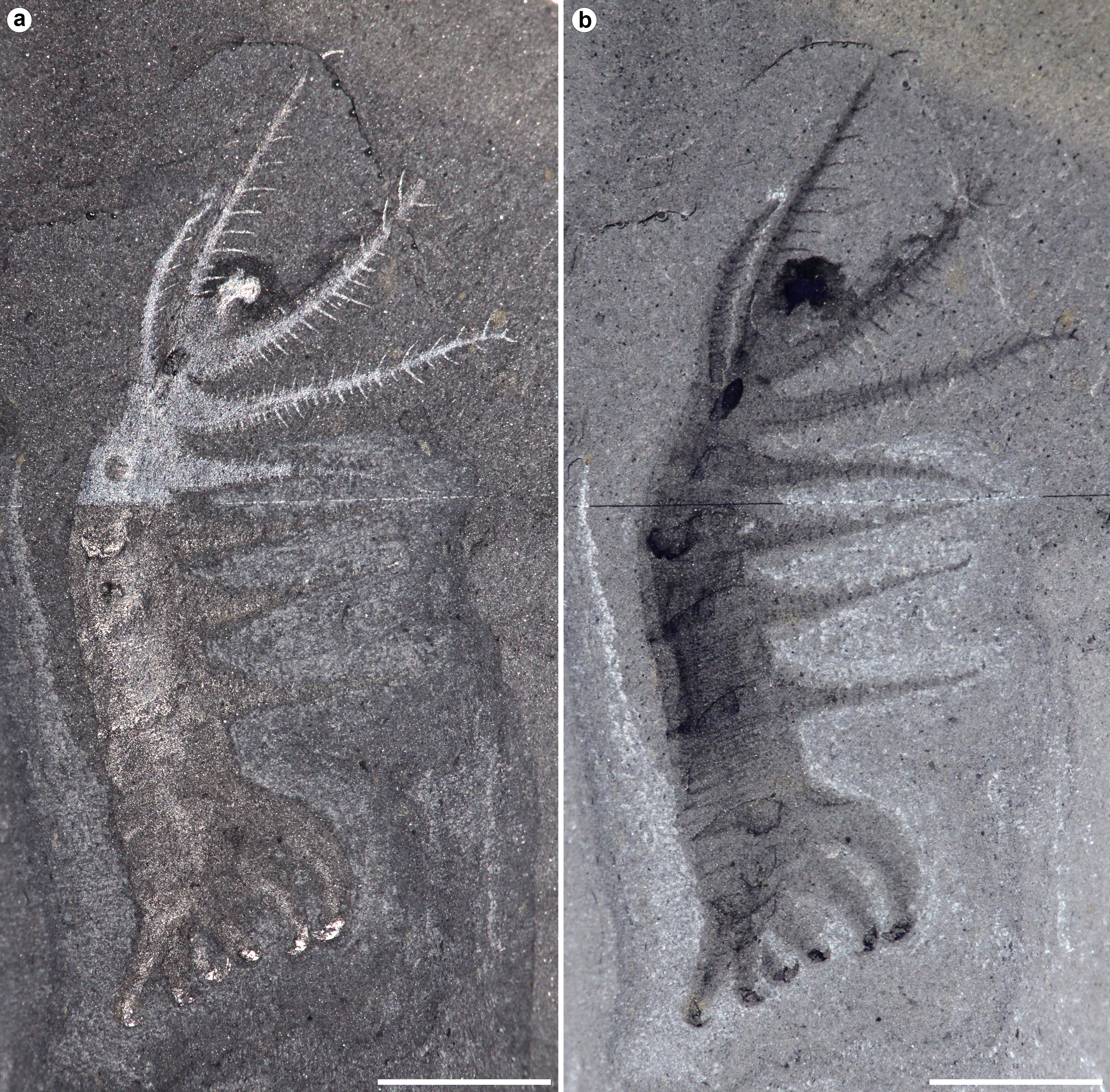
- Fossil holotype

Scientific classification
- Kingdom: Animalia
- Clade: Panarthropoda
- Phylum: †Lobopodia
- Family: †Luolishaniidae
- Genus: †Ovatiovermis; Caron & Aria, 2017

Type species
- O. cribratus Caron & Aria, 2017

= Ovatiovermis =

Ovatiovermis Temporal range: Miaolingian

Extinct genus of tardigrades

Ovatiovermis is a genus of filter-feeding "luolishaniid" lobopodian known from the Burgess Shale. Like many lobopodians, it had nine pairs of lobopods (legs). It was well adapted to filter-feeding and probably did so from the nearest high vantage point.

== Discovery and naming ==
Ovatiovermis comes from the Latin 'ovatio' 'I clap' and 'vermis' 'worm'. This refers to the position it would have adopted when filter-feeding, standing on its rear pairs of lobopods and waving front limbs above its head. cribratus also comes from Latin, and means 'that which sieves'.

== Description ==
Animation of O. cribratus showing its presumed life posture in anchored position and frontal lobopods for suspension feeding

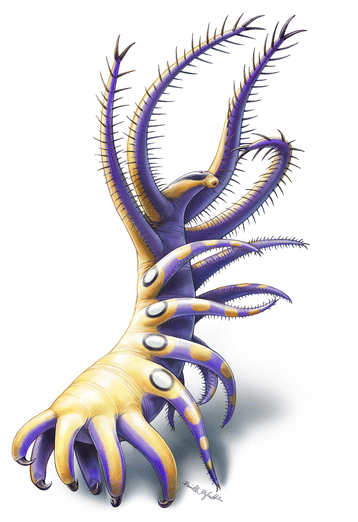
Illustration of Ovatiovermis

Ovatiovermis had nine pairs of lobopods. The first two pairs were elongate and had approximately 20 pairs of spines on each lobopod, with a bifid claw at each tip. The third to sixth pairs of lobopods were shorter and their paired spines were much smaller. On these four pairs of lobopods the spines were only large near the tip. The last three pairs of lobopods did not have the paired spines, showing that these spines were not used for filter-feeding. Instead these lobopods had hooked claws with which it could grip one of the corals or sponges found at the time and rear up into the current.

At the anterior end of the animal it had an evertible proboscis, with its mouth at the end. This would probably have been used to suck any particles of food which had been caught off the spines, possibly in a similar manner to a sea cucumber. Its head was not well separated from the body. Also on the head Ovatiovermis had two small (0.1mm diameter) and probably very primitive visual organs.

Close examination of the fossils revealed traces of calcium compounds in the claws of the back three legs and around the mouth and proboscis. There were also calcium traces found in the gut, but this may have been fragments of shell attached to its food rather than the animal`s organs.

== Evolutionary significance ==
Ovatiovermis was a member of the luolishaniid group of lobopodians. Caron and Aria, in their article on Ovatiovermis, suggest that both luolishaniids and hallucigeniids branched before the last common ancestor of extant panarthropod subphyla (Arthropoda, Tardigrada and Onychophora), rather than hallucigeniids and luolishaniids being closely related to onychophorans. This pushes the date for this splitting well back into the Precambrian.

All luolishaniids were filter-feeders, and this is one of the characteristics that they are classified by - the other is the small head and thick neck, unlike in hallucigeniids which had a bulbous head and a thin neck.

== Classification ==
Below is an internal phylogeny of Luolishaniida after Knecht et al. 2025:

- Luolishaniida
  - - †Ovatiovermis
    - †Facivermis
  - - †Luolishania
    - †Collinsovermidae
      - †EBS Collinsovermid (SAM P14848)
      - - †Acinocricus
        - - †Collinsovermis
          - - †Collinsium
            - †Entothyreos
