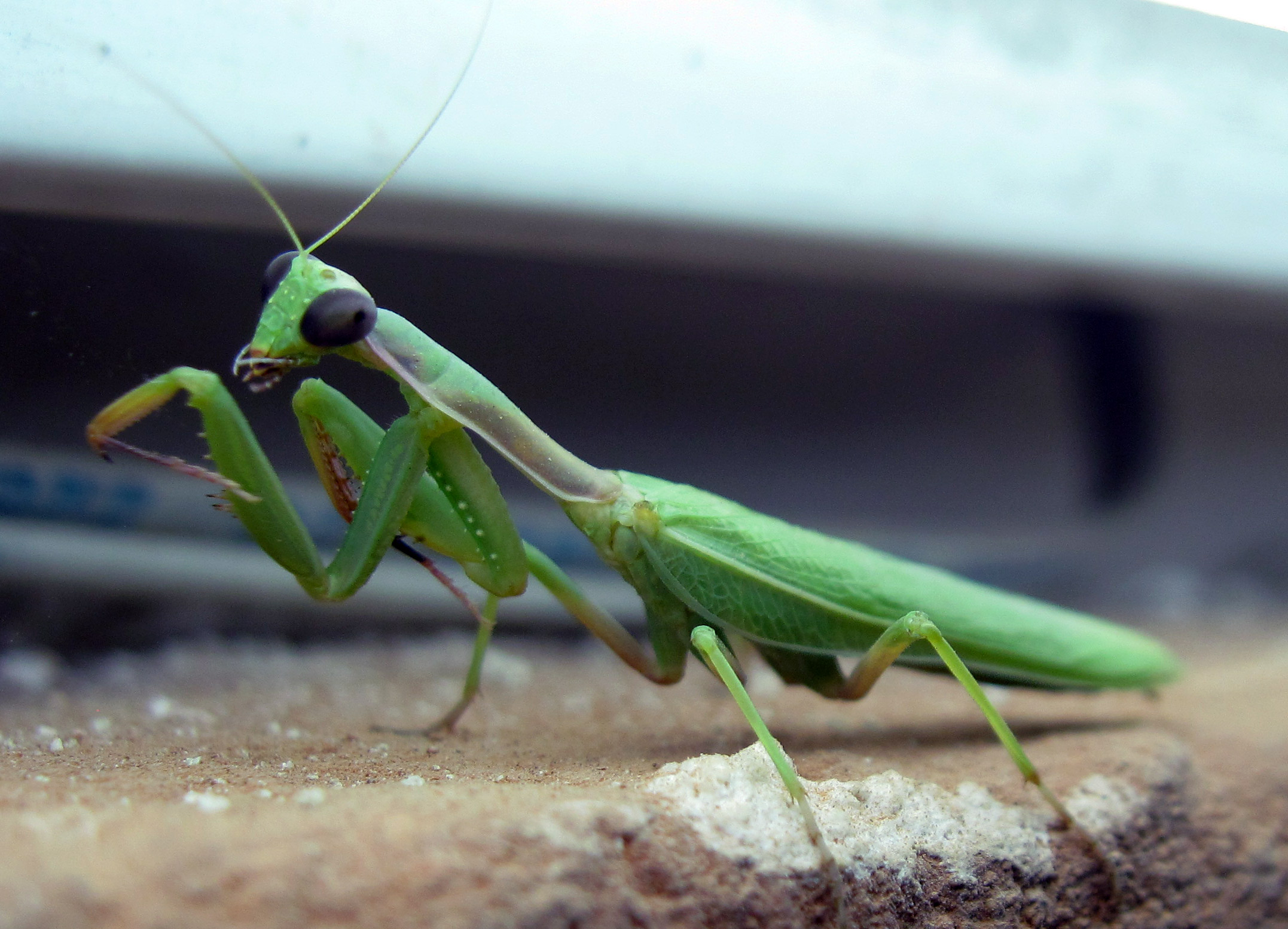

Scientific classification
- Kingdom: Animalia
- Clade: Panarthropoda
- Clade: Antennopoda; De Haro, 1998

Phyla
- Onychophora; Euarthropoda

= Antennopoda =

Antennopoda Temporal range: Cambrian–recent

Proposed clade of animals

The Antennopoda (or Arthropoda s.l.) are a proposed clade consisting of the Euarthropoda and the Onychophora, as sister of the Tardigrada, together forming the Panarthropoda.

- Panarthropoda
  - Tardigrada (Water bears)
  - Antennopoda
    - Onychophora (Velvet worms)
    - Euarthropoda

Antennopoda was defined by Andrés de Haro, where Tardigrada was not included in his tree. In a subsequent article, his use of Antennopoda was inconsistent with the current usage. Especially the position of the Tardigrada is disputed, the alternative hypothesis of Tactopoda includes tardigrades and arthropods as the sister group to velvet worms.
