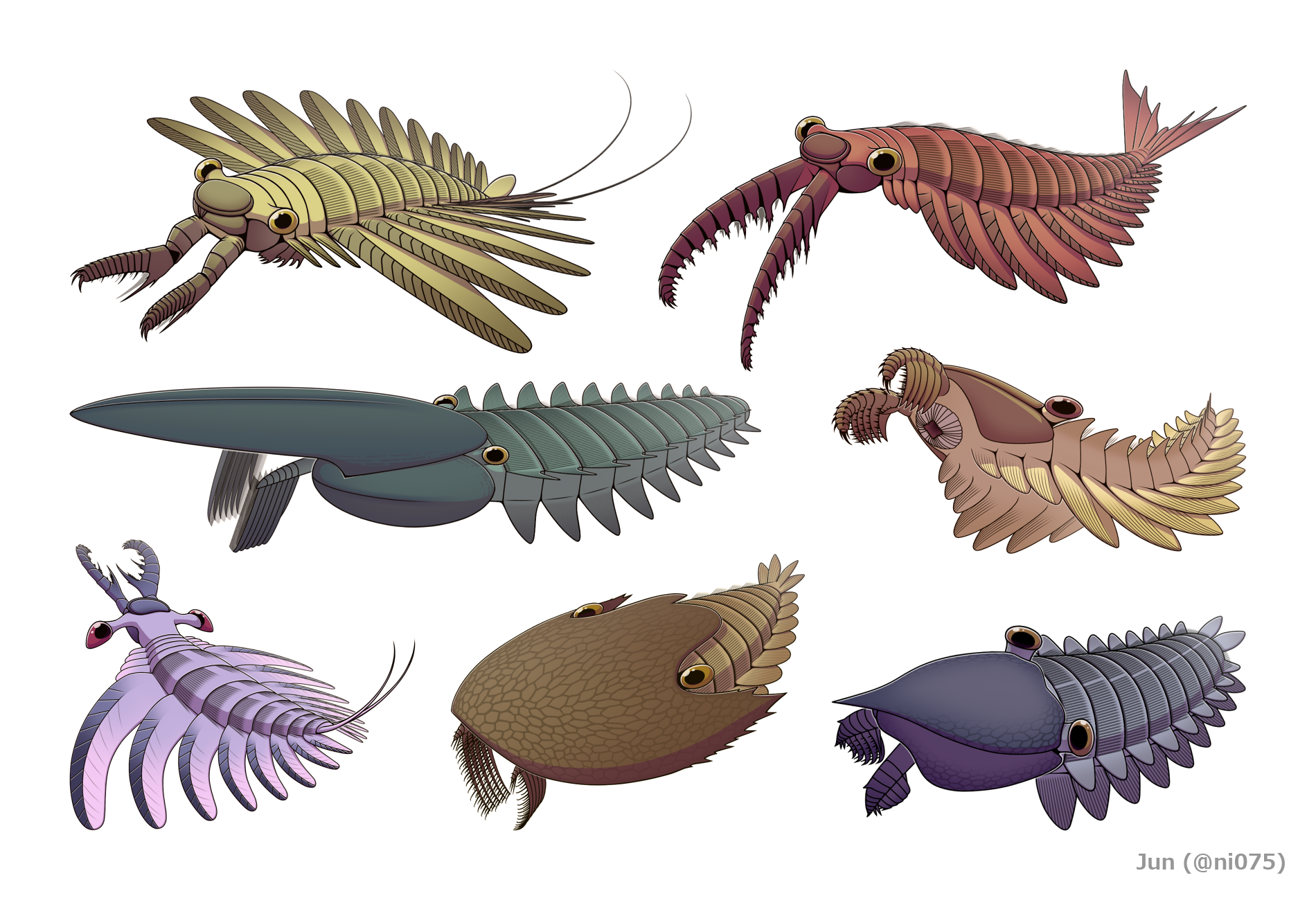
- Left to right, top to bottom: Amplectobelua symbrachiata, Anomalocaris canadensis, Aegirocassis benmoulai, Peytoia nathorsti, Lyrarapax unguispinus, Cambroraster falcatus, and Hurdia victoria

Scientific classification
- Kingdom: Animalia
- Stem group: Arthropoda
- Class: †Dinocaridida
- Order: †Radiodonta; Collins, 1996

Families
- †Anomalocarididae; †Amplectobeluidae; †Tamisiocarididae; †Hurdiidae; Genera with uncertain classification; †Caryosyntrips?; †Cucumericrus?; †Oreinorema?; †Houcaris; †Innovatiocaris; †Laminacaris; †Paranomalocaris; †Shucaris; †Zhenghecaris?

= Radiodonta =

Radiodonta Temporal range: Cambrian Series 2–Early Devonian

Extinct order of basal arthropods

Radiodonta is an extinct order of stem-group arthropods that was successful worldwide during the Cambrian period. Radiodonts are distinguished by their distinctive frontal appendages, which are morphologically diverse and were used for a variety of functions. Radiodonts were among the earliest large predators, and they also included sediment sifters and filter feeders. Some of the most famous species of radiodonts are the Cambrian taxa Anomalocaris canadensis, Hurdia victoria, Peytoia nathorsti, Titanokorys gainesi, Cambroraster falcatus and Amplectobelua symbrachiata. The later surviving members include the subfamily Aegirocassisinae from the Early Ordovician of Morocco and the Early Devonian member Schinderhannes bartelsi from Germany.

== Etymology ==
The name Radiodonta (Latin for radius "spoke of a wheel" and Greek for odoús "tooth") refers to the radial arrangement of tooth plates (oral cone) surrounding the mouth, although this feature is suggested to be absent in some radiodont species.

== Definition ==
The original diagnosis of order Radiodonta in 1996 is as follows:

Radiodontids are bilaterally symmetrical, elongate arthropods with a nonmineralized cuticle typically most robust in the jaws and claws. The body is subdivided into two tagmata, much like the prosoma and opisthosoma of chelicerate arthropods. Typically, the front part shows no external segmentation, bears one pair of preoral claws, a pair of prominent eyes, and ventral jaws with radiating teeth. Some forms have additional rows of teeth and three or four postoral gnathobasic limb pairs. The trunk is metameric, typically with about 13 segments laterally developing imbricating lobes for swimming and gills for respiration, and may end in a prominent three-part tail. Some forms have gnathobasic trunk limbs.

In 2014, the clade Radiodonta was defined phylogenetically as a clade including any taxa closer to Anomalocaris canadensis than Paralithodes camtschaticus. In 2019, it was redefined morphologically as animal bearing head carapace complex with central (H-) and lateral (P-) elements; outgrowths (endites) from frontal appendages bearing auxiliary spines; and reduced anterior flaps or bands of lamellae (setal blades) and strong tapering of body from anterior to posterior.

Members of Radiodonta are known as radiodonts, radiodontans, radiodontids, anomalocarids, or anomalocaridids, although the last two originally refer to the family Anomalocarididae, which previously included all species of this order but is now restricted to only a few species.

== Description ==
Size of radiodonts

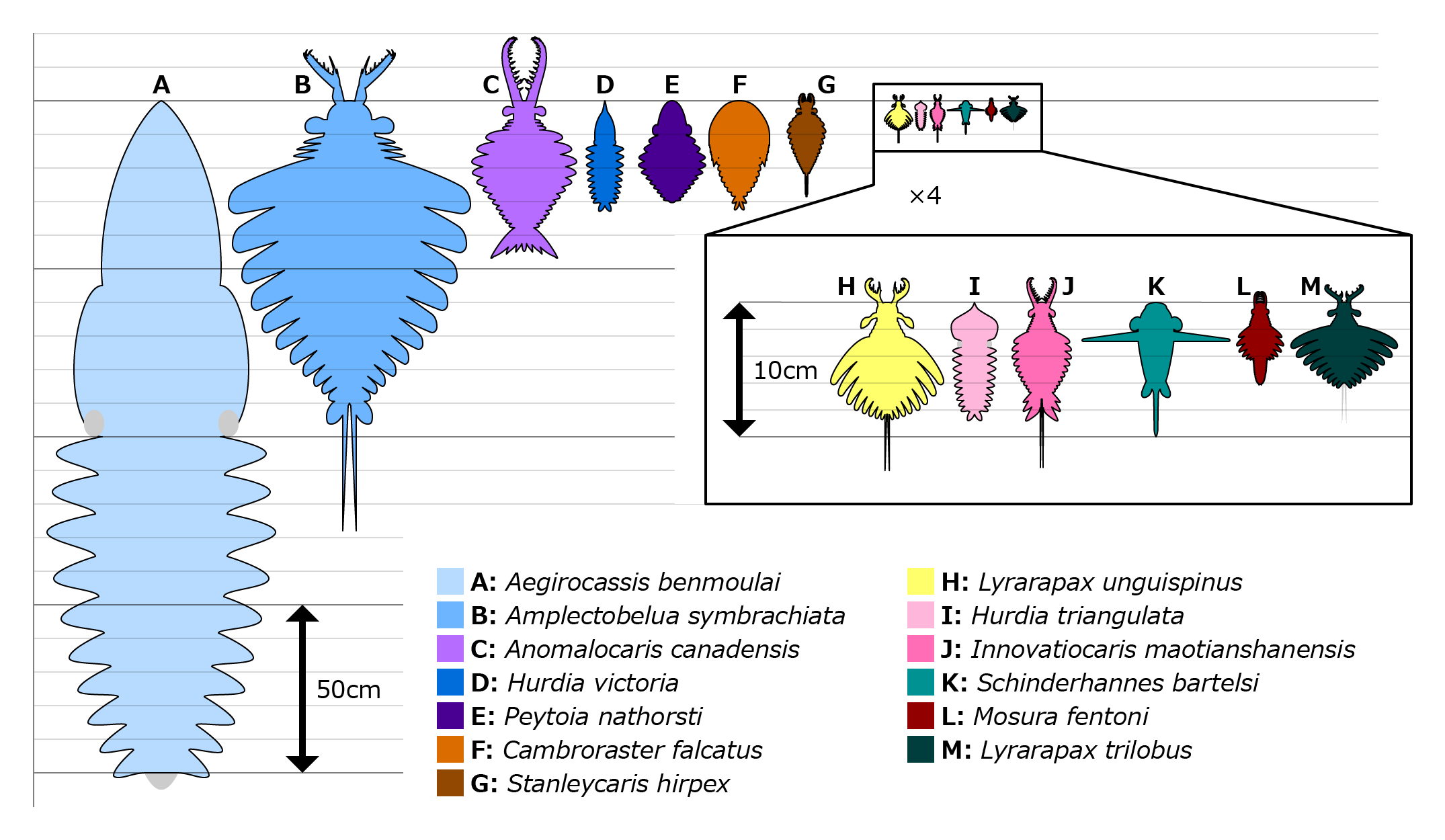
Size estimation and comparison of radiodont species known by nearly complete specimens

Size of Amplectobelua and Anomalocaris compared to humans

Size of Aegirocassis compared to humans

Most radiodonts were significantly larger than the other Cambrian fauna, with typical body lengths of large taxa varying from 30 to 50 cm (12 to 20 in). The largest described radiodont is the Early Ordovician species Aegirocassis benmoulai, which may have grown up to 2 m (6.6 ft) long. A nearly complete specimen of a juvenile Lyrarapax unguispinus measured only 18 mm (0.71 in), making it among the smallest radiodont specimens known, though adults reached a length of 8.3 cm (3.3 in) An isolated frontal appendage of a hurdiid from the Ordovician with a length less than half that of the juvenile Lyrarapax is known, but it is not known whether this specimen pertains to an adult. The largest known Cambrian radiodont was Amplectobelua symbrachiata, reaching lengths of up to 90 cm (35 in) based on an incomplete specimen. Anomalocaris canadensis was also relatively large, estimated up to 34.2–37.8 cm (13.5–14.9 in) long, and the Cambrian hurdiid Titanokorys approached around 50 cm (20 in) long.

The body of a radiodont could be divided into two regions: head and trunk. The head is composed of only one body segment known as the ocular somite, covered by sclerites (head carapace complex), bore arthropodized frontal appendages, ventral mouthparts (oral cone), and stalked compound eyes. The tapering trunk is composed of multiple body segments, each associated with pairs of flaps and gill-like structures (setal blades).

=== Frontal appendage ===
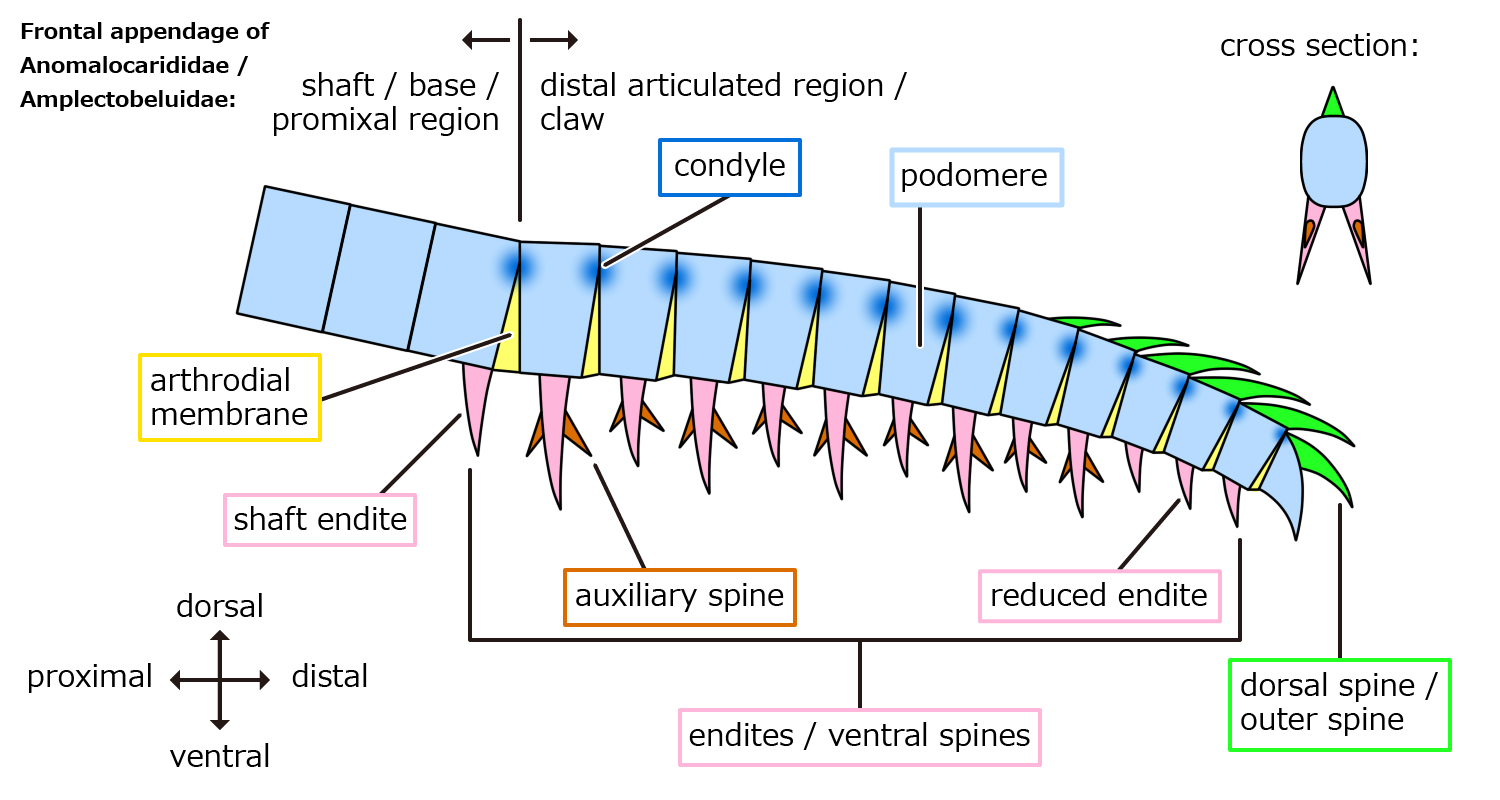
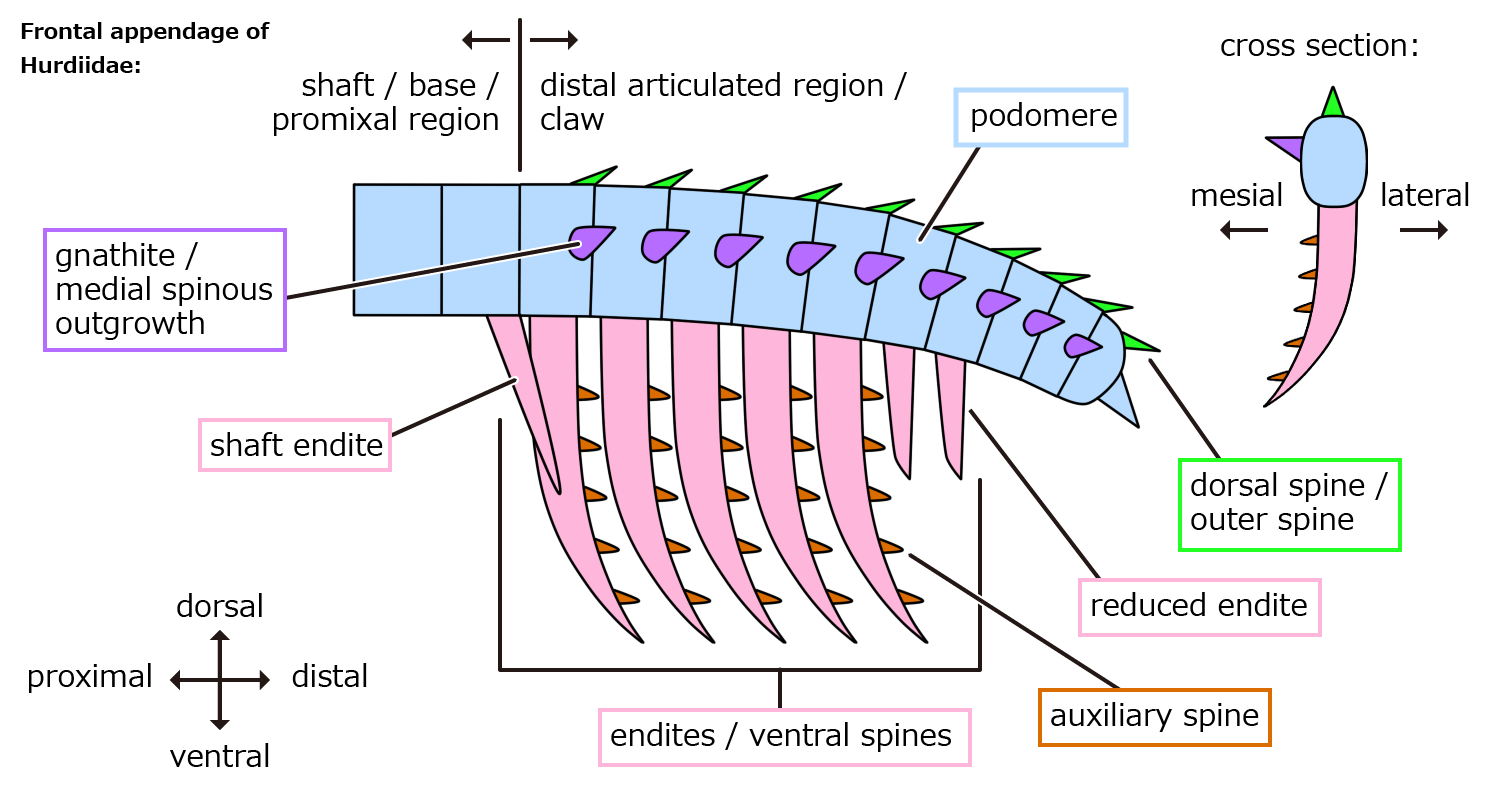
Frontal appendages morphology of the radiodont families Anomalocarididae/Amplectobeluidae and Hurdiidae

The anterior structures on the head are a pair of frontal appendages which have been referred to as 'claws', 'grasping appendages', 'feeding appendages', or 'great appendages' in previous studies (the last term is discouraged since the homology between frontal appendages and the original, morphologically distinct great appendages of megacheirans is questionable.). They are sclerotized (hardened) and arthropodized (segmented), bearing ventral endites (spines) on most of their podomeres (segmental units), and the endites may bear additional rows of auxiliary spines on their anterior and posterior margins. The frontal appendage consists of two regions: the shaft ('peduncle', 'base' or 'proximal region' in some studies) and the distal articulated region (also referred to as 'claw'). A triangular region covered by soft cuticle (arthrodial membrane) may occur on the ventral side between podomeres and provide flexibility. Their purported pre-ocular and protocerebral origin suggest they are homologous to the primary antennae of Onychophora and the labrum of Euarthropoda (all arose from ocular somite), while subsequent studies also suggest a deutocerebral origin and homologous with the chelicerae of Chelicerata and the antennae or 'great appendages' of other arthropods (all arose from post-ocular somite 1). Since the morphology of the frontal appendages, especially those of the spines, always differs between species, it is one of the most important means of species identification. In fact, many radiodonts are only known from a handful of fossilized frontal appendages.

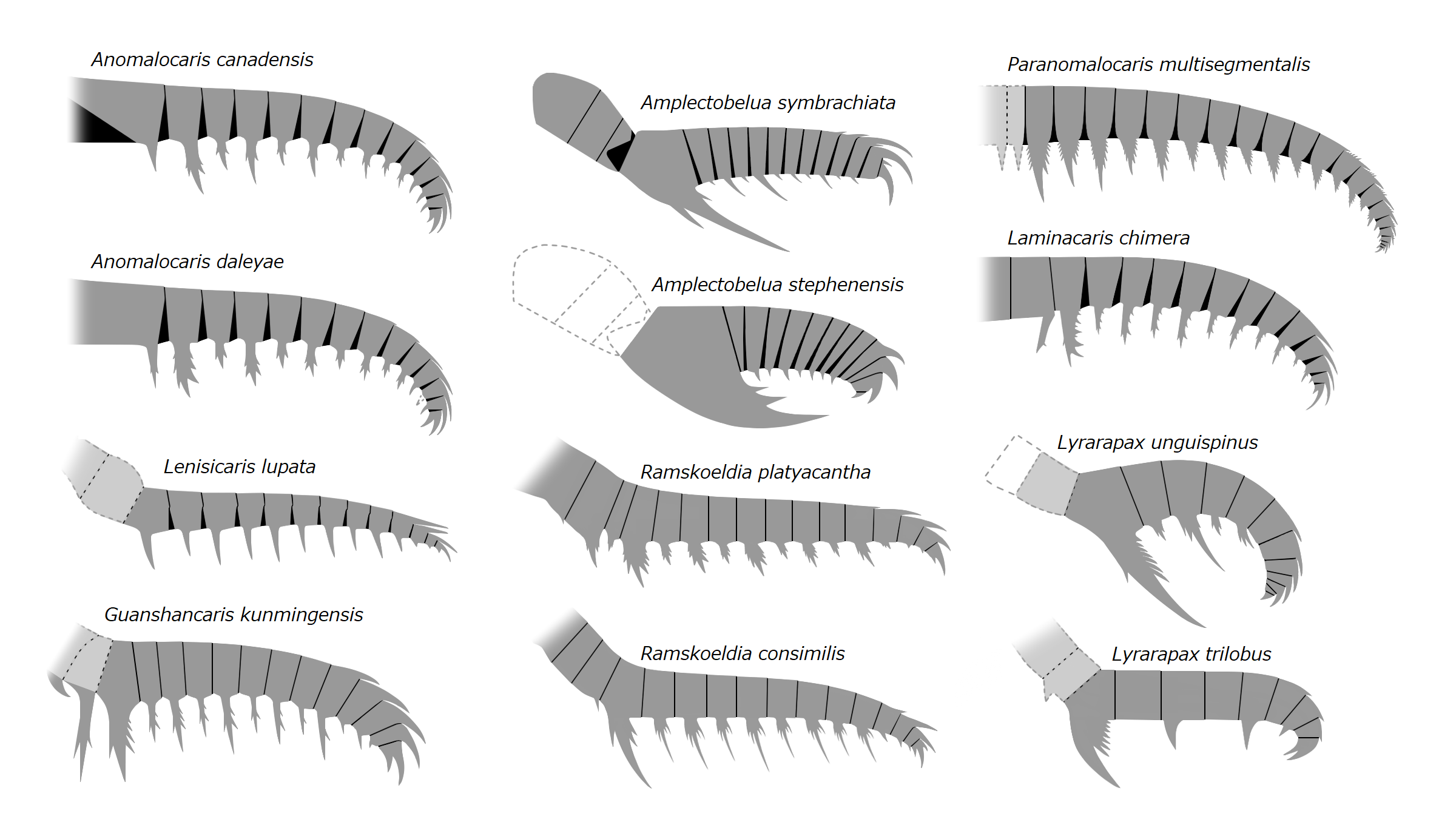
Frontal appendages of Anomalocarididae, Amplectobeluidae, and possibly related species

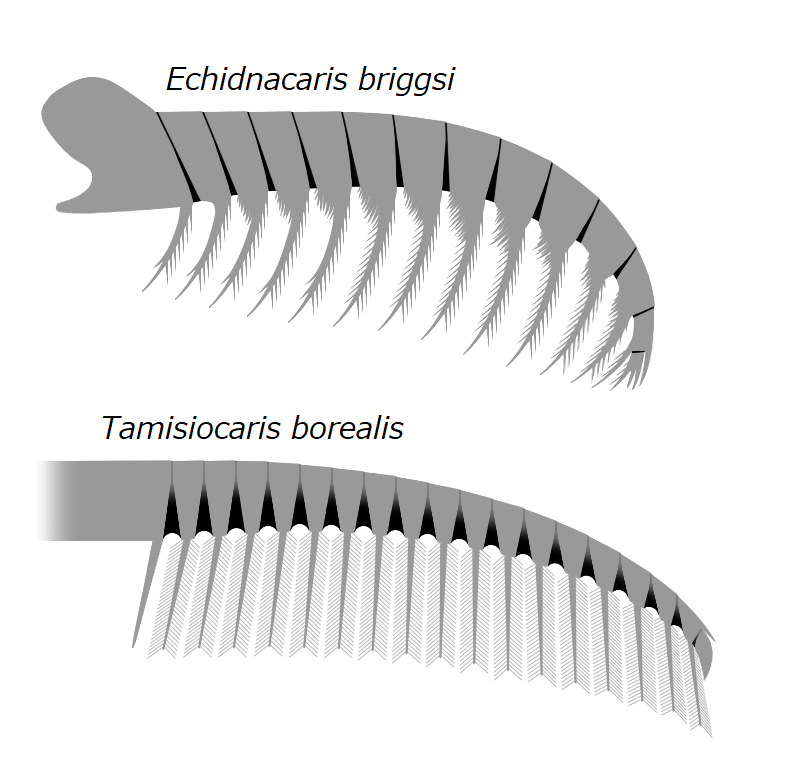
Frontal appendages of Tamisiocarididae

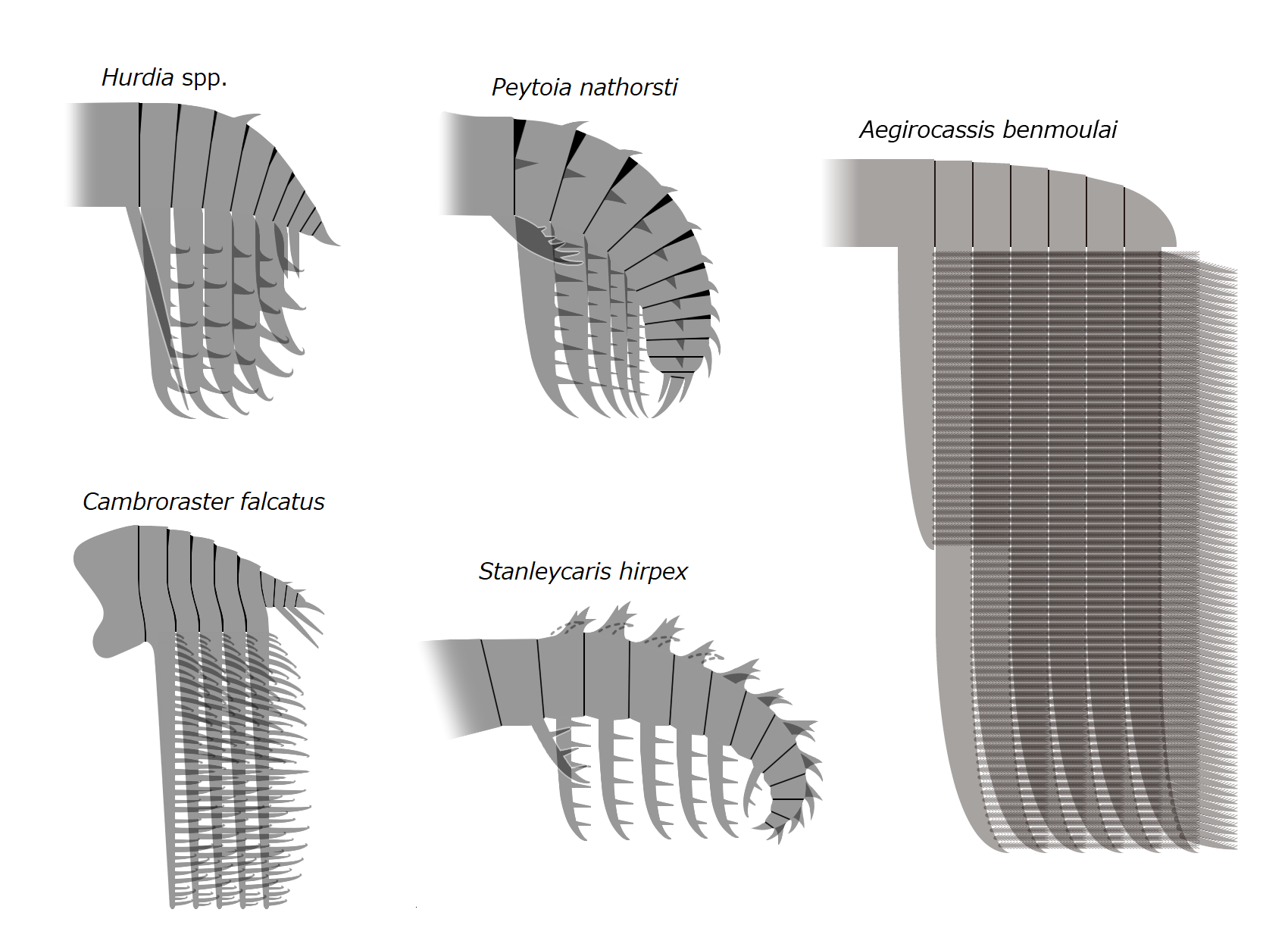
Frontal appendages of Hurdiidae

=== Oral cone ===
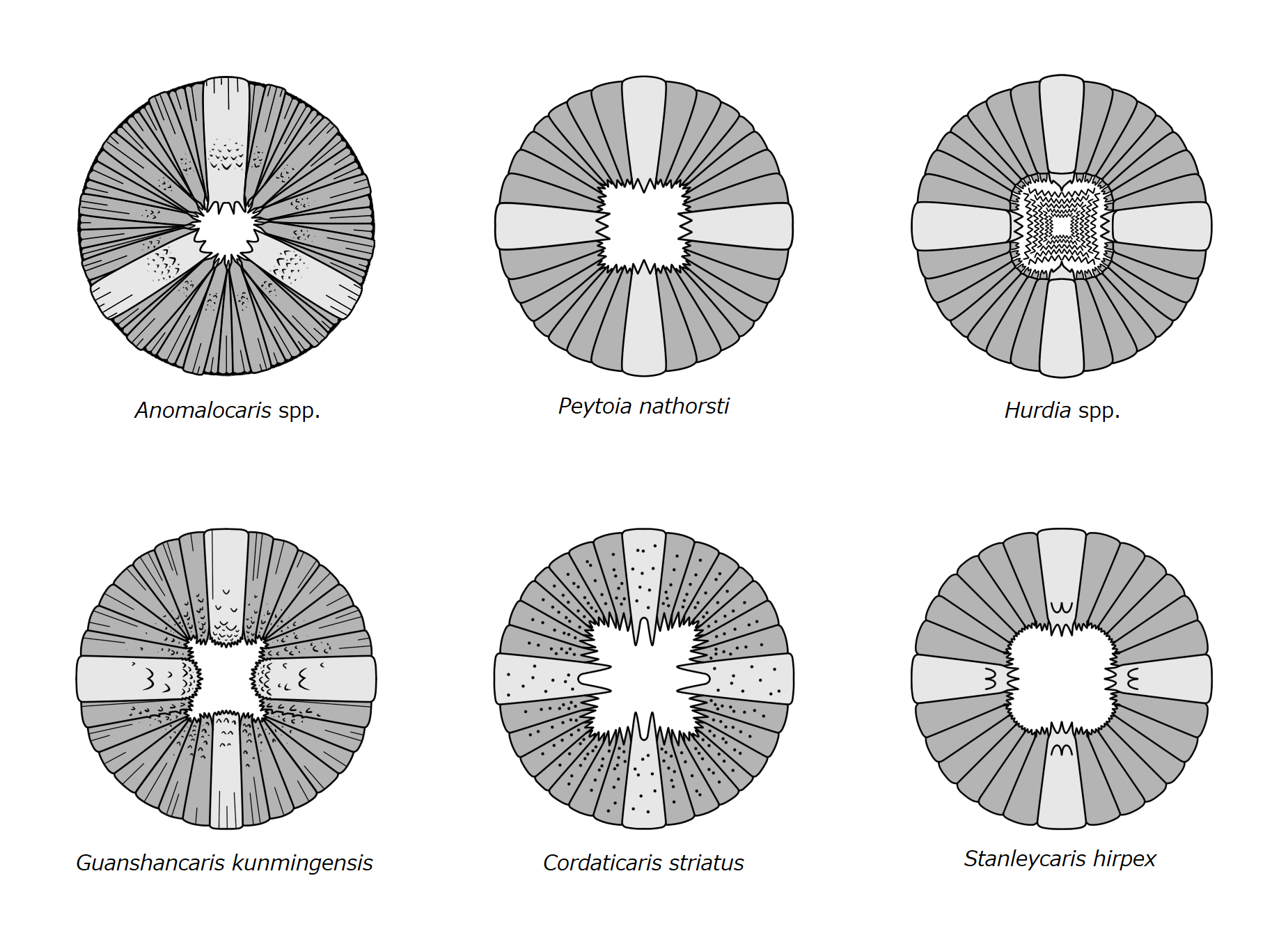
Oral cones of various radiodonts

The mouth is on the ventral side of the head, behind the attachment point of frontal appendages and is surrounded by a ring of tooth plates, forming the mouthpart known as oral cone ('jaws' in previous studies). Three or four tooth plates might be enlarged, giving the oral cone a triradial (e.g. Anomalocaris, Echidnacaris) or tetraradial (e.g. Hurdiidae, Lyrarapax) appearance. The inner margin of tooth plates have spikes facing towards the mouth opening. Additional rows of internal tooth plates may occur in some hurdiid genera. Detail reconstruction of some amplectobeluid oral cones are speculative, but they possibly did not present a typical radial arrangement.

=== Head sclerites, eyes and trunk ===
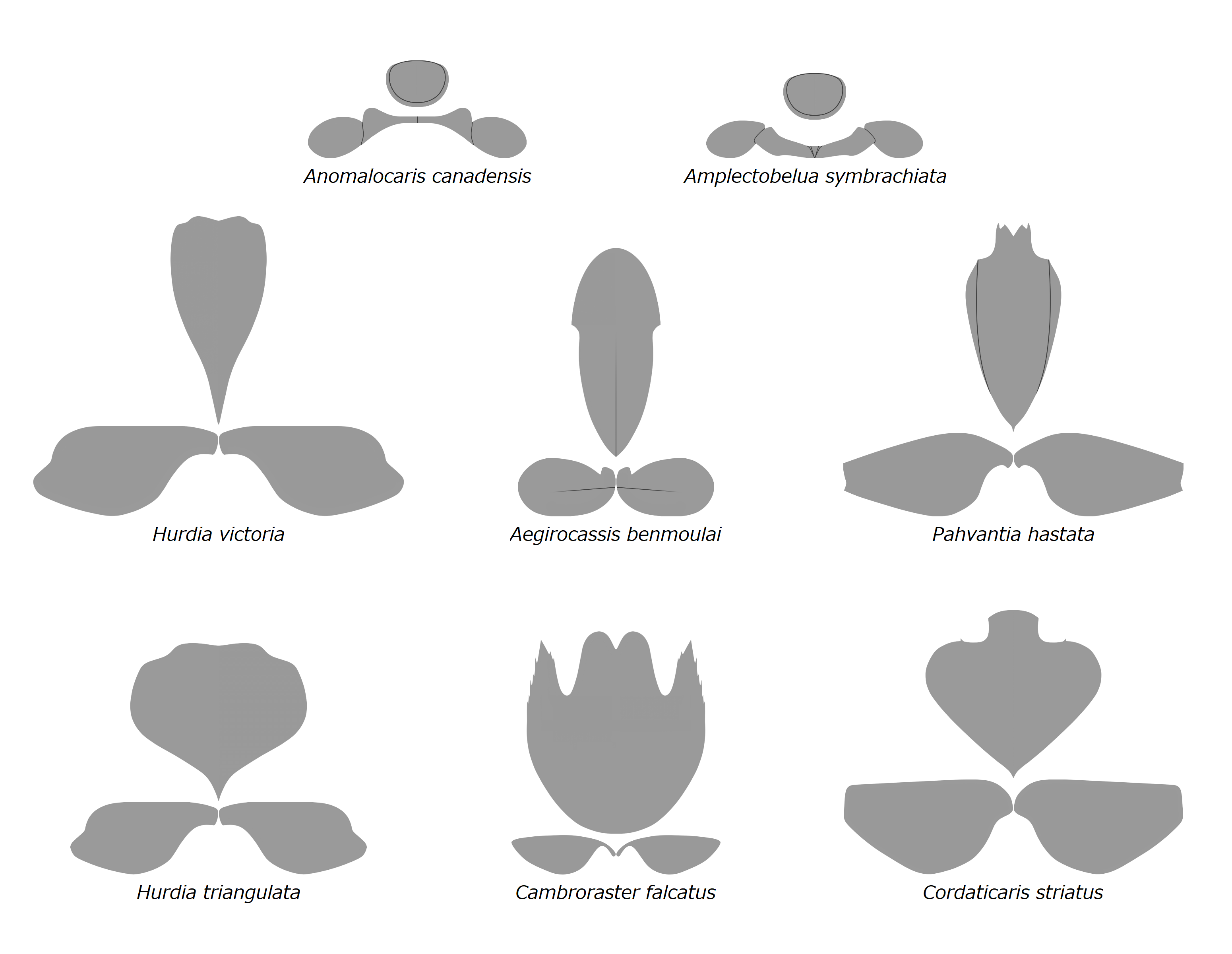
Head sclerite complexes of various radiodonts

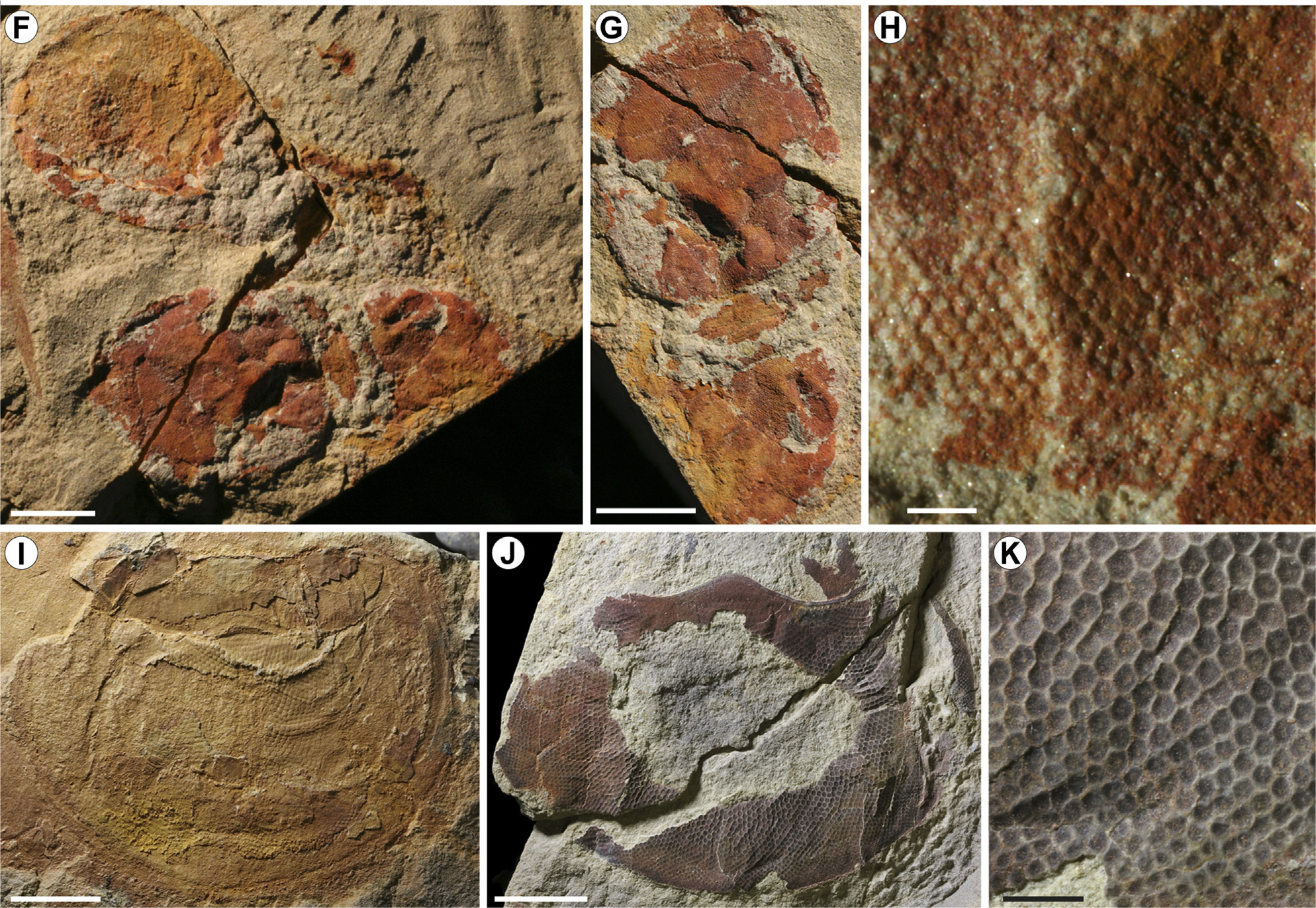
Preserved compound eyes of Anomalocaris (top, F-H) and Echidnacaris (bottom, I-K), showing preserved individual ommatidia lenses. The density of the lenses in Anomalocaris is comparable to that of living dragonflies. Scale bar = 5 mm in F, G, I, J 0.3 mm in H and 1 mm in K

Three head sclerite (carapace) complex formed by a central H-element (anterior sclerite or head shield) and a pair of P-elements (lateral sclerites) cover the dorsal and laterovental surface of the animal's head. The P-elements may connect to each other as well as the H-element by a narrow anterior extension (P-element neck or 'beak'). The head sclerites are small and ovoid in Anomalocarididae and Amplectobeluidae, but often enlarged in Hurdiidae, corresponded to their distinct body shapes (streamlined in Anomalocarididae/Amplectobeluidae but often compact in Hurdiidae). The head typically bore a pair of stalked compound eyes, which may have had mobility, and are located between the gaps formed by the posterior regions of the H-element and P-elements. In Anomalocaris, the stalked eyes had a over 24,000 lenses (ommatidia) in each eye, with the resolution being comparable to a dragonfly. The resolution of the eyes of Echidnacaris was somewhat lower though still considerable, with over 13,000 lenses per eye. The compound eyes of Echidnacaris, exceptionally among known radiodonts, are unstalked. Some species of Hurdiid possess an additional median eye located on the midline of the head behind the H-element.

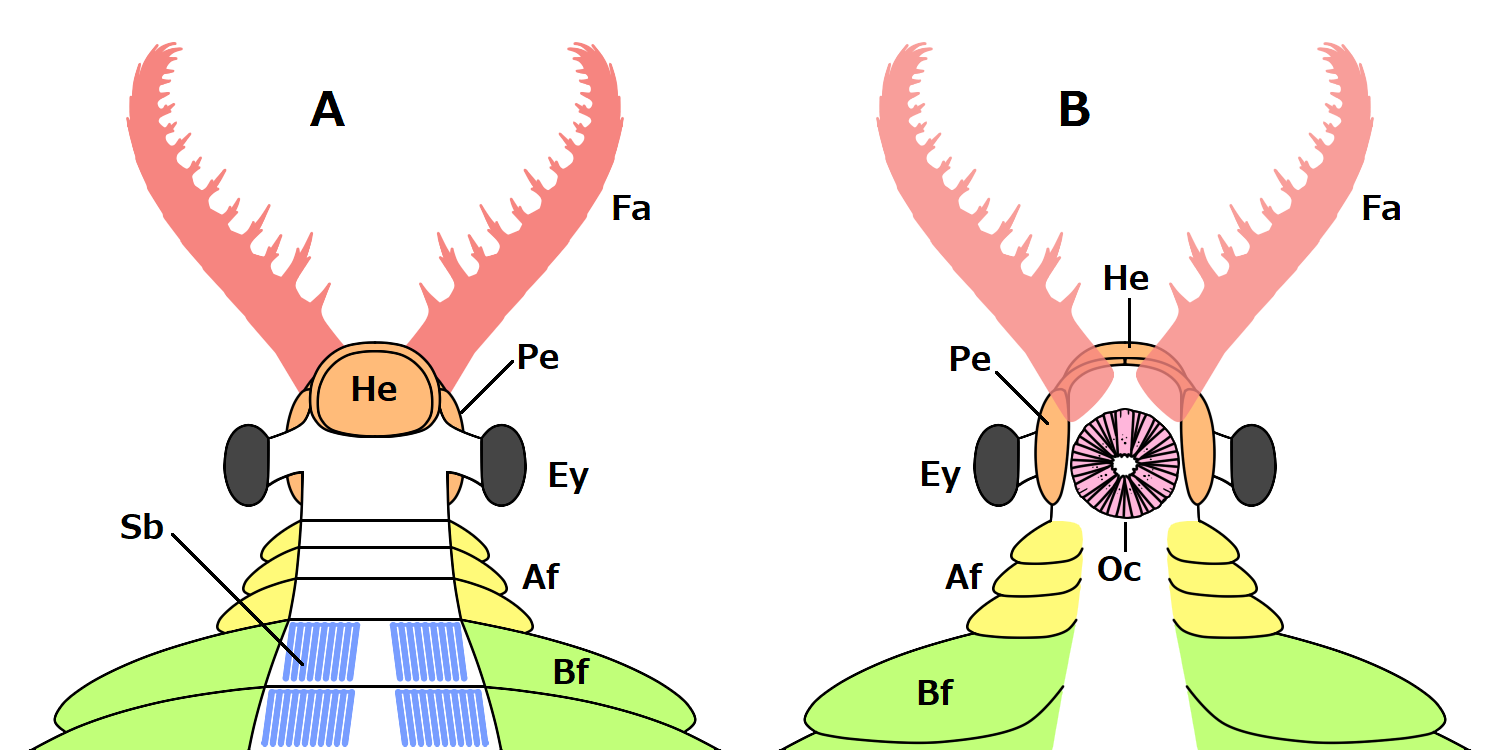
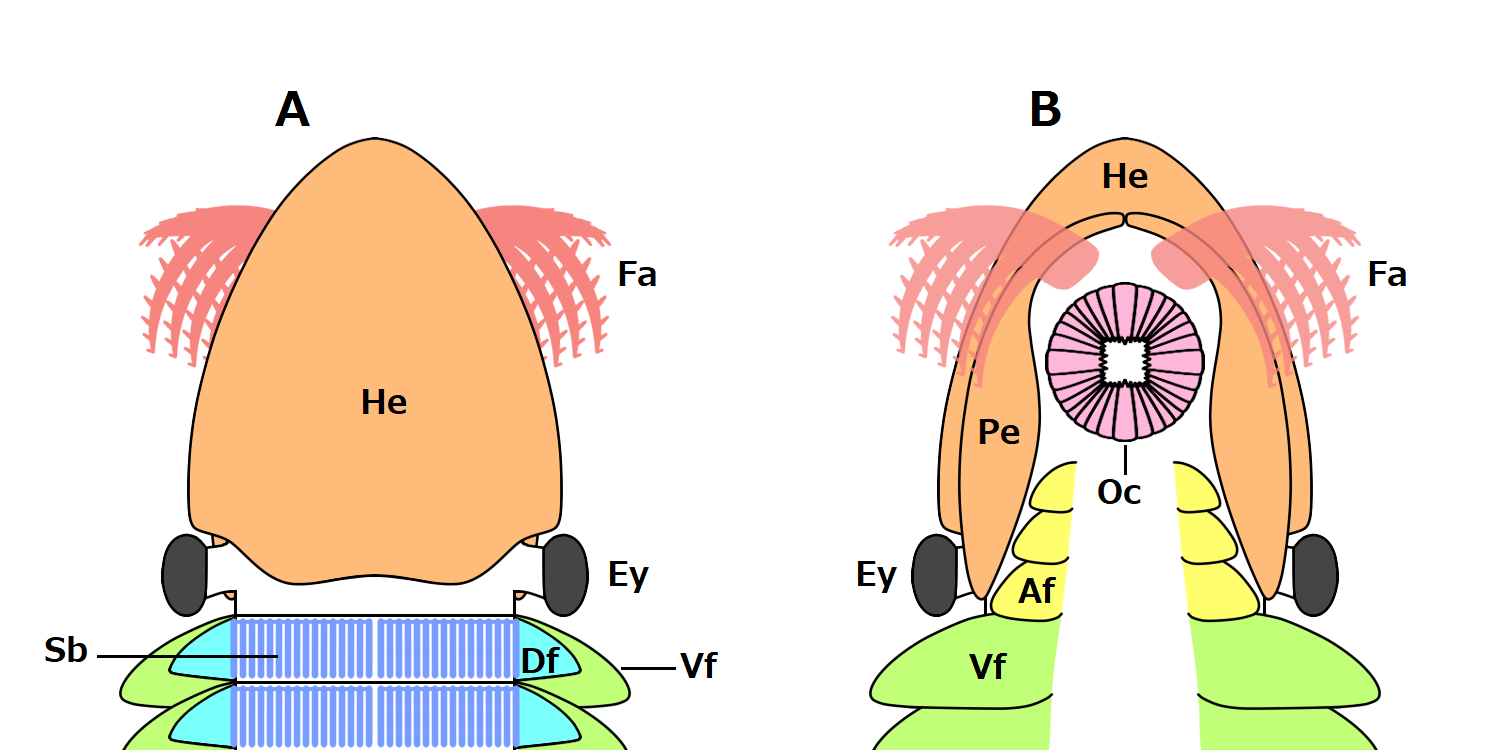
Anterior region of two generalized Anomalocaris and Hurdiid radiodont, showing distinct morphology A: Dorsal view, B: Ventral view, Fa: Frontal appendage, He: H-element, Pe: P-element, Ey: Eye, Oc: Oral cone, Af: Anterior (neck) flap, Bf/Vf:, Ventral flap, Sb: Setal blade

Contrary to the original diagnosis, the division of body segments (segmental boundaries) can be visible externally and no known member of Radiodonta (except the putative radiodont Cucumericrus) is known to have pediform trunk appendages (legs). The trunk has numerous body segments (somites), tapering from anterior to posterior, with the anterior three or four segments significantly constricted into a neck region.

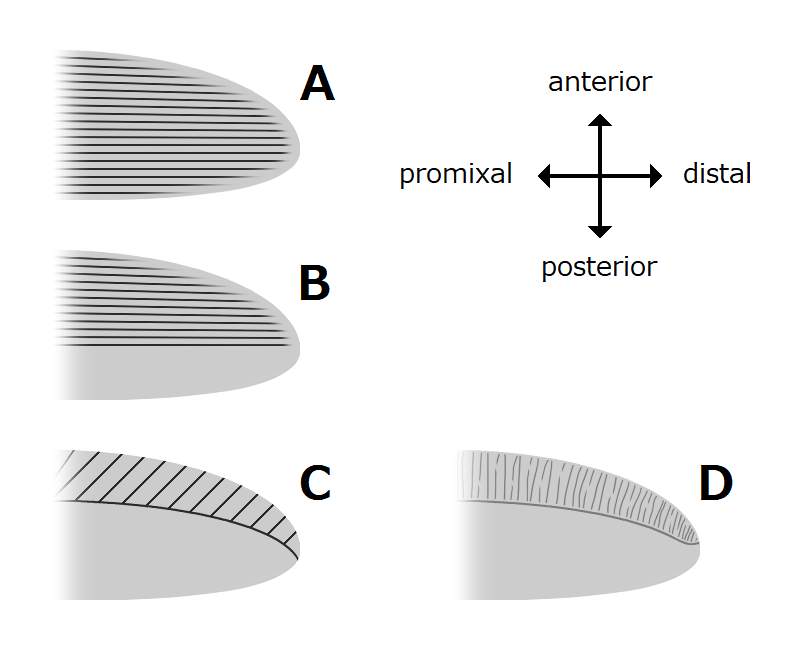
Variations of radiodont body flaps

The movement of radiodont flapping appendages

Video animation of Cambroraster falcatus, showcasing the movement of the trunk flaps

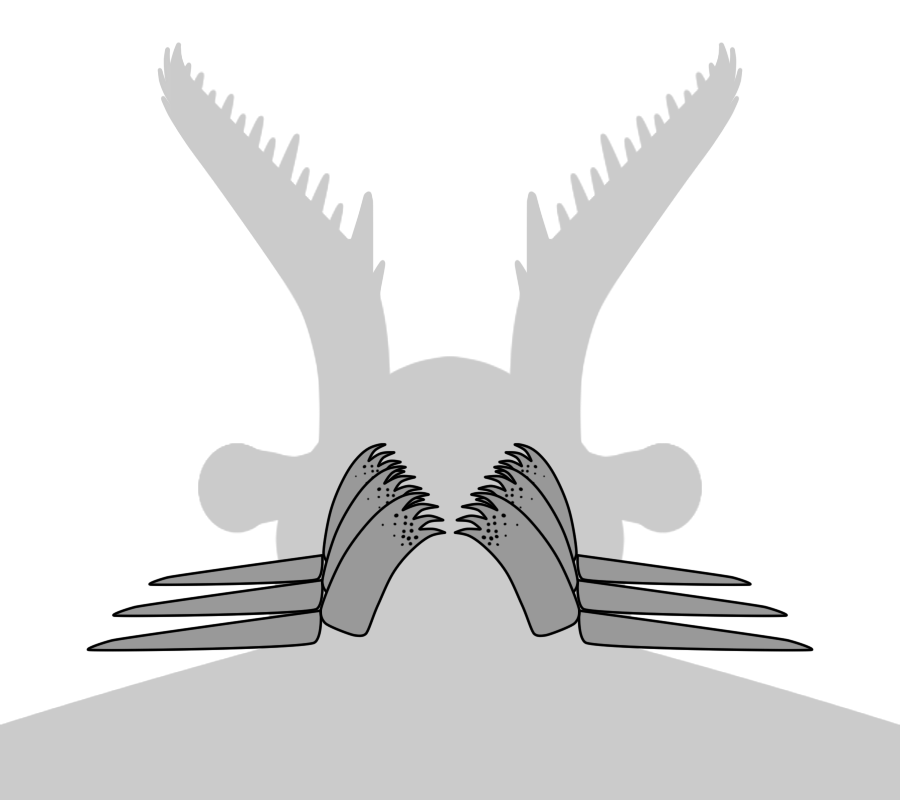
Ventral view of a generalized GLS-bearing radiodont, showing gnathobase‐like structures (GLSs) associated with reduced anterior flaps

The trunk appendages were fin-like body flaps ('lateral flaps' or 'lobes' in some studies), usually one pair of ventral flaps per body segment, each slightly overlapping the one more anterior to it, but additional, non-overlapping sets of small dorsal flaps may occur in some Hurdiid species. The flaps may have numerous vein-like structures (referred to as 'strengthening rays', 'flap rays', 'tranverse rods', 'transverse lines' or 'veins'). The flaps on the neck region (referred to as 'reduced flaps', 'neck flaps', 'head flaps', 'anterior flaps' or 'differentiated flaps') are significantly reduced. In some species, jaw-like feeding appendages called gnathobase-like structures (GLSs) arose from each of the bases of their reduced neck flaps. Numerous elongated blade-like extensions (referred to as lanceolate blades or lamellae) arranged in a row, forming bands of gill-like structures known as setal blades, covered the dorsal surface of each body segment. At least in Aegirocassis, each of the lanceolate blades are covered in wrinkles. The ventral flaps may be homologous to the endopod of the biramous limbs of euarthropods and lobopodous limbs (lobopods) of gilled lobopodians, and the dorsal flaps and setal blades may be homologous to the exite and gill-bearing dorsal flaps of the former taxa. The trunk may end either with a tail fan compose of 1 to 3 pairs of blades, a pair of long furcae, an elongated terminal structure, or a featureless blunt tip.

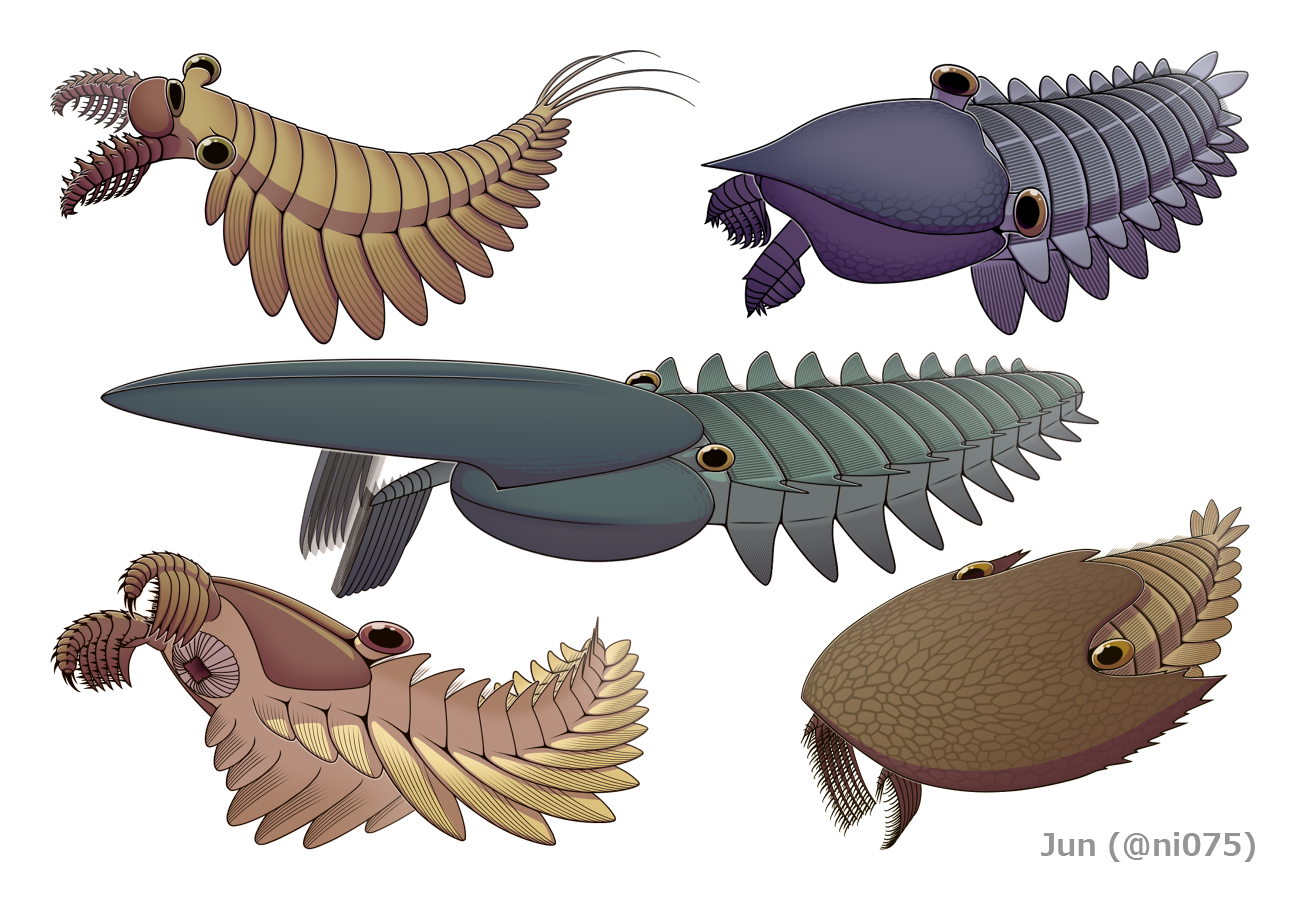
Stanleycaris, Hurdia, Aegirocassis, Peytoia and Cambroraster are all examples of hurdiid radiodonts. These were the most diverse and long lasting of the radiodont families, surviving from the Cambrian up until the Devonian.

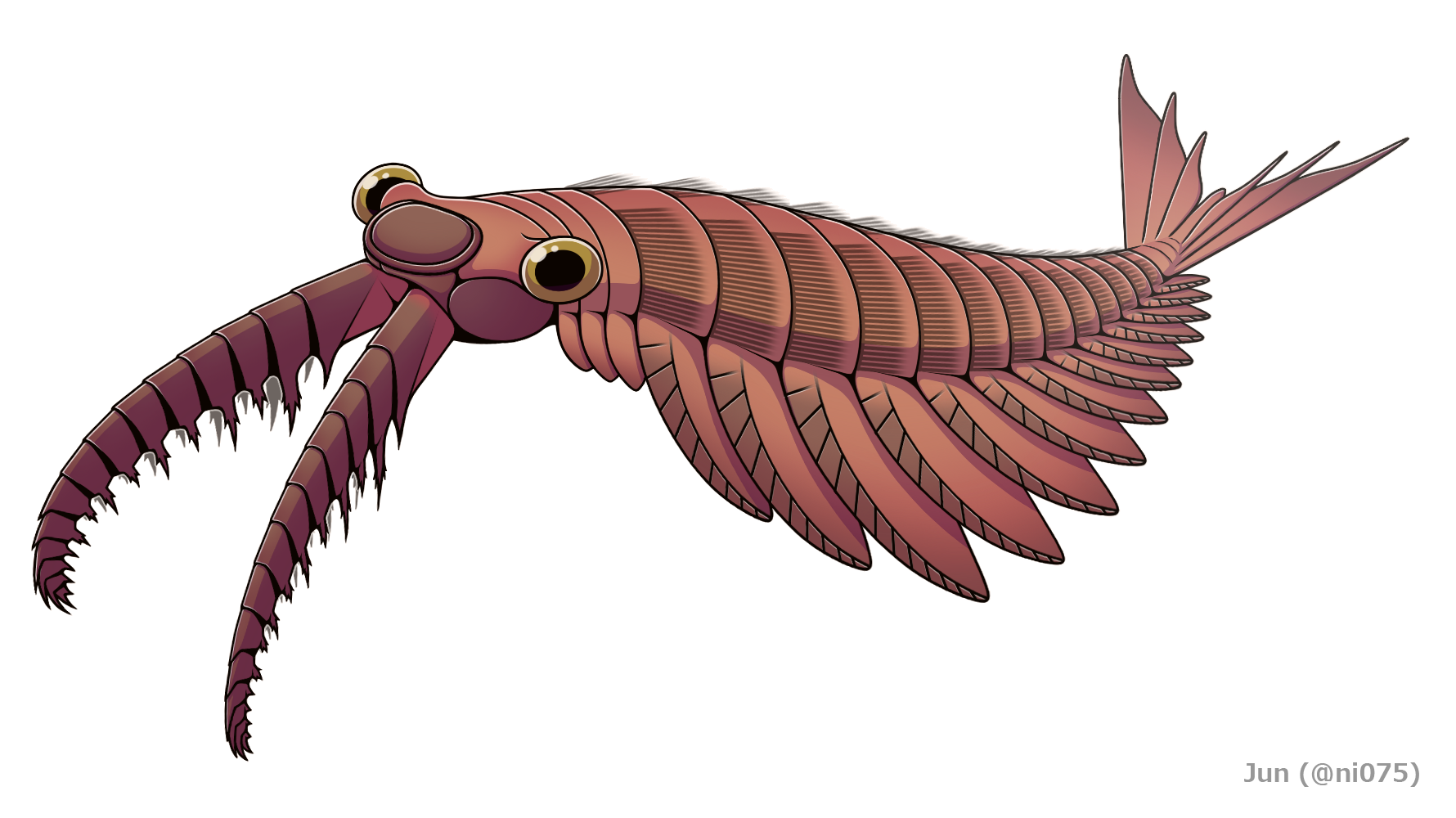
Anomalocaris is a member of the anomalocarididae family, which at one point included all radiodonts, but now only includes a few genera such as Lenisicaris.

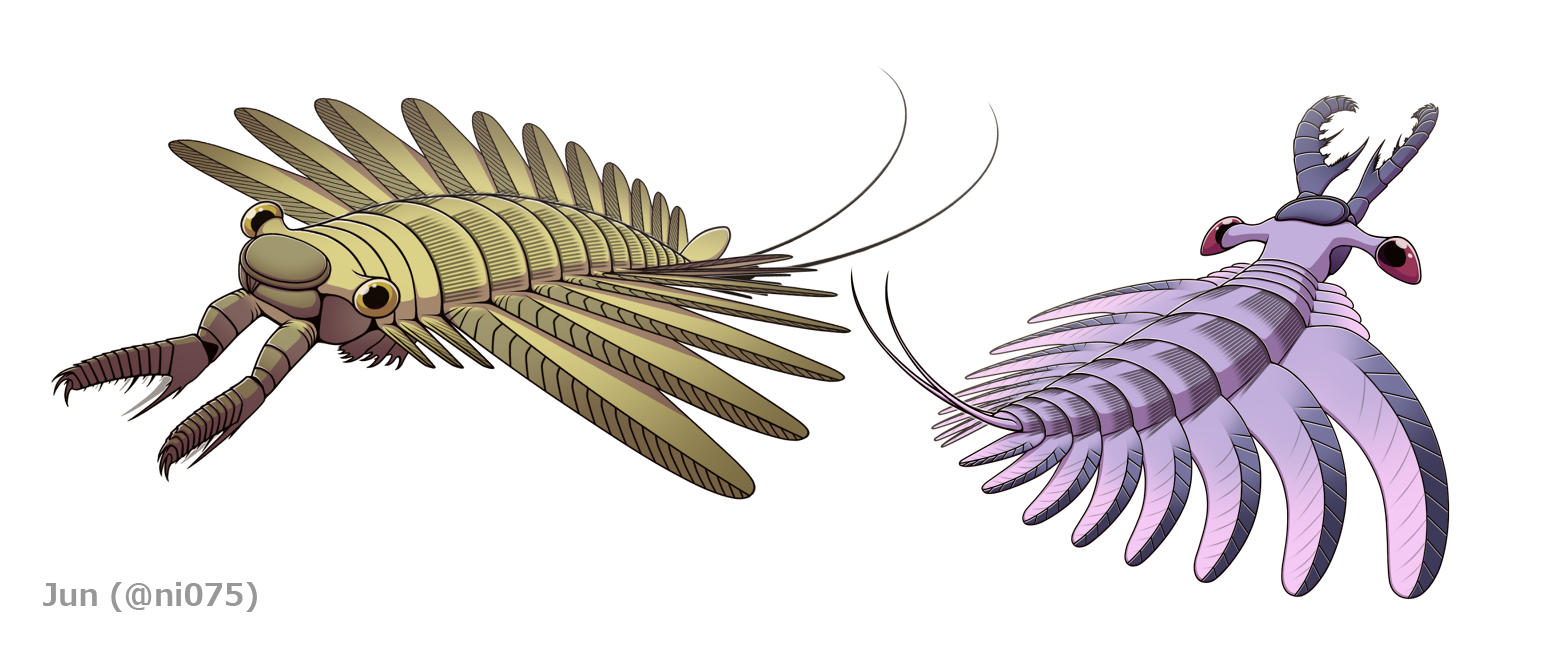
Amplectobelua and Lyrarapax are representatives of the amplectobeluidae which is a very inclusive family of mainly Chinese radiodonts.

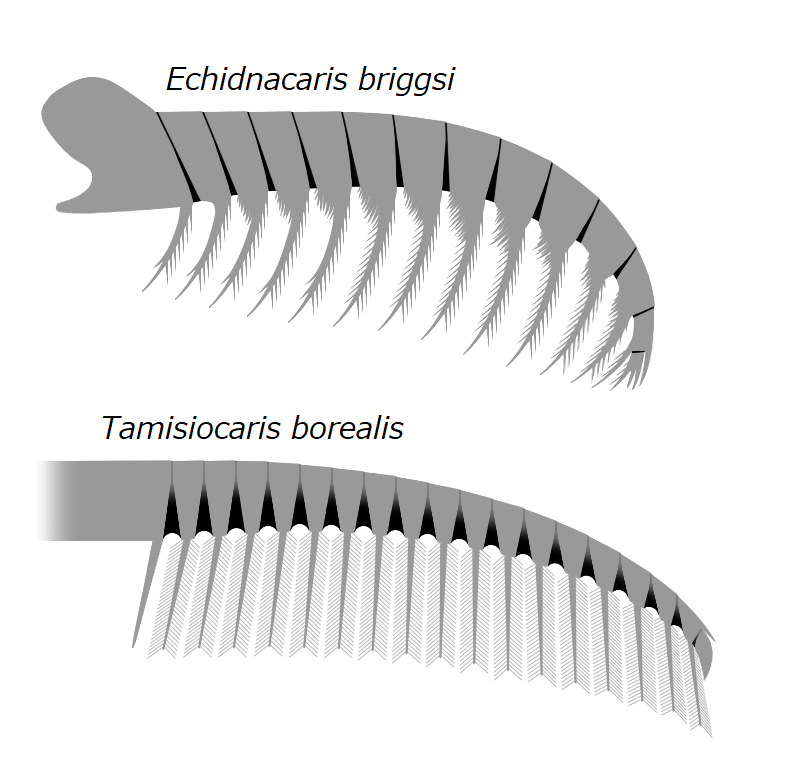
Echidnacaris and Tamisiocaris are examples of the family tamisiocarididae which were exclusively suspension feeding radiodonts from the Cambrian.

=== Internal structures ===
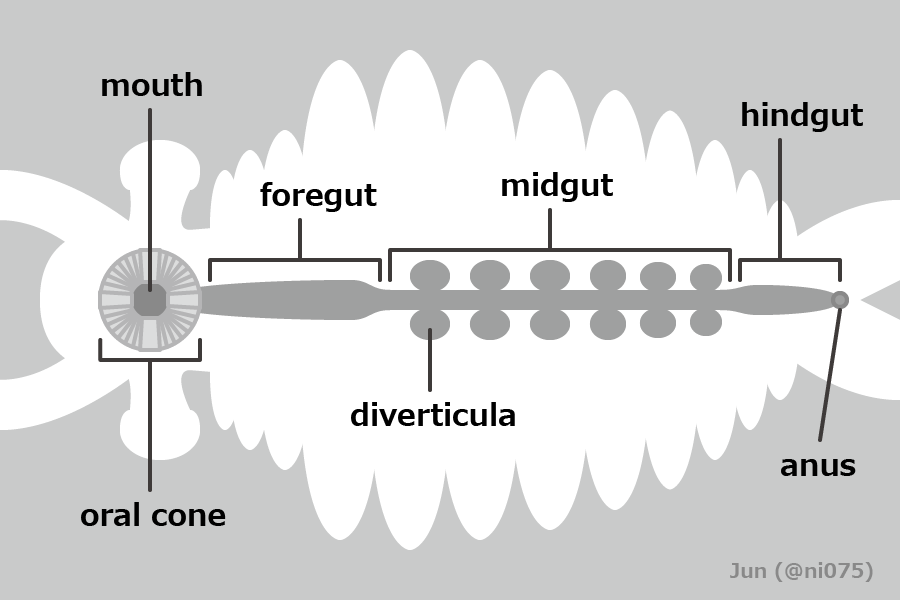
Digestive system of a radiodont.

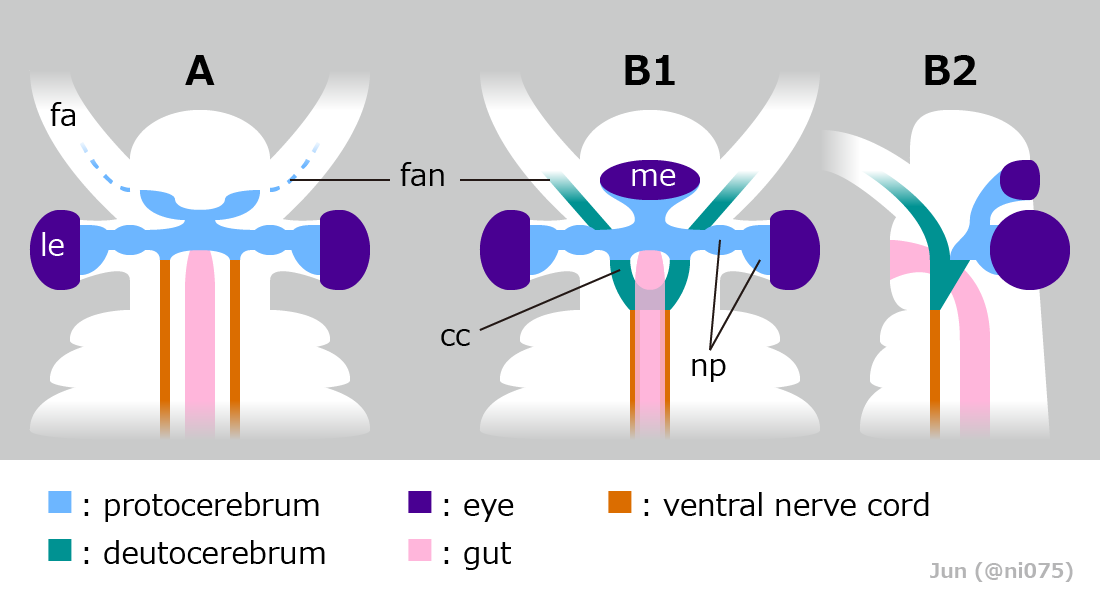
Various interpretations of radiodont brain. A: after Cong et al. 2014, B: after Moysiuk & Caron 2022

Traces of muscles, digestive system and nervous system were described from some radiodont fossils. Pairs of well-developed muscles were connected to the ventral flaps located at the lateral cavities of each body segment. Between the lateral muscles is a sophisticated digestive system, formed by a widening of the foregut and hindgut, both connected by a narrow midgut associated with six pairs of gut diverticula (digestive glands).

The brain of radiodonts was simpler than the three-segmented (compose of pro-, deuto- and tritocerebrum) brains of euarthropods, but further interpretations differ between studies. Based on Cong et al. 2014, the brain composed of only one brain segment originating from the ocular somite, the protocerebrum. The nerves of the frontal appendages and compound eyes arose from the anterior and lateral regions of the brain. Based on Moysiuk & Caron 2022, the frontal appendage nerves arose from the ventral deutocerebrum, the second brain segment. The previous "frontal appendage nerves" actually represent median eye nerve. In both interpretations, posterior to the brain was a pair of apparently unfused ventral nerve cords which ran through the animal's neck region.

== Paleoecology ==
=== Physiology ===
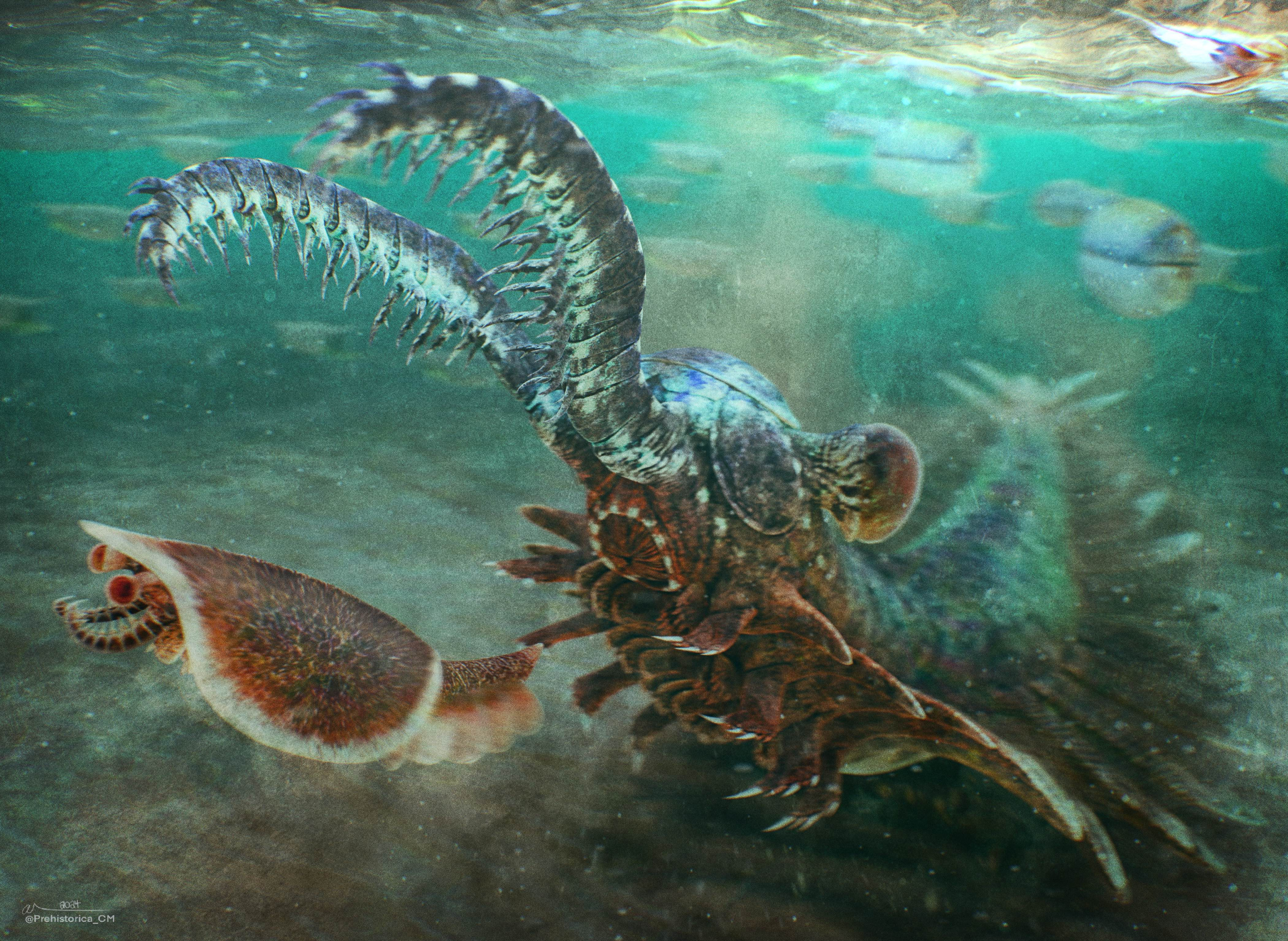
Reconstruction of Shucaris, an anomalocaridid or amplectobeluiid radiodont, using its frontal appendages to capture a fleeing Erratus

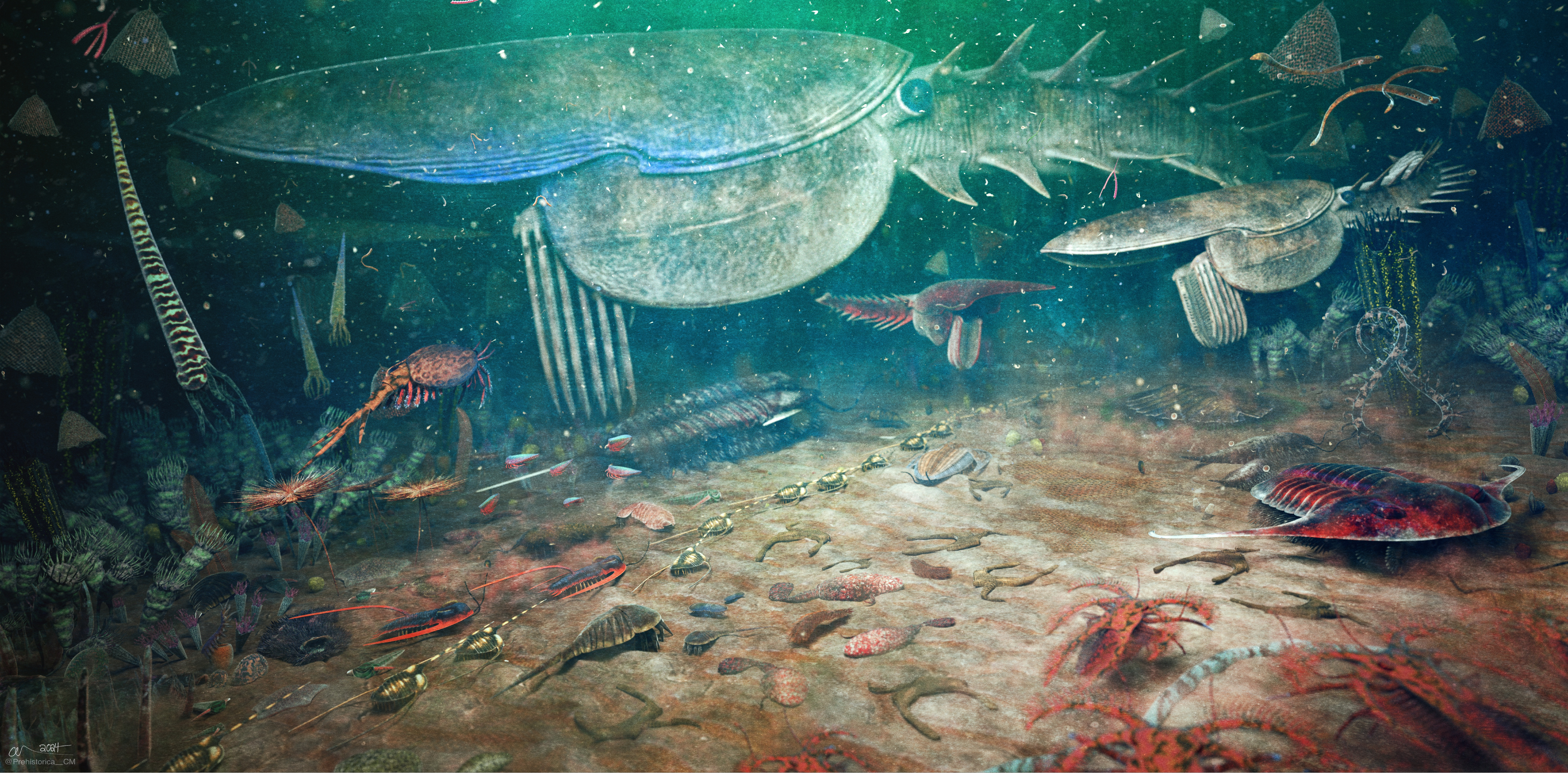
Reconstruction of the Fezouata Biota, featuring Aegirocassis, a filter feeding radiodont, and two species of Pseudoangustidontus

Radiodonts were interpreted as nektonic or nektobenthic animals, with their morphology suggesting an active swimming lifestyle. The muscular, overlapping ventral flaps may have propelled the animal through the water, possibly by moving in a wave-like formation resembling modern rays and cuttlefish. Pairs of dorsal flaps, which make up a tail fan in some species, may have helped steering and/or stabilizing the animal during locomotion. In Anomalocaris, morphology of the tail fan even suggests it could rapidly change its swimming direction efficiently. On the other hand, some hurdiids have features significantly specialized for a nektobenthic lifestyle, such as Cambroraster with its dome-like H-element similar to the carapace of a horseshoe crab. Bands of setal blades with wrinkling lanceolate blades may have increased the surface area, suggesting they were gills, providing the animal's respiratory function. Abundance of the remains of scleritzed structures such as disarticulated frontal appendages and head sclerite complexes, suggest that mass moulting events may have occurred among radiodonts, a behavior which also has been reported in some other Cambrian arthropods such as trilobites.

=== Diet ===
Anomalocaris canadensis

Amplectobelua stephenensis

Hurdia victoria

Tamisiocaris borealis

Peytoia nathorsti

Cambroraster falcatus

Suggested frontal appendage mobility and movement of various radiodonts

Radiodonts had diverse feeding strategies, which could be categorized as raptorial predators, sediment sifters, or suspension, filter feeders. For example, raptorial predators like Anomalocaris and Amplectobeluids might have been able to catch agile prey by using their raptorial frontal appendages; the latter even bore a robust endite for holding prey like a pincer. With the smaller head carapace complex and large surface of arthrodial membranes, frontal appendages of these taxa had greater flexibility. Stout frontal appendages of sediment sifters like Hurdia and Peytoia have serrated endites with mesial curvature, which could form a basket-like trap for raking through sediment and passing food items towards the well-developed oral cone. Endites of frontal appendages from suspension/filter feeders like Tamisiocaris and Aegirocassis have flexible, densely packed auxiliary spines, which could filter out organic components such as mesozooplankton and phytoplankton down to 0.5mm. Frontal appendages of Caryosyntrips, which are unusual for radiodonts in having the direction of endite-bearing surfaces opposing one another and may have been able to manipulate and crush prey in a scissor-like slicing or grasping motion.

Oral cones of radiodonts may have been used for suction and/or biting. Together with the great variety of frontal appendages in different species of radiodonts, differentiation of oral cones between species suggests preferences of different diets as well. For example, the triradial oral cone of Anomalocaris with irregular, tuberculated toothplates and a small opening may have been adapted to small and nektonic prey, while the rigid tetraradial oral cones of Peytoia, Titanokorys, Hurdia, and one isolated oral cone attributed to Cambroraster with a larger opening and sometimes additional tooth plates may have been capable to consume larger food items relative to their body size and probably benthic or endobenthic prey.

== Classification ==
=== Taxonomic affinities ===
- Ecdysozoa
  - Cycloneuralia
    Priapulida and relatives
  - Panarthropoda
    - Onychophora
    - Tardigrada
    - †
      Lobopodian grade
      (paraphyletic)
    - - †
        Siberiid lobopodians
      - - †
          Pambdelurion
        - †
          Kerygmachela
        - - †
            Opabiniidae
          - †
            Radiodonta
          - Deuteropoda

Summarized phylogeny between Radiodonta and other Ecdysozoan taxa

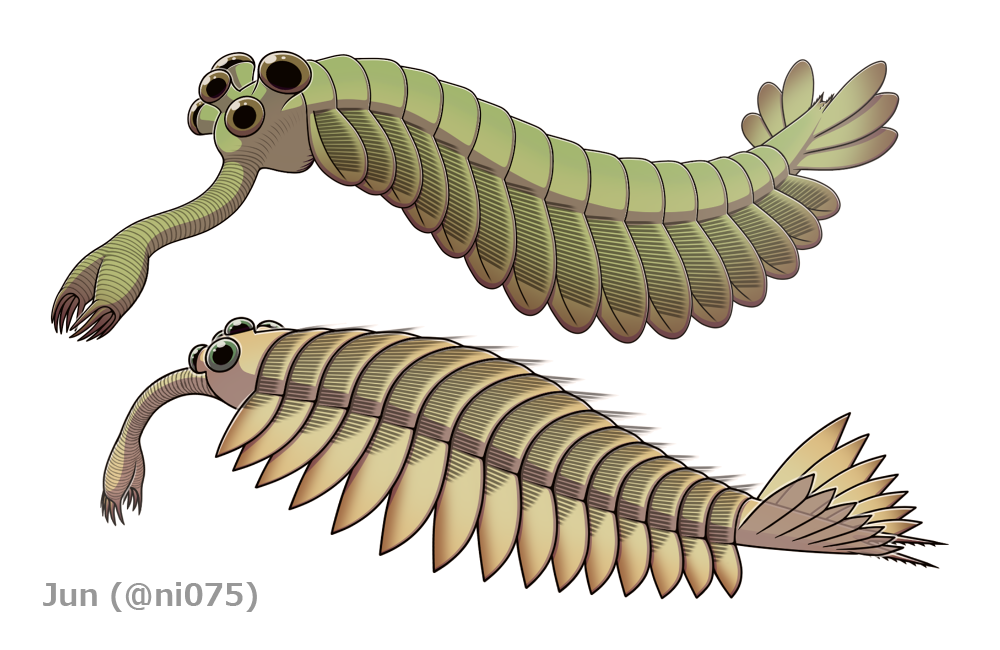
The opabiniids Opabinia (top) and Utaurora (bottom), were close relatives of the radiodonts

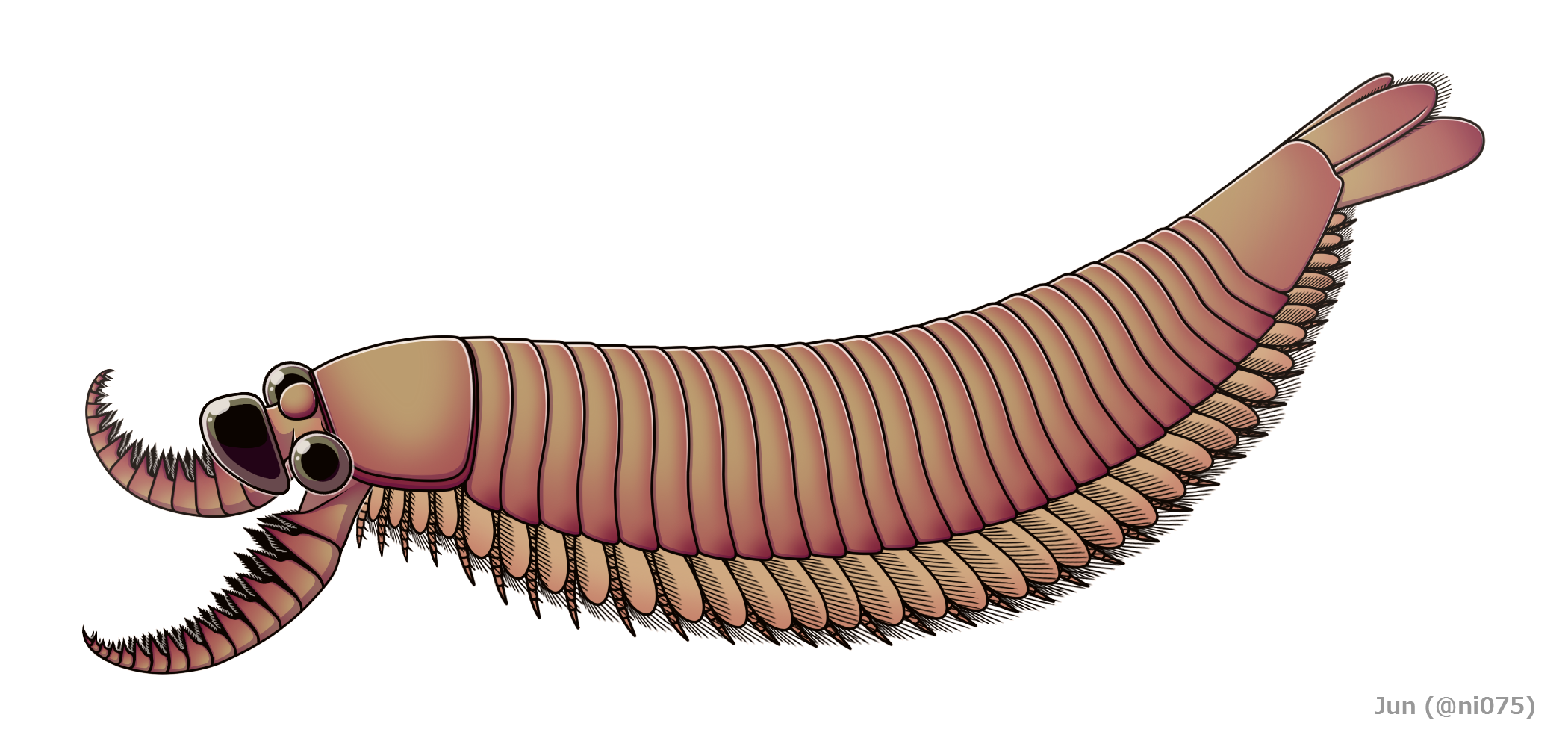
The presumed radiodont/opabiniid-euarthropod intermediate Kylinxia, shares many of the characteristics found in both dinocaridids and euarthropods — later studies have considered this relationship far less direct

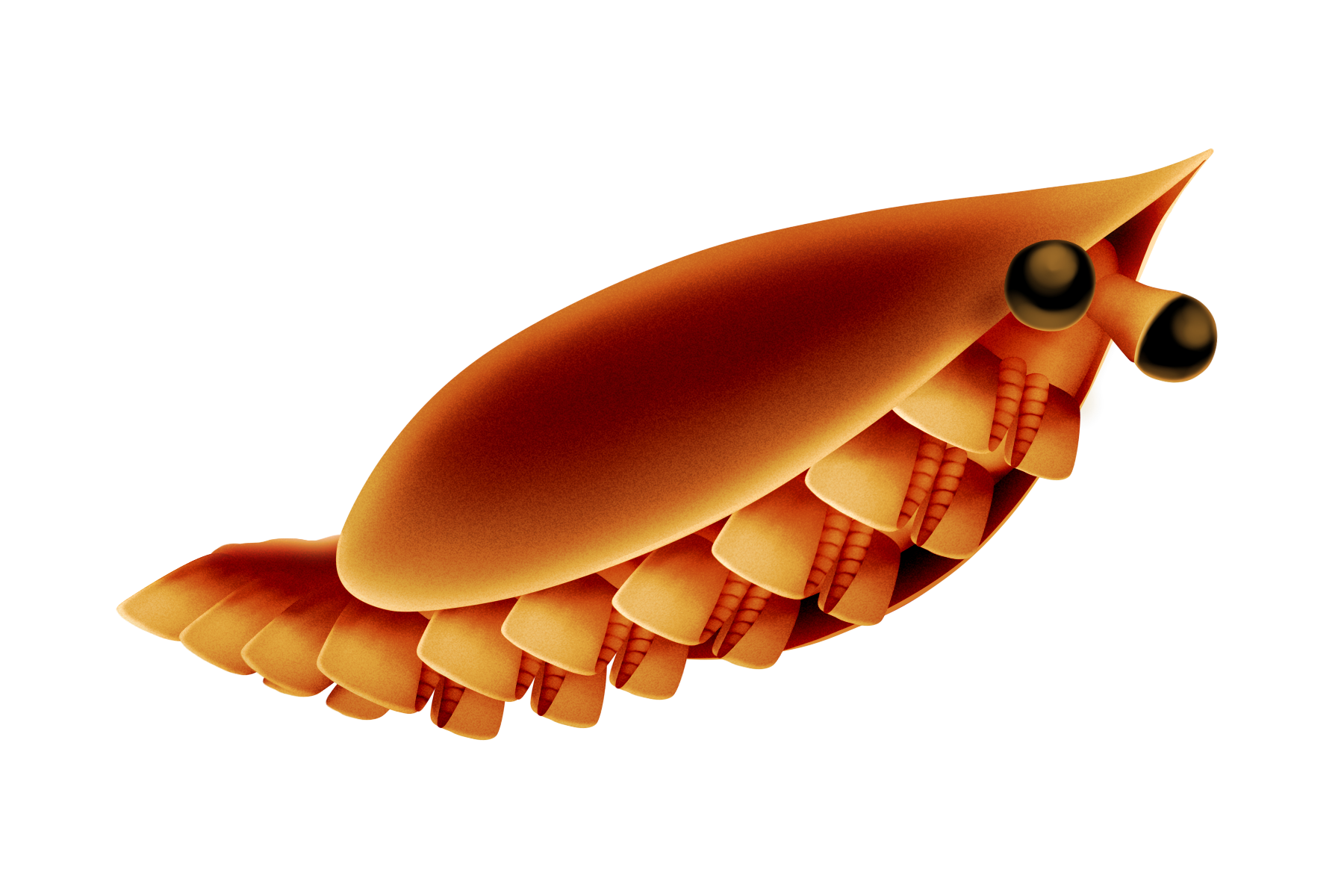
A life reconstruction of the basal deuteropod Erratus, which helped reveal the evolution of arthropod trunk appendages

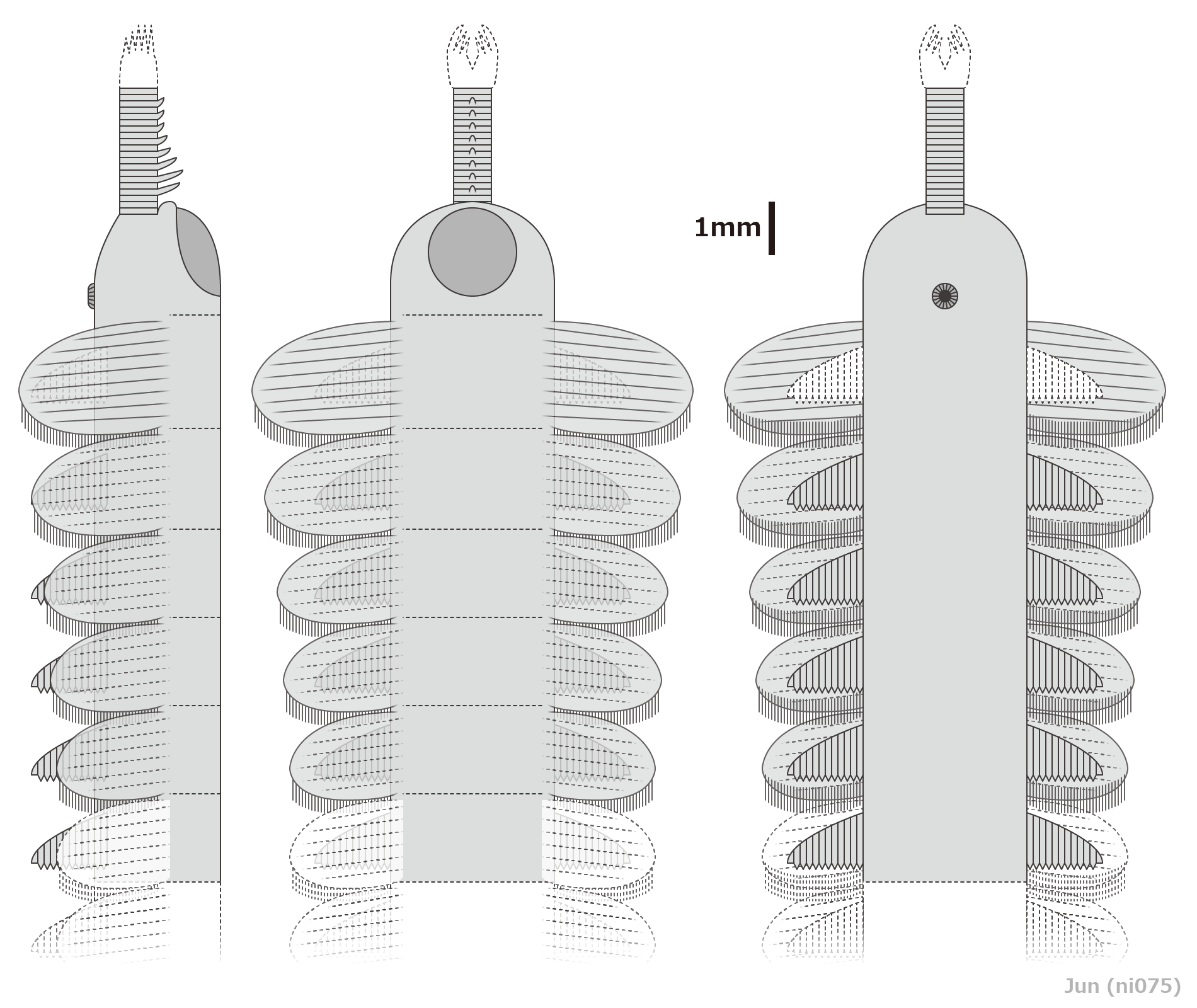
Mieridduryn is a dinocaridid panarthropod from the Middle Ordovician that shares traits with both opabiniids and radiodonts

Most phylogenetic analyses suggest that radiodonts, alongside opabiniids (Opabinia and Utaurora), are stem-group arthropods just basal to deuteropoda, a clade including upper stem (e.g. fuxianhuiids and bivalved arthropods) and crown Euarthropoda (e.g. Artiopoda, Chelicerata and Mandibulata). This interpretation is supported by numerous arthropod groundplan found on radiodonts and opabiniids, such as stalked compound eyes, digestive glands, trunk appendages forming by dorsal and ventral elements (precursor of arthropod biramous appendages). Compared to opabiniids, which possess posterior mouth opening and fused frontalmost appendages (comparable to euarthropod posterior-facing labrum/hypostome complex), radiodonts on the other hand featured euarthropod-like dorsal sclerite (H-element) and arthropodization (frontal appendages) on their head regions, alongside cuticularized gut termini. The fact that both radiodonts and opabiniids lack exoskeleton on their trunk region suggests that the origin of compound eyes and arthropodization (segmented appendages) precede arthrodization (full set of trunk exoskeleton) in the arthropod stem lineage. The constricted neck region with feeding appendicular structures of some radiodont may also shed light on the origin of the sophisticated arthropod head, which was formed by the fusion of multiple anterior body segments. Basal deuteropods that possess a mixture of radiodont/opabiniid characters like Kylinxia and Erratus, may represent intermediate forms between radiodonts, opabiniids and other euarthropods.

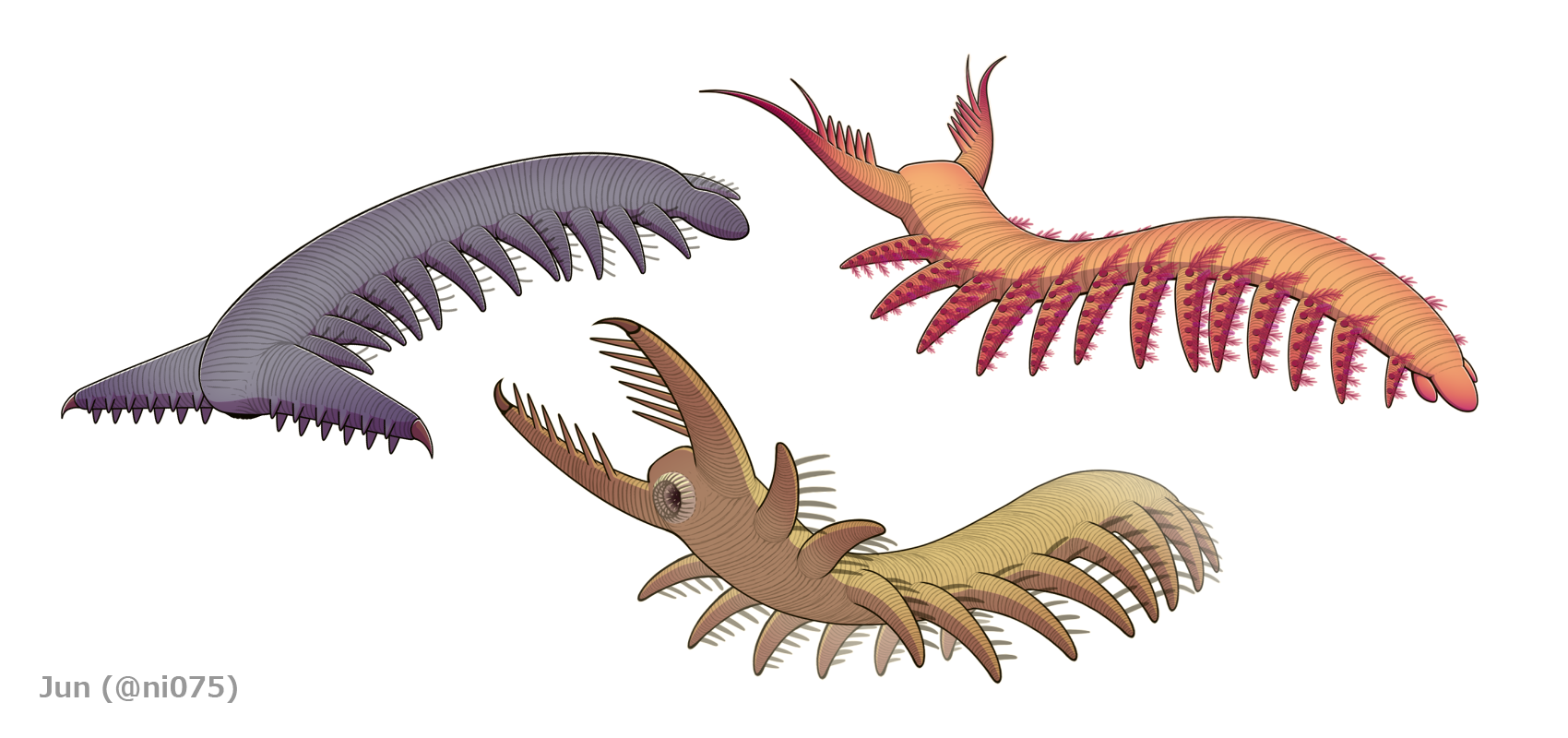
The siberiid lobopodians Siberion (upper left), Megadictyon (bottom center) and Jianshanopodia (upper right)

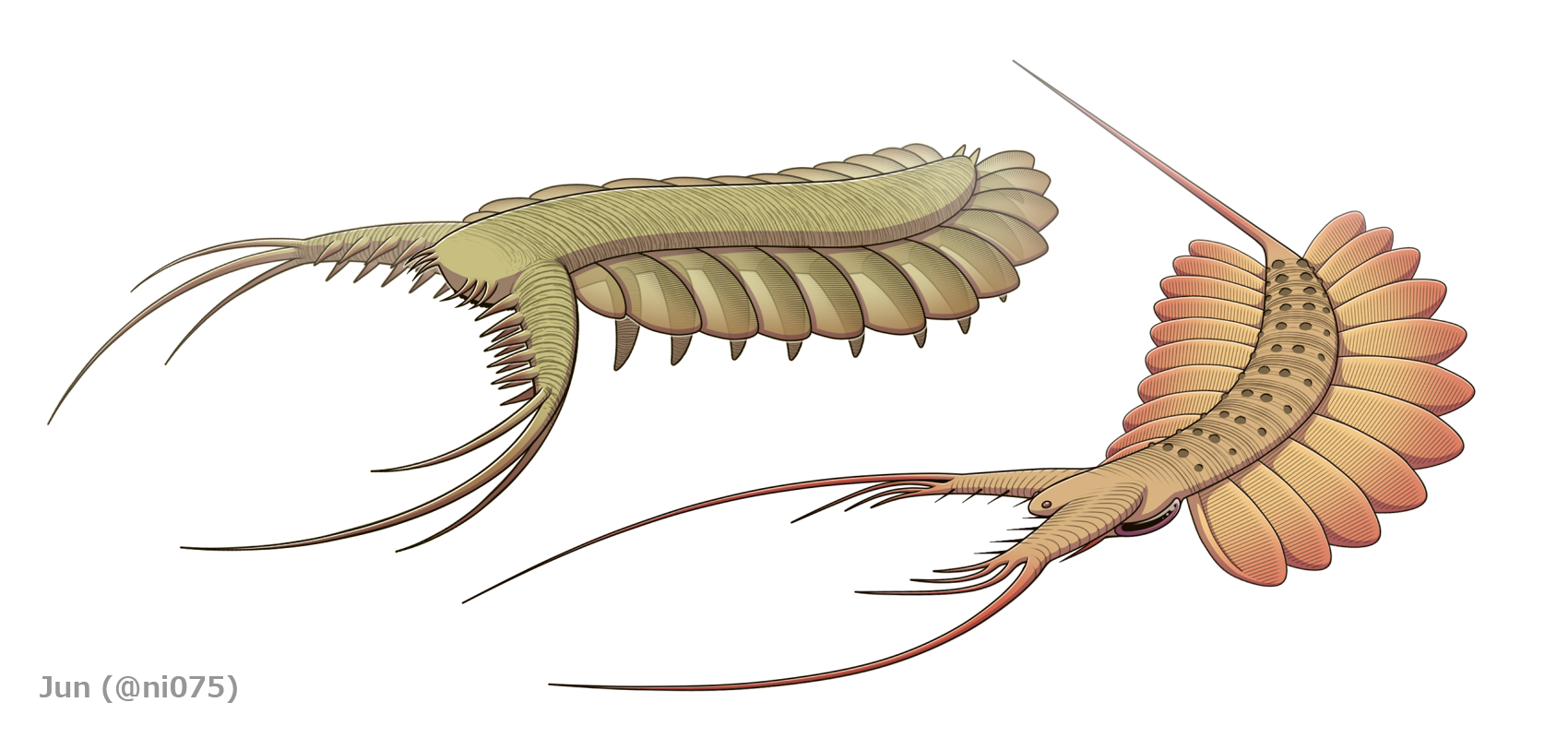
The 'gilled lobopodians' Pambdelurion (left) and Kerygmachela (right)

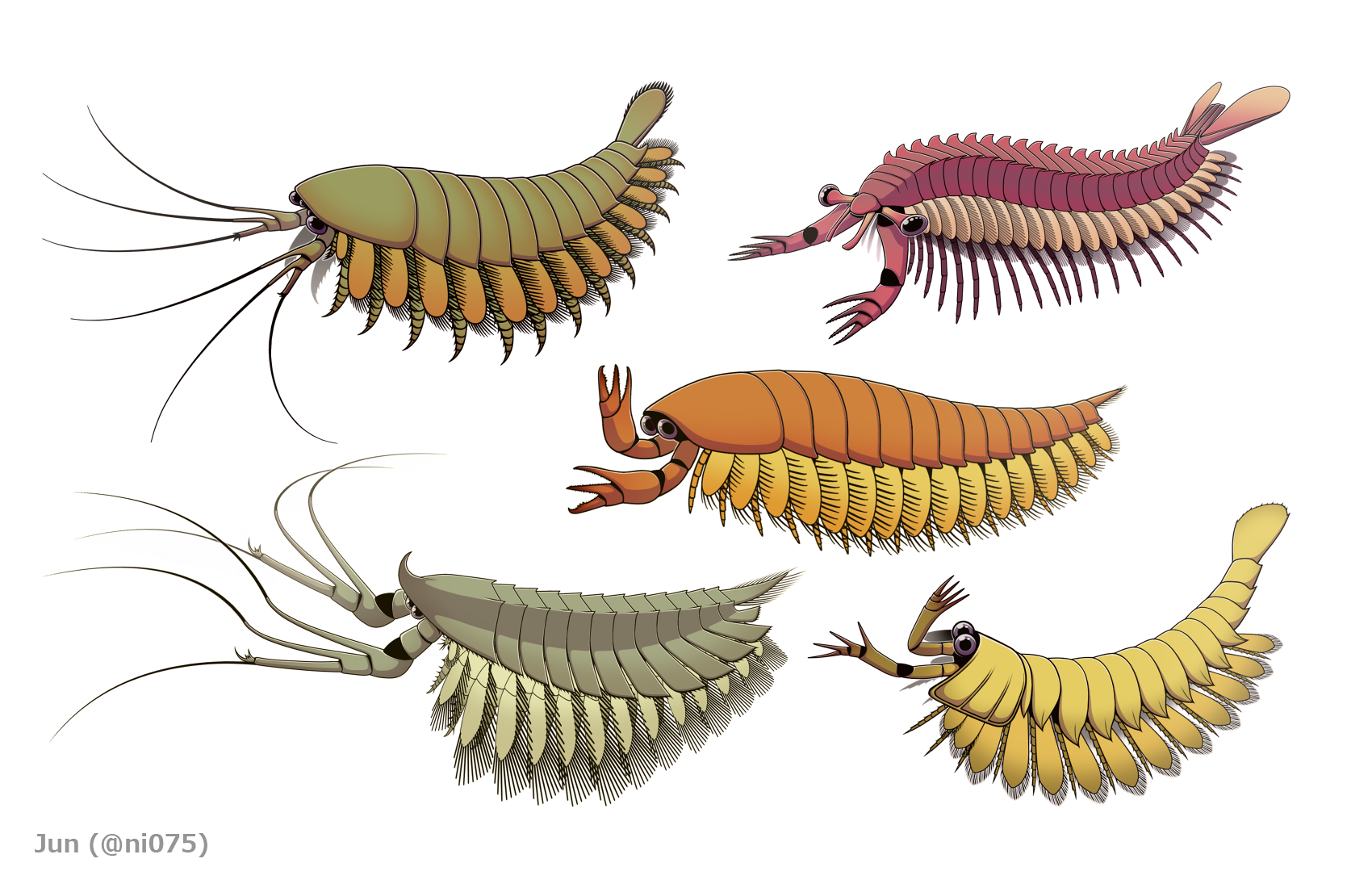
Megacheira or 'great appendage arthropods', a class of possible stem-chelicerate previously thought to be radiodont's close relative

Taxa just basal to the radiodont, opabiniid and euarthropod branch are 'gilled lobopodians' like Pambdelurion and Kerygmachela, which are occasionally united under the class Dinocaridida with opabibiids and radiodonts. They have body flaps, digestive glands, large (presumely compound) eyes and specialized frontal appendages like the former taxa, but their frontal appendages are not arthropodized nor fused, eyes sessile, gill-like structures less prominent, and certainly bore lobopod underneath each of their flaps. Taxa even basal to 'gilled lobopodians' are siberiids like Megadictyon and Jianshanopodia, a group of lobopodians that bore robust frontal appendages and digestive glands, but no body flaps. Such intermediate forms between lobopodian and radiodont/euarthropod suggest that the total-group Arthropoda arose from a paraphyletic lobopodian grade, alongside the other two extant panarthropod phyla Tardigrada and Onychophora.

Previous studies may suggest radiodonts as a group other than stem-arthropods, such as a hitherto unknown phylum; cycloneuralian worms undergone convergent with arthropods (based on the cycloneuralian-like radial mouthparts); stem chelicerate euarthropods alongside megacheirans also known as great appendage arthropods (based on the similarity between radiodont frontal appendages, megacheiran great appendages and chelicerae); or Schinderhannes bartelsi, which resolved as a hurdiid radiodont in recent analyses, as a species more closely related to euarthropods than other radiodonts (based on some putative euarthropod-like features found on Schinderhannes). However, neither each of them were supported by later investigations. The radial mouthparts are not cycloneuralian-exclusive and more likely present result of convergent evolution or ecdysozoan plesimorphy, since they also have been found in panarthropods such as tardigrade and some lobopodians; radiodonts lacking definitive euarthropod features such as trunk tergites and multiple head appendages, and the megacheiran great appendages were considered to be deutocerebral, which could be non-homologous to the radiodont protocerebral frontal appendages; putative euarthropod characters found on the single Schinderhannes fossil is questionable and may present other radiodont-like structures.

=== Interrelationships ===
- - - Tamisiocarididae
      - Houcaris saron
      - - Echidnacaris briggsi
        - Tamisiocaris
    - Anomalocarididae+ Amplectobeluidae
      - Laminacaris
      - Houcaris magnabasis
      - Anomalocaris
      - - Lyrarapax
        - Amplectobelua
      - - "Anomalocaris" kunmingensis
        - Ramskoeldia consimilis
        - Ramskoeldia platyacantha
        - Paranomalocaris
    - Hurdiidae
      - Peytoia
      - cf. Peytoia
      - Stanleycaris
      - Schinderhannes
      - - Aegirocassis
        - - Hurdia
          - - Pahvantia
            - - Cambroraster
              - - Titanokorys
                - Cordaticaris
  - Euarthropoda
  - Caryosyntrips

Phylogeny of Radiodonta after Moysiuk & Caron 2021

Traditionally, all radiodont species have been placed within one family, Anomalocarididae, hence the previous common name 'anomalocaridid' and it was still occasionally used to refer the whole order even after reclassification. Since the reassignment done by Vinther et al. 2014, most of the radiodont species were reclassified within three new families: Amplectobeluidae, Tamisiocarididae (formerly Cetiocaridae), and Hurdiidae. Including Anomalocarididae, the four recent radiodont families may form the clade Anomalocarida.

The original description of the order Radiodonta included Anomalocaris, Laggania (later known as Peytoia), Hurdia, Proboscicaris, Amplectobelua, Cucumericrus, and Parapeytoia. However, Proboscicaris is now regarded as a junior synonym of Hurdia, and Parapeytoia is considered to be a Megacheiran. Due to the limited discovery, The position of Cucumericrus within Radiodonta is unclear, as it was either unselected by phylogenetic analysis or resolved in a polytomy with Radiodonta and Euarthropoda.

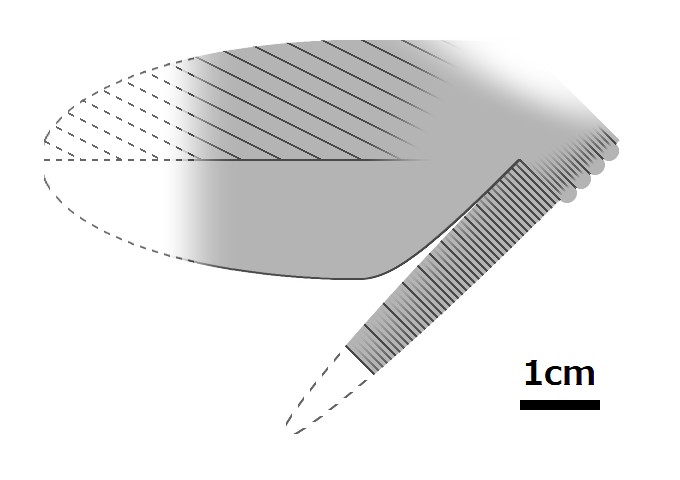
One of the poorly-known body parts (trunk appendage) of Cucumericrus decoratus; this species may not represent a true radiodont.

Frontal appendage of Echidnacaris briggsi, a tamisiocarid radiodont that was once suggested to belong to the Anomalocaris genus until its description in 2023.

The first in-depth phylogenetic analysis of Radiodonta was conducted by Vinther et al. in 2014, followed by a handful of subsequest studies with more or less modified results. In most analysis, Caryosyntrips is the basal-most genus, but either resolved in a polytomy with other radiodonts and Euarthropoda (alongside Cucumericrus if included) or outside of Radiodonta, casting doubt on its radiodont affinity. With the exclusion of questionable Caryosyntrips and Cucumericrus, the monophyly of Radiodonta is widely supported, with a few results suggest possible paraphyly (either the Anomalocarididae+Amplectobeluidae clade or Hurdiidae sister to Euarthropoda). Putative synapomorphies of monophyletic Radiodonta include tripartite head sclerite complex and differentiated neck region. The genus Anomalocaris in a broader sense always found to be polyphyletic, usually with "Anomalocaris" kunmingensis and "Anomalocaris" briggsi resolved as a member of Amplectobeluidae and Tamisiocarididae respectively. Interrelationship of Amplectobeluidae is uncertain, as the amplectobeluid affinities of Lyrarapax and Ramskoeldia were occasionally questioned. Monophyly of the speciose family Hurdiidae was recovered by most analysis and well-supported by several synapomorphies (e.g. distal articulated region of frontal appendage with proximal 5 podomeres bearing subequal endites). Tamisiocarididae was often suggested to be sister group of Hurdiidae in the 2010s, but this position became questionable in subsequent studies.

- Radiodonta
  - ?Cucumericrus (radiodont affinity questionable)
  - ?Caryosyntrips (radiodont affinity questionable)
  - Anomalocarida
    - Paranomalocaris (placed within Anomalocarididae by some studies.)
    - Laminacaris (placed within Amplectobeluidae by some studies.)
    - Houcaris (either placed within Anomalocarididae, Amplectobeluidae or Tamisiocarididae.)
    - Innovatiocaris
    - Anomalocarididae
      - Anomalocaris (in a broader sense, some species may placed within the other families.)
      - Lenisicaris
      - Shucaris (either placed within Anomalocarididae or Amplectobeluidae)
      - Verrocaris
    - Amplectobeluidae
      - Lyrarapax (position questioned by some studies.)
      - Amplectobelua
      - Ramskoeldia (position questioned by some studies.)
      - Guanshancaris
      - Shucaris (either placed within Anomalocarididae or Amplectobeluidae)
    - Tamisiocarididae
      - Tamisiocaris
      - Echidnacaris
      - Houcaris
    - Hurdiidae/Peytoiidae
      - Aegirocassisinae
        - Aegirocassis
        - Pseudoangustidontus
      - Peytoia
      - Schinderhannes (position questioned by some studies.)
      - Stanleycaris
      - Mosura
      - Falciscaris
      - Hurdiinae
        - Hurdia
        - Pahvantia
        - Ursulinacaris
        - Cambroraster
        - ?Zhenghecaris (putative hurdiid radiodont)
        - Cordaticaris
        - Buccaspinea
        - Titanokorys
        - Huangshandongia (may be a synonym of Hurdia)
        - Liantuoia (may be a synonym of Hurdia)
        - Acanthopahvantia

Described species of Radiodonta
| Species | Original description | Year named | Family | Age | Location | Frontal appendage | Head sclerite complex |
|---|---|---|---|---|---|---|---|
| Cucumericrus decoratus | Hou, Bergström, & Ahlberg | 1995 | (unassigned) | Cambrian Stage 3 | China | Unknown | Unknown |
| Caryosyntrips serratus | Daley & Budd | 2010 | (unassigned) | Wuliuan–Drumian | Canada United States | | Unknown |
| Caryosyntrips camurus | Pates & Daley | 2017 | (unassigned) | Wuliuan | Canada United States | | Incomplete |
| Caryosyntrips durus | Pates & Daley | 2017 | (unassigned) | Drumian | United States | | Unknown |
| Paranomalocaris multisegmentalis | Wang, Huang, & Hu | 2013 | Anomalocarididae? | Cambrian Stage 4 | China | | Unknown |
| Paranomalocaris simplex | Jiao, Pates, Lerosey-Aubril, Ortega-Hernandez, Yang, Lan, Zhang | 2021 | Anomalocarididae? | Cambrian Stage 4 | China | | Unknown |
| Laminacaris chimera | Guo, Pates, Cong, Daley, Edgecombe, Chen, & Hou | 2018 | (controversial) | Cambrian Stage 3 | China | | Unknown |
| Innovatiocaris maotianshanensis | Zeng, Zhao, Zhu | 2022 | (unassigned) | Cambrian Stage 3 | China | | P-element unknown |
| Innovatiocaris? multispiniformis | Zeng, Zhao, Zhu | 2022 | (unassigned) | Cambrian Stage 3 | China | | Unknown |
| Anomalocaris canadensis | Whiteaves | 1892 | Anomalocarididae | Wuliuan | Canada | | |
| Lenisicaris pennsylvanica (formerly Anomalocaris pennsylvanica) | Resser | 1929 | Anomalocarididae | Cambrian Stage 3 | United States | | Unknown |
| Lenisicaris lupata | Wu, Ma, Lin, Sun, Zhang, & Fu | 2021 | Anomalocarididae | Cambrian Stage 3 | China | | Unknown |
| Anomalocaris daleyae | Paterson, García-Bellidob & Edgecombe | 2023 | Anomalocarididae | Cambrian Stage 4 | Australia | | Unknown |
| Houcaris magnabasis (formerly Anomalocaris magnabasis) | Pates, Daley, Edgecombe, Cong & Lieberman | 2019 | (controversial) | Cambrian Stage 4 | United States | | Unknown |
| Houcaris saron (formerly Anomalocaris saron) | Hou, Bergström, & Ahlberg | 1995 | (controversial) | Cambrian Stage 3 | China | | Unknown |
| Echidnacaris briggsi | Nedin | 1995 | Tamisiocarididae | Cambrian Stage 4 | Australia | | Possible H-element and unique lateral sclerites associated with compound eyes |
| Ramskoeldia platyacantha | Cong, Edgecombe, Daley, Guo, Pates, & Hou | 2018 | Amplectobeluidae | Cambrian Stage 3 | China | | Incomplete |
| Houcaris? consimilis | Cong, Edgecombe, Daley, Guo, Pates, & Hou | 2018 | (controversial) | Cambrian Stage 3 | China | | Incomplete |
| Lyrarapax unguispinus | Cong, Ma, Hou, Edgecombe, & Strausfield | 2014 | Amplectobeluidae | Cambrian Stage 3 | China | | P-element neck unknown |
| Lyrarapax trilobus | Cong, Daley, Edgecombe, Hou, & Chen | 2016 | Amplectobeluidae | Cambrian Stage 3 | China | | P-element unknown |
| Amplectobelua symbrachiata | Hou, Bergström, & Ahlberg | 1995 | Amplectobeluidae | Cambrian Stage 3 | China | | |
| Amplectobelua stephenensis | Daley & Budd | 2010 | Amplectobeluidae | Wuliuan | United States | | Unknown |
| Guanshancaris kunmingensis | Zhang et al. | 2023 | Amplectobeluidae | Cambrian Stage 4 | China | | Unknown |
| Tamisiocaris borealis | Daley & Peel | 2010 | Tamisiocarididae | Cambrian Stage 3 | Greenland | | Incomplete |
| Ursulinacaris grallae | Pates, Daley & Butterfield | 2019 | Hurdiidae | Wuliuan | Canada China | | Unknown |
| Schinderhannes bartelsi | Kühl, Briggs, & Rust | 2009 | Hurdiidae | Emsian | Germany | Incomplete | Incomplete |
| Stanleycaris hirpex | Pates, Daley, & Ortega-Hernández | 2018 | Hurdiidae | Wuliuan | Canada | | P-element is unknown, possibly absent |
| Peytoia nathorsti | Walcott | 1911 | Hurdiidae | Wuliuan–Drumian | Canada United States | | Incomplete |
| Peytoia infercambriensis (formerly Cassubia infercambriensis) | Lendzion | 1975 | Hurdiidae | Cambrian Stage 3 | Poland | | Unknown |
| Aegirocassis benmoulai | Van Roy, Daley, & Briggs | 2015 | Hurdiidae (Aegirocassisinae) | Tremadocian | Morocco | | |
| Hurdia victoria | Walcott | 1912 | Hurdiidae | Wuliuan–Drumian | Canada Czechia | | |
| Hurdia triangulata | Walcott | 1912 | Hurdiidae | Wuliuan | Canada | | |
| Cambroraster falcatus | Moysiuk & Caron | 2019 | Hurdiidae | Wuliuan | Canada | | |
| Pahvantia hastata | Robison & Richards | 1981 | Hurdiidae | Drumian | United States | | |
| Cordaticaris striatus | Sun, Zeng, & Zhao | 2020 | Hurdiidae | Drumian | China | Incomplete | |
| Zhenghecaris shankouensis | Vanner, Chen, Huang, Charbonnier, & Wang | 2006 | Hurdiidae | Cambrian Stage 3 | China | Unknown | |
| Buccaspinea cooperi | Pates, Lerosey-Aubril, Daley, Kier, Bonino & Ortega-Hernández | 2021 | Hurdiidae | Drumian | United States | | Unknown |
| Titanokorys gainesi | Caron & Moysiuk | 2021 | Hurdiidae | Wuliuan | Canada | | |
| Pseudoangustidontus duplospineus | Van Roy & Tetlie | 2006 | Hurdiidae (Aegirocassisinae) | Tremadocian | Morocco | | Unknown |
| Pseudoangustidontus izdigua | Potin, Gueriau & Daley | 2023 | Hurdiidae (Aegirocassisinae) | Tremadocian | Morocco | | Incomplete |
| Shucaris ankylosskelos | Wu et al. | 2024 | (controversial) | Cambrian Stage 2–Cambrian Stage 3 | China | | Incomplete |
| Stanleycaris qingjiangensis | Wu et al. | 2024 | Hurdiidae | Cambrian stage 3 | China | | Incomplete |
| Mosura fentoni | Moysiuk & Caron | 2025 | Hurdiidae | Wuliuan | Canada | | P-element unknown, possibly absent |
| Falciscaris mumakiana | Potin et al. | 2025 | Hurdiidae | Tremadocian | Morocco | | Unknown |
| Verrocaris kerrymatti | Oxman et al. | 2025 | Anomalocarididae | Cambrian Stage 4 | United States | | Unknown |
| Acanthopahvantia boardmani | Lerosey-Aubril & Ortega-Hernández | 2026 | Hurdiidae | Drumian | United States | Unknown | |

== History ==
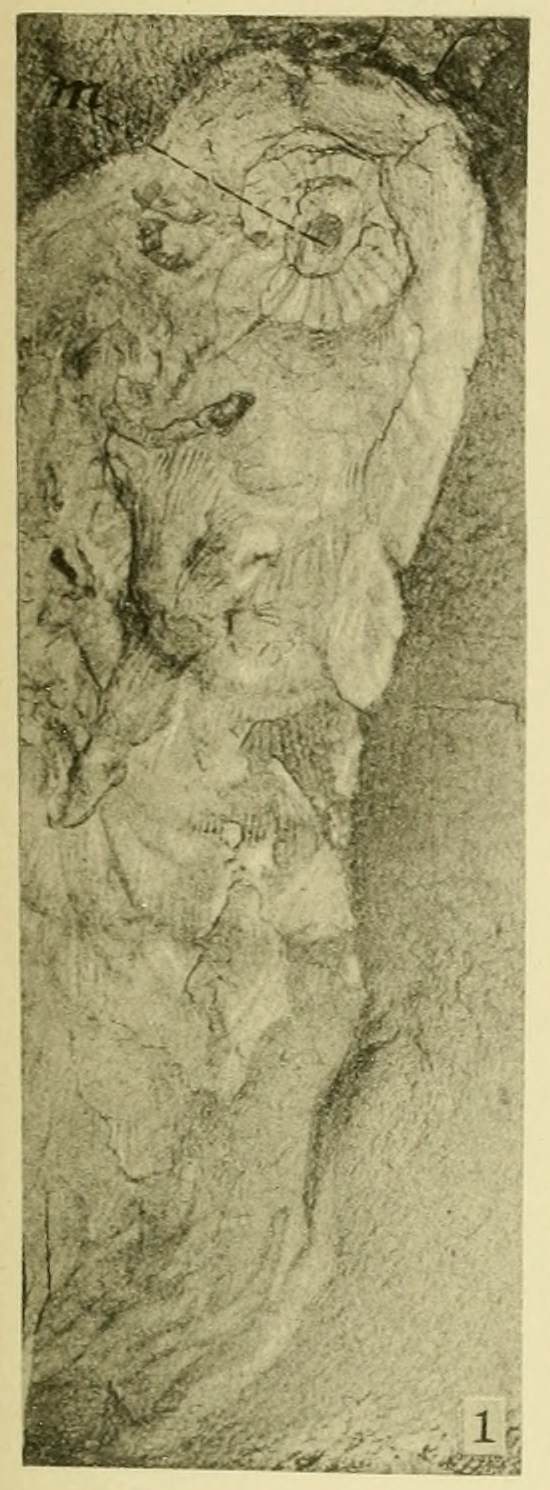
Body specimen of Peytoia nathorsti, the original "Laggania cambria"

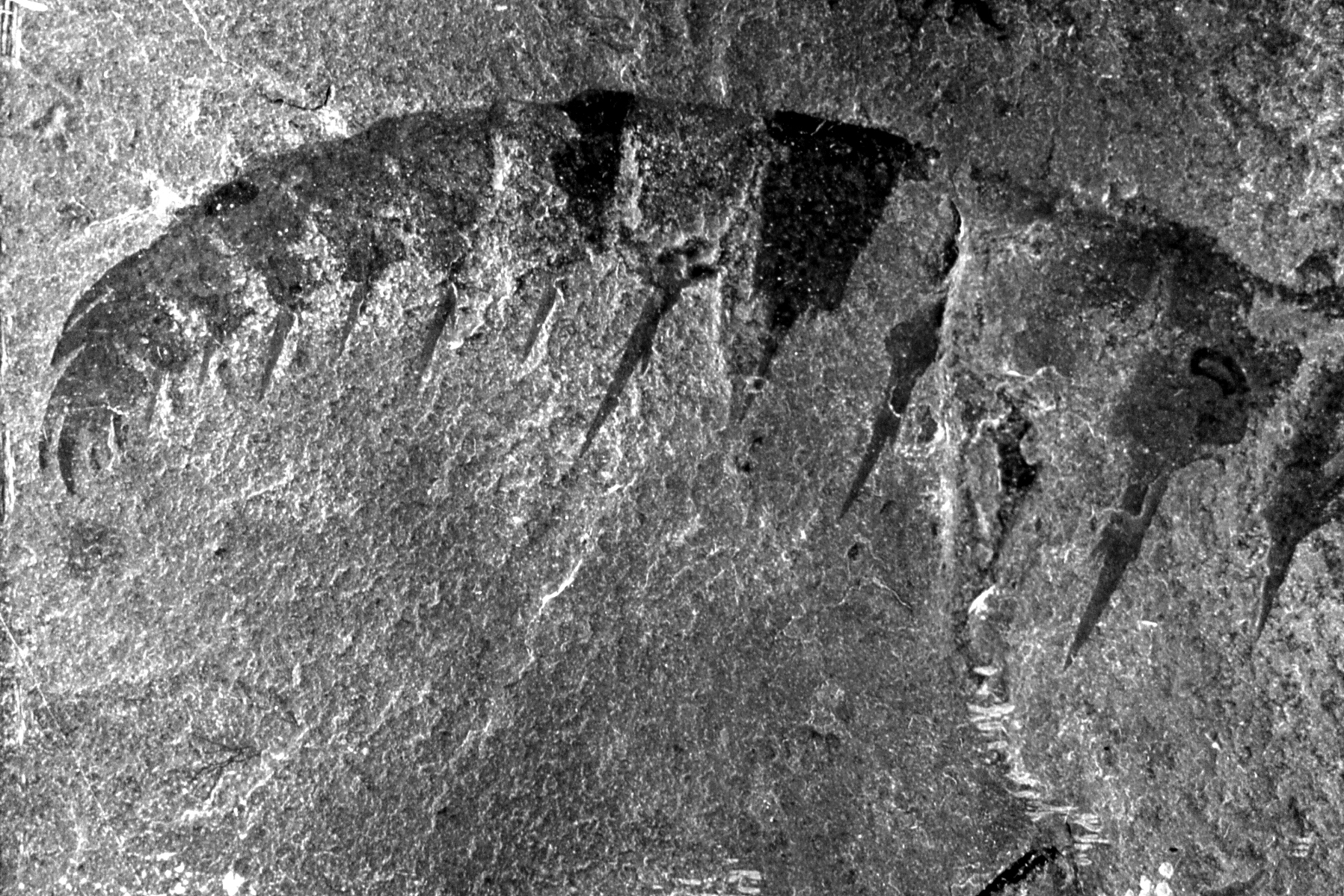
Frontal appendage of Anomalocaris canadensis

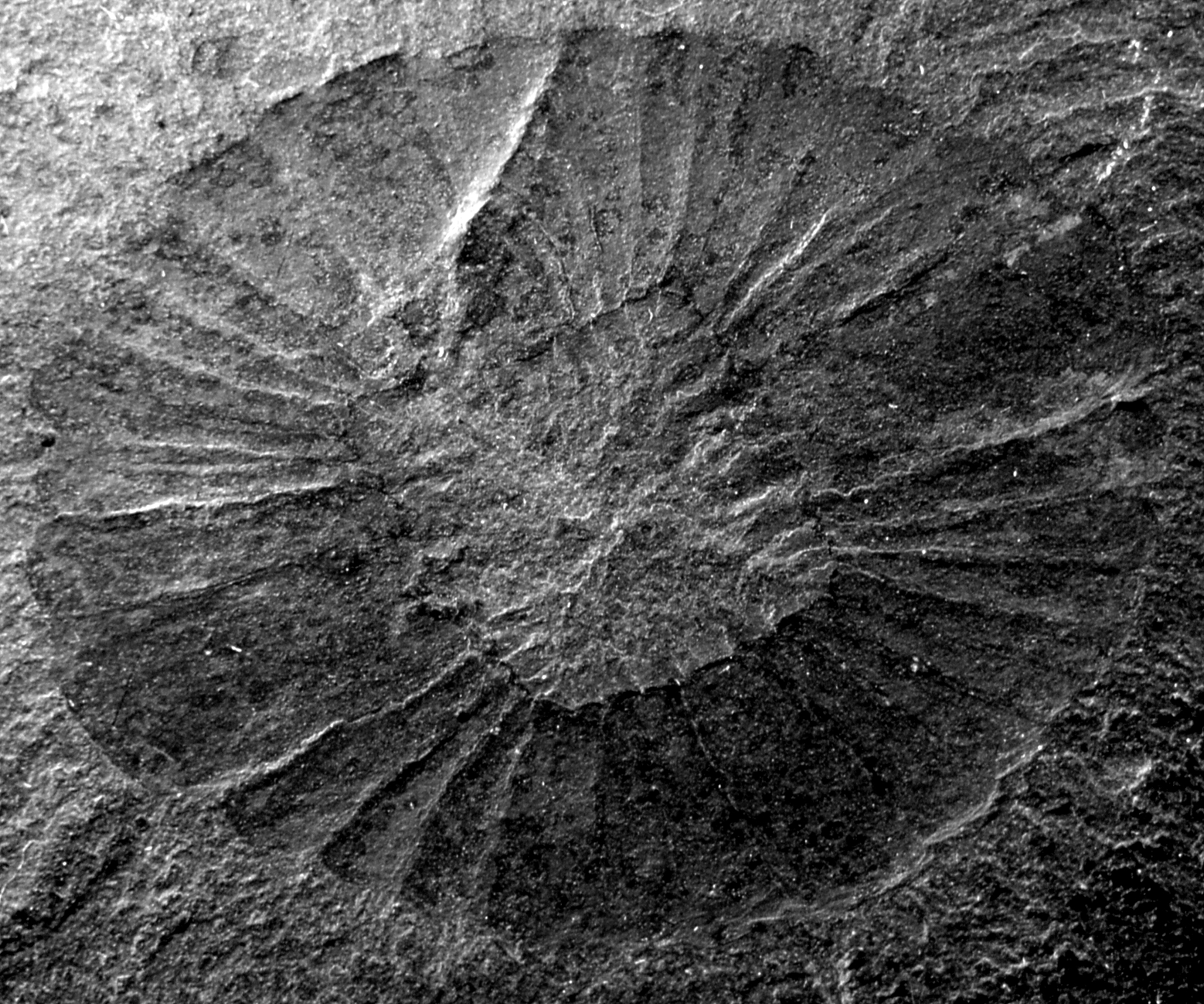
Oral cone of Peytoia nathorsti

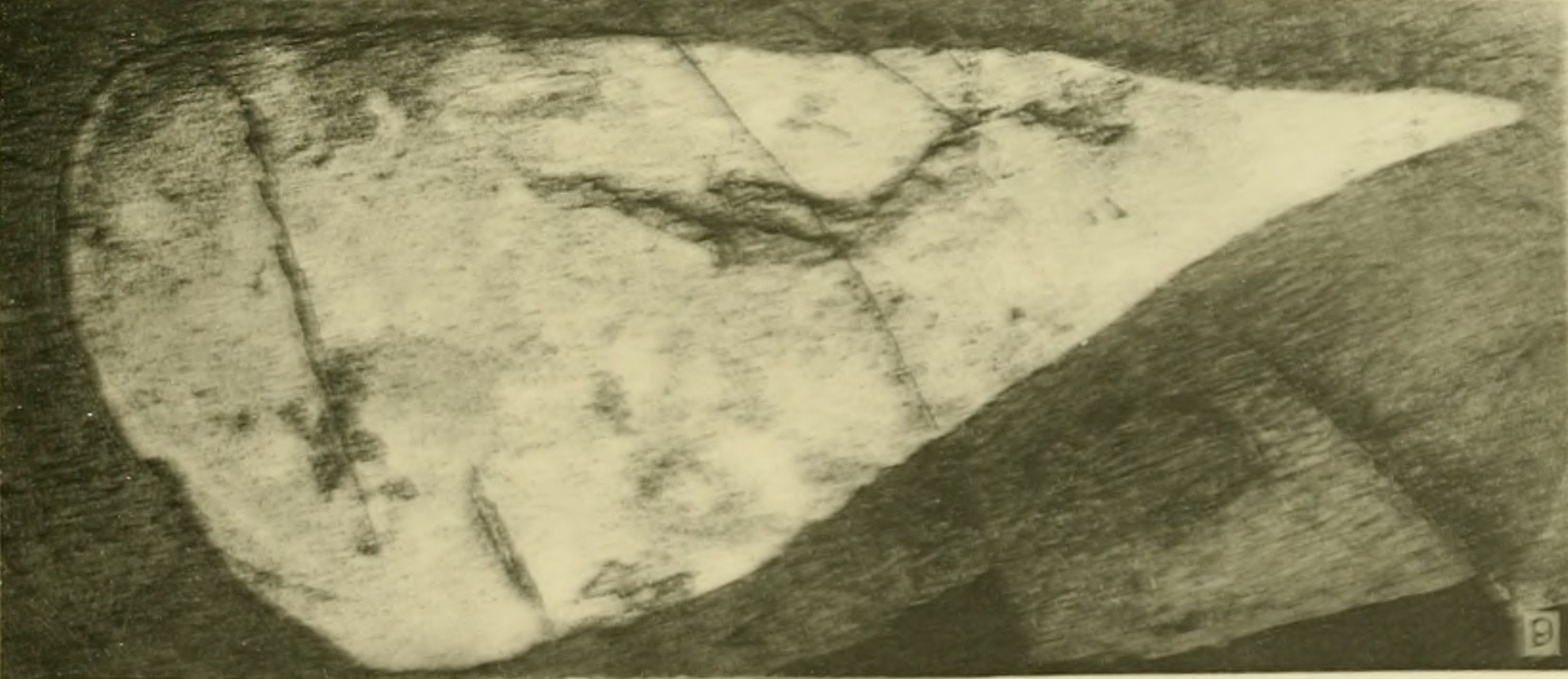
H-element of Hurdia victoria

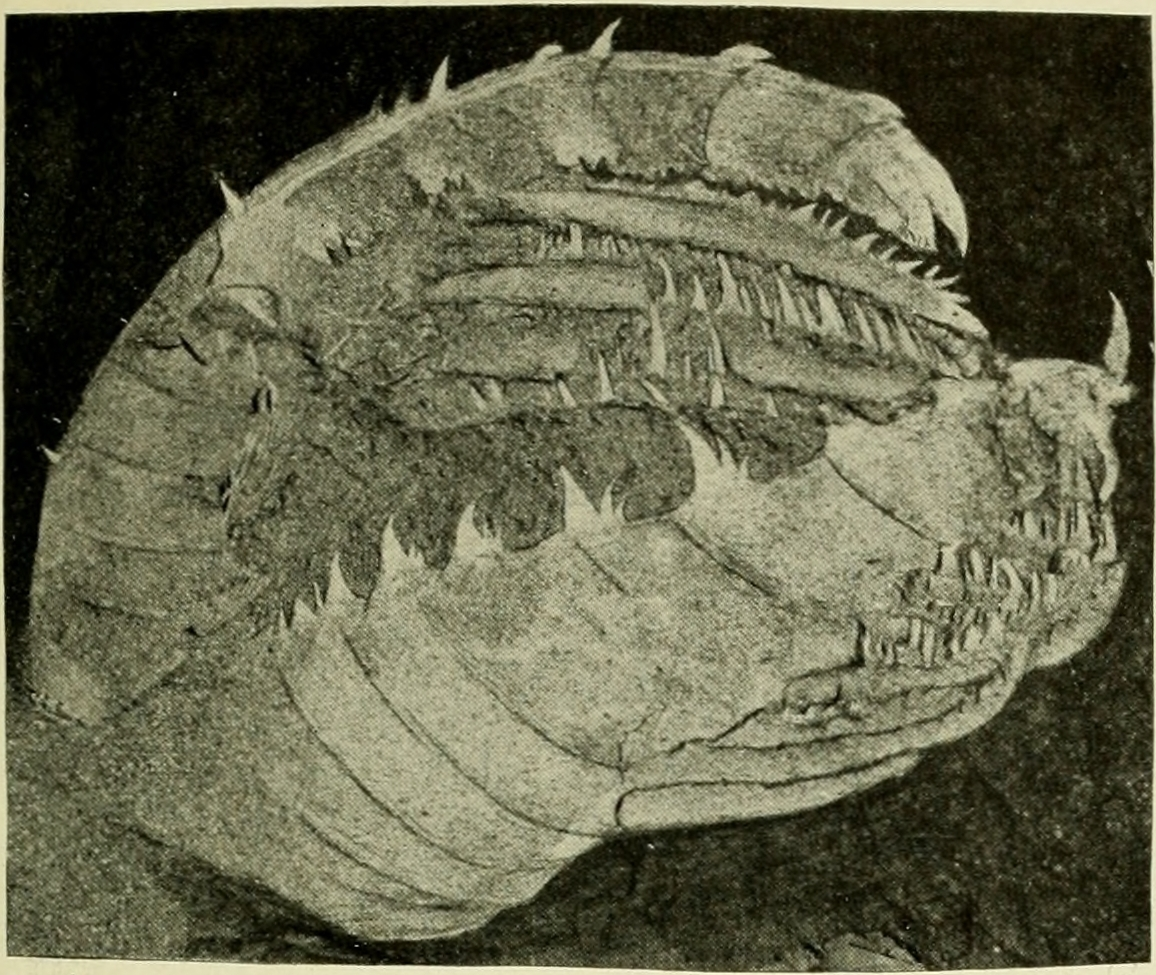
Paired frontal appendages from an unnamed hurdiid radiodont

The history of radiodonts is complex. Incomplete specimens pertaining to different body parts of the same species had historically been interpreted as belonging to different species and even different phyla. Prior to their recognition as a group, radiodont specimens had been assigned to five different phyla: Porifera, Cnidaria, Echinodermata, Annelida, and Arthropoda.

The first known radiodont specimens were collected from the trilobite beds of Mount Stephen by Richard G. McConnell of the Geological Survey of Canada in 1886 or 1888. These specimens were named Anomalocaris canadensis in 1892 by GSC paleontologist Joseph Whiteaves. Whiteaves interpreted the specimens, now known to be isolated frontal appendages, as the abdomen of a phyllocarid crustacean. Additional radiodont specimens were described in 1911 by Charles Walcott. He interpreted an isolated oral cone, which he named Peytoia nathorsti, as a jellyfish, and a poorly preserved but relatively complete specimen, which he named Laggania cambria, as a holothurian. In 1912 Walcott named Hurdia victoria and H. triangulata based on isolated H-elements, which he interpreted as the carapaces of crustaceans. Isolated frontal appendages of Peytoia and Hurdia, collectively known as "Appendage F" in Briggs 1979, were all identified as those of Sidneyia at that time. A Hurdia P-element was named Proboscicaris in 1962, and interpreted as the carapace of a bivalved arthropod.

The Geological Survey of Canada initiated a revision of Burgess Shale fossils in 1966, overseen by Cambridge University paleontologist Harry B. Whittington. This revision would ultimately lead to the discovery of the complete radiodont body plan. In 1978, Simon Conway Morris recognized that the mouthparts of Laggania were Peytoia-like, but he interpreted this as evidence that it was a composite fossil made up of a Peytoia jellyfish and a sponge. In 1979, Derek Briggs recognized that the fossils of Anomalocaris were appendages, not abdomens, but interpreted them as walking legs alongside "Appendage F". It was not until 1985 that the true nature of the fossils of Anomalocaris, Laggania, and Peytoia was recognized, and they were all assigned to a single genus, Anomalocaris. Subsequently, it was recognized that Anomalocaris was a distinct form from the other two, resulting in a split into two genera, the latter of which was variously named Laggania and Peytoia until it was determined that both represent the same species and Peytoia had priority. It was later recognized that some of the fossils assigned to these taxa belonged to another form, which was recognized as bearing a carapace made up of Hurdia and Proboscicaris elements. Finally, in 2009, these specimens were redescribed as Hurdia. Even after these recognitions, partial misidentifications (e.g. oral cone and frontal appendages of Peytoia had been assigned to Anomalocaris and Hurdia, respectively) had been revealed by subsequent studies as well.

The taxon Radiodonta itself was coined in 1996 by Desmond Collins, after it was established that Anomalocaris and its kin represented a distinctive lineage with arthropod affinities rather than a hitherto unknown phylum. Collins also established the class Dinocarida to contain the order Radiodonta as well as the Opabiniidae, which he recognized as distinct due to its lacking the distinctive oral cone structure of radiodonts. Radiodonta was first given a phylogenetic definition in 2014. Radiodonta was originally viewed as containing a single family, Anomalocarididae, but it was divided into four families in 2014: Amplectobeluidae, Anomalocarididae, Cetiocaridae, and Hurdiidae. The name Cetiocaridae did not conform to the International Code of Zoological Nomenclature and so was renamed Tamisiocarididae in 2019.

Until the 2010s, radiodonts were typically considered to be uniformly large apex predators, but discoveries of new species over the course of that decade led to a considerable increase in the known ecological and morphological diversity of the group.
