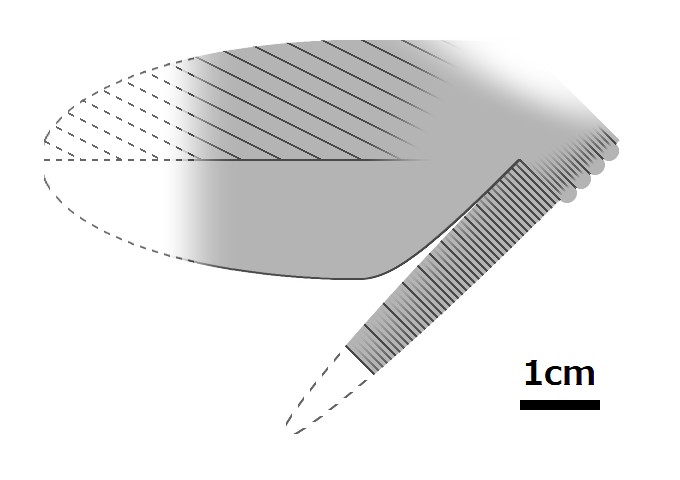
- Trunk appengade of Cucumericrus decoratus

Scientific classification
- Kingdom: Animalia
- Stem group: Arthropoda
- Genus: †Cucumericrus; Hou, Bergstrom & Ahlberg, 1995

Type species
- Cucumericrus decoratus Hou, Bergstrom & Ahlberg, 1995

= Cucumericrus =

Cucumericrus Temporal range: Miaolingian–Middle Cambrian

Extinct genus of arthropod

Cucumericrus ("cucumber-leg") is an extinct genus of stem-arthropod. The type and only species is Cucumericrus decoratus, with fossils discovered from the Maotianshan Shales of Yunnan, China.

== Description ==
Cucumericrus is known from a few poorly preserved specimens. Only fragments of trunk cuticle and corresponding appendages had been revealed, while features, such as head structures, which are important to determining its taxonomy, are unknown. The trunk cuticle possess irregular wrinkles and may had been soft in life. Each of the trunk appendage compose of a dorsal flap-like element and a ventral stubby leg with unknown distal region, structurally comparable to the trunk appendages of gilled lobopodians (dorsal flaps and ventral lobopods) and euarthropod biramous appendages (flap-like exopod and limb-like endopod). Anterior margin of the flap lined with ray-like structures, similar to the body flaps of some radiodonts. The legs have been interpreted as somewhere between annulated lobopod legs and segmented arthropod legs.

== Taxonomic affinities ==
Cucumericrus was originally described as a radiodont alongside Parapeytoia, a genus with somewhat similar trunk appendages, but later revealed to be a megacheiran being misinterpreted as a leg-bearing radiodont at that time. The radiodont affinity of Cucumericrus remain questionable, since the presence of legs is unknown from any other radiodonts and no other radiodont key features (e.g. frontal appendages; oral cone; head sclerites) had been discovered. Only a few phylogenetic analysis including Cucumericrus, either resolving it in a polytomy between euarthropods and other radiodonts (alongside Caryosyntrips) or closer to euarthropods (as a basal deuteropod) than radiodonts.

== See also ==
- Caryosyntrips, another stem-arthropod with similar uncertainties.
- Parapeytoia, a megacheiran once thought to be similarly leg-bearing radiodont.
- Erratus, a basal deuteropod with similar component of trunk appendages.
