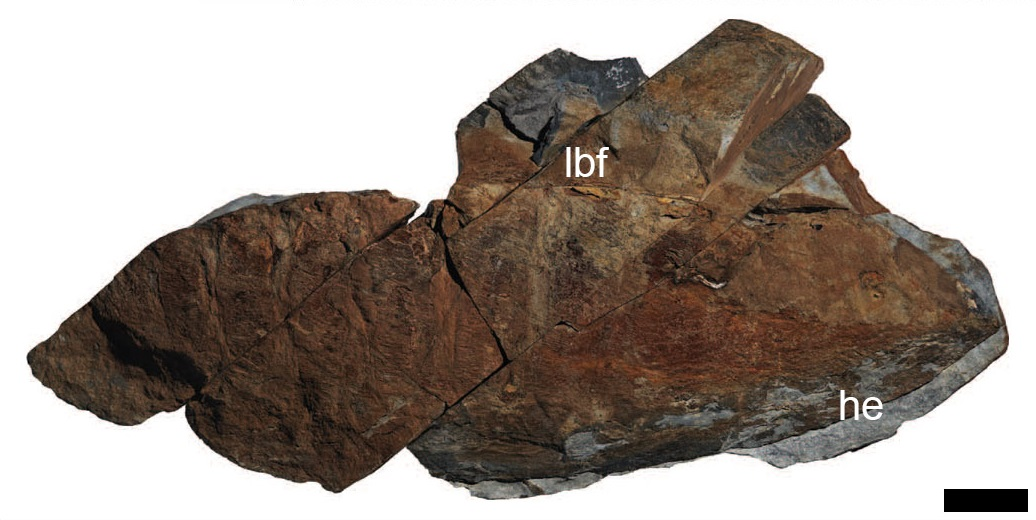
- Fossil holotype
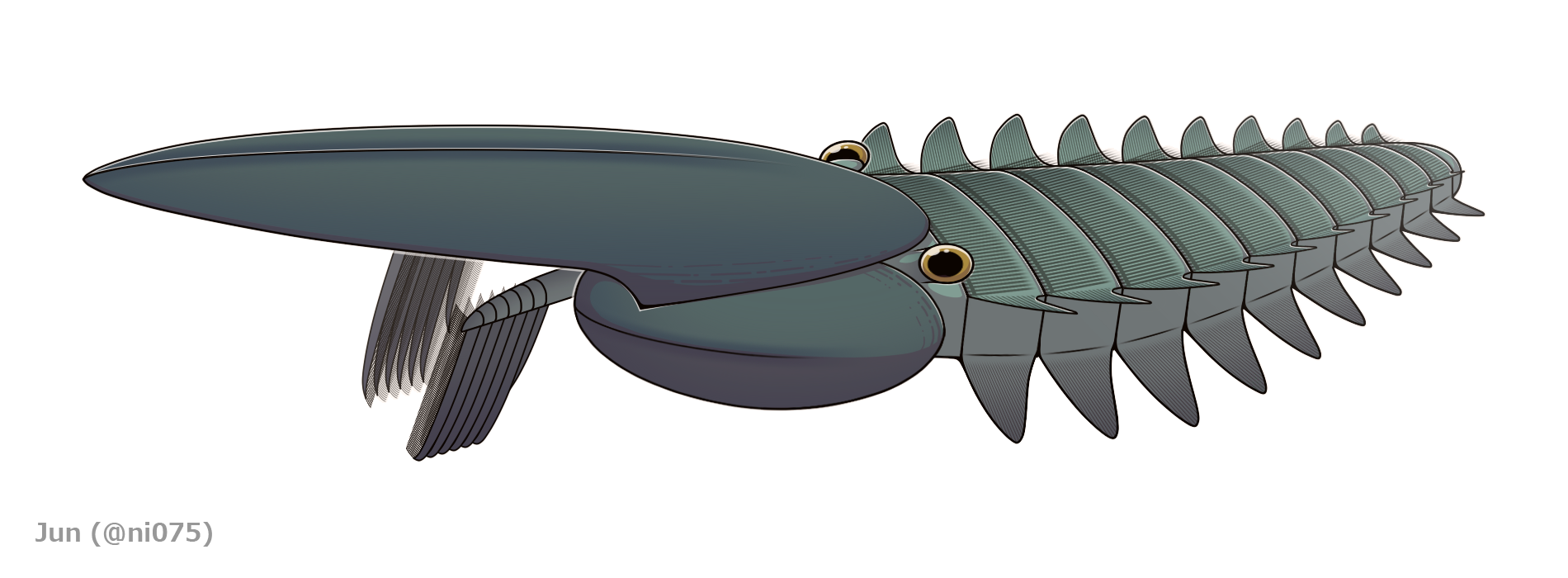
- Reconstruction of Aegirocassis benmoulai

Scientific classification
- Kingdom: Animalia
- Stem group: Arthropoda
- Class: †Dinocaridida
- Order: †Radiodonta
- Family: †Hurdiidae
- Subfamily: †Aegirocassisinae
- Genus: †Aegirocassis
- Species: †A. benmoulai

Binomial name
- †Aegirocassis benmoulai Van Roy, Daley, & Briggs, 2015 (nom. corr. Van Roy et al.)

= Aegirocassis =

Aegirocassis Temporal range: Late Tremadocian, 480 Ma

Extinct genus of radiodonts

Aegirocassis (″Aegir's helmet″) is an extinct genus of giant radiodont arthropod belonging to the family Hurdiidae that lived 480 million years ago during the early Ordovician in the Fezouata Formation of Morocco. It is known by a single species, Aegirocassis benmoulai. (Note: The species was originally termed A. benmoulae, but was corrected to A. benmoulai to comply with the terms of the ICZN.) Van Roy initiated scientific study of the fossil, the earliest known of a "giant" filter-feeder discovered to date. Aegirocassis is considered to have evolved from early predatory radiodonts. This animal is characterized by its long, forward facing head sclerite, and the endites on its frontal appendages that bore copious amounts of baleen-like auxiliary spines. This animal evolving filter-feeding traits was most likely a result of the Great Ordovician Biodiversification Event, when environmental changes caused a diversification of plankton, which in turn allowed for the evolution of new suspension feeding lifeforms. Alongside the closely related Pseudoangustidontus, an unnamed hurdiid from Wales, the middle Ordovician dinocaridid Mieridduryn, and the Devonian hurdiid Schinderhannes, this radiodont is one of the few dinocaridids known from post-Cambrian rocks.

== Description ==
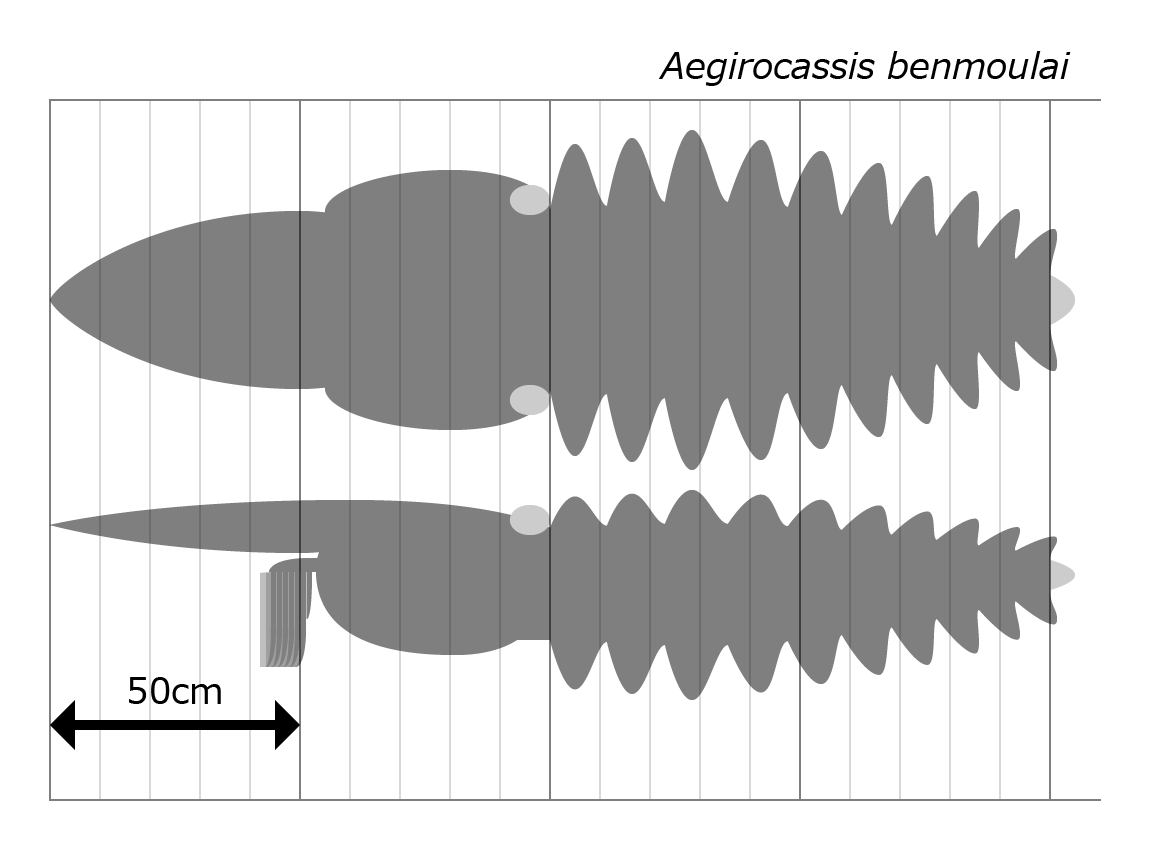
Size estimation (regions in light grey are inferred)

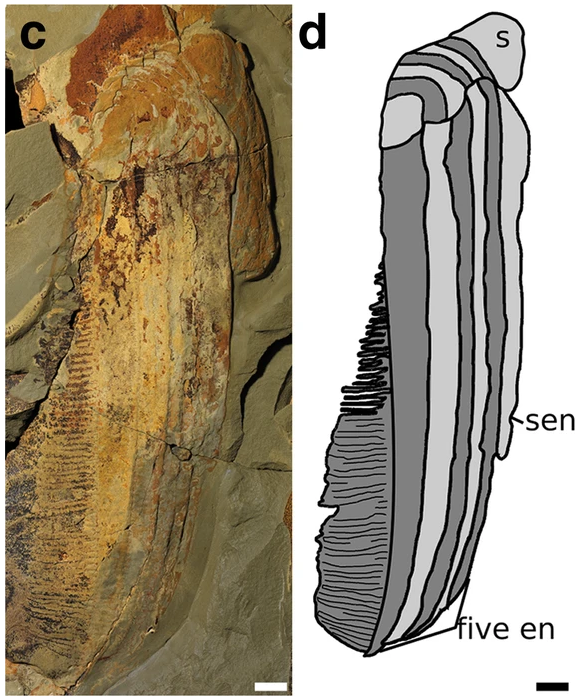
Fossil of frontal appendage

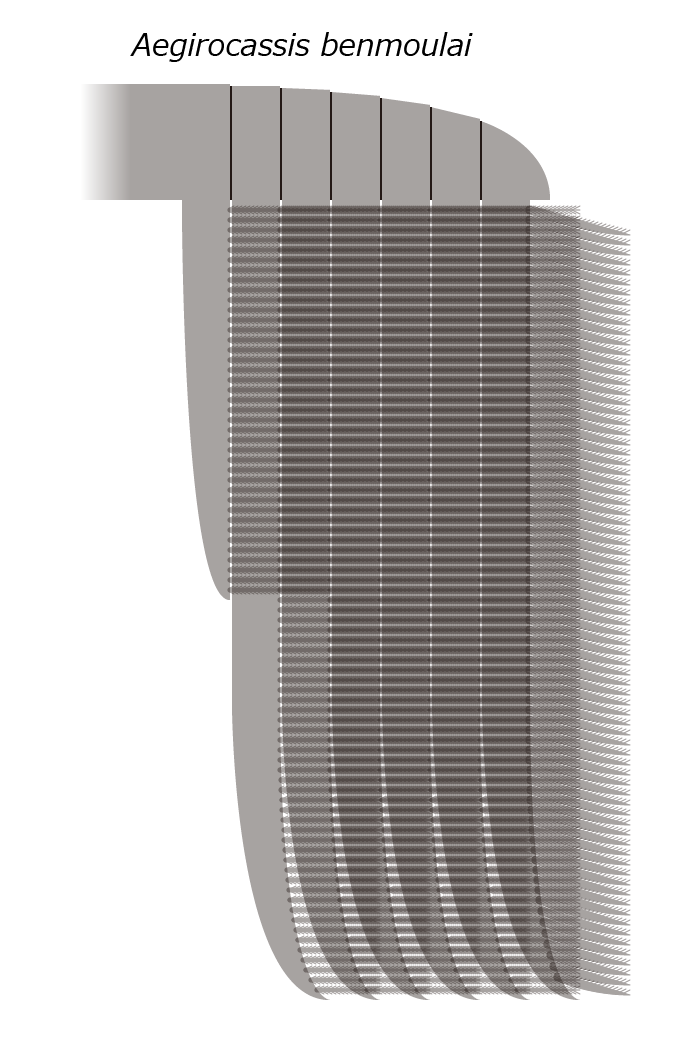
Reconstruction of frontal appendage

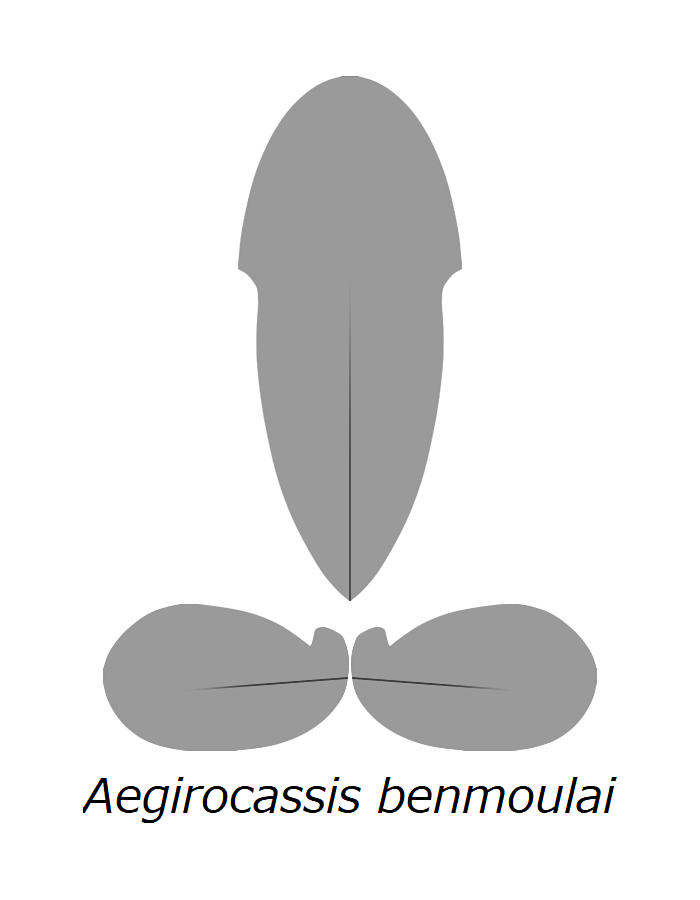
Head sclerite complex

Size of Aegirocassis benmoulai compared to a human

A. benmoulai was the largest known radiodont and the largest known animal that existed in this period, and the length was described as exceeding 2.0 metres (6.6 ft).

The fossil was preserved with exceptional three-dimensional detail, unlike most other radiodont fossils, in which the animals are flattened. The quality of three-dimensional preservation has shed light on the nature of radiodont trunk flaps. Each trunk segment of the Aegirocassis benmoulai specimen has both a ventral and a dorsal pair of flaps. Several details seen clearly in the specimen led to a review and reassessment of research of existing specimens and, most importantly, to the conclusion that the ventral pair are homologous with arthropod endopods (limb-like inner branches) and lobopodian limbs (lobopods), and the dorsal pair are homologous with the flaps of gilled lobopodians and exites (gill-like outer branches) of the arthropod biramous limb. This discovery also found that other hurdiid radiodonts like Peytoia and Hurdia had a dorsal pair of flaps as well.

Frontal appendages of Aegirocassis had 5 endites, and each endites had around 80 setae-like auxiliary spines. These spines are estimated to have been used as a mesh for filter feeding. It was probably able to consume mesozooplankton roughly the same size as the other filter feeding radiodont, Tamisiocaris, was able to catch. However, the spines on the frontal appendages of Aegirocassis are inward-angled, which allowed the spines to overlap to a degree, allowing more control over the size of the filtering mesh. This has led to the estimation that Aegirocassis may have fed on larger size ranges of zooplankton than Tamisiocaris could. In addition, the large carapace (H-element) may have helped to guide the feeding current to the frontal appendages. Eyes and mouthpart (oral cone) are not known from Aegirocassis. Since it was probably a filter feeder, Aegirocassis probably lacked a hard mouthpart and had a flexible one, explaining why mouth structures are not preserved.

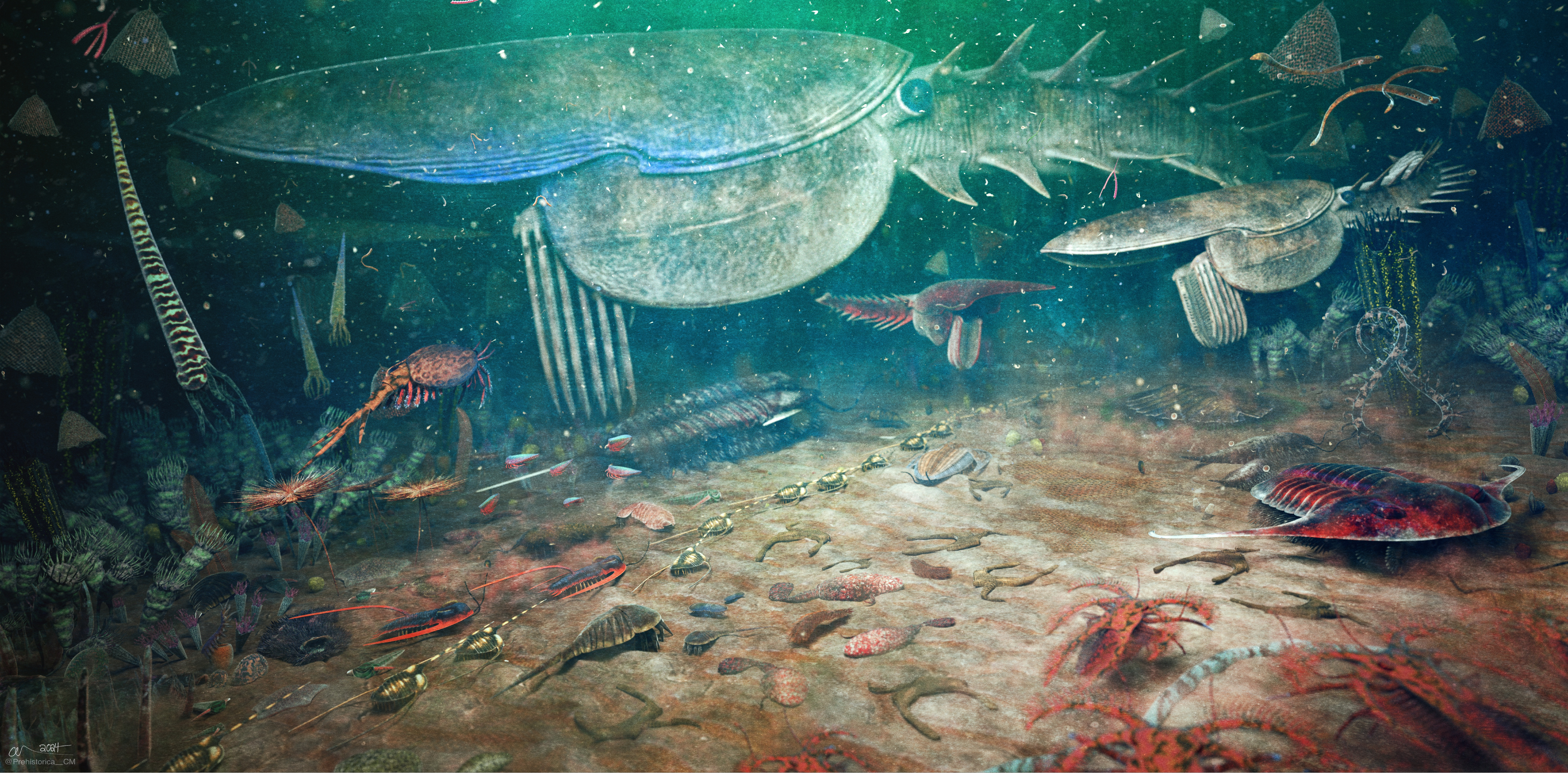
Reconstruction of the Fezouata Biota, featuring roughly 50 different species. The largest animal, Aegirocassis benmoulai (just over 2 metres — 6.6 feet — in length), is depicted in a swimming just above the seafloor.

== Discovery ==
A fossil of A. benmoulai from the Fezouata biota, Morocco was discovered by and named after Mohamed Ben Moula, a fossil collector who recognized its rare characteristics and brought it to the notice of a professional paleontologist, Peter Van Roy, at the Ghent University in Belgium.

== Phylogeny ==
Phylogenetic position of Aegirocassis within Radiodonta and Hurdiidae, according to Moysiuk et al. (2025).

- Radiodonta
  - Echidnacaris briggsi
  - - Houcaris saron
    - - Innovatiocaris maotianshanensis
      - Anomalocaris canadensis
      - - - ?Houcaris magnabasis
          - - Shucaris ankylosskelos
            - - Ramskoeldia
              - Amplectobelua
        - - Laminacaris chimera
          - - Lyrarapax
            - Hurdiidae
              - Mosura fentoni
              - - Schinderhannes bartelsi
                - - - Stanleycaris hirpex
                    - Peytoia nathorsti
                  - - Aegirocassis benmoulai
                    - Hurdiinae
                      - - Hurdia victoria
                        - Hurdia triangulata
                      - - Pahvantia hastata
                        - - Cordaticaris striatus
                          - - Titanokorys gainesi
                            - Cambroraster falcatus
