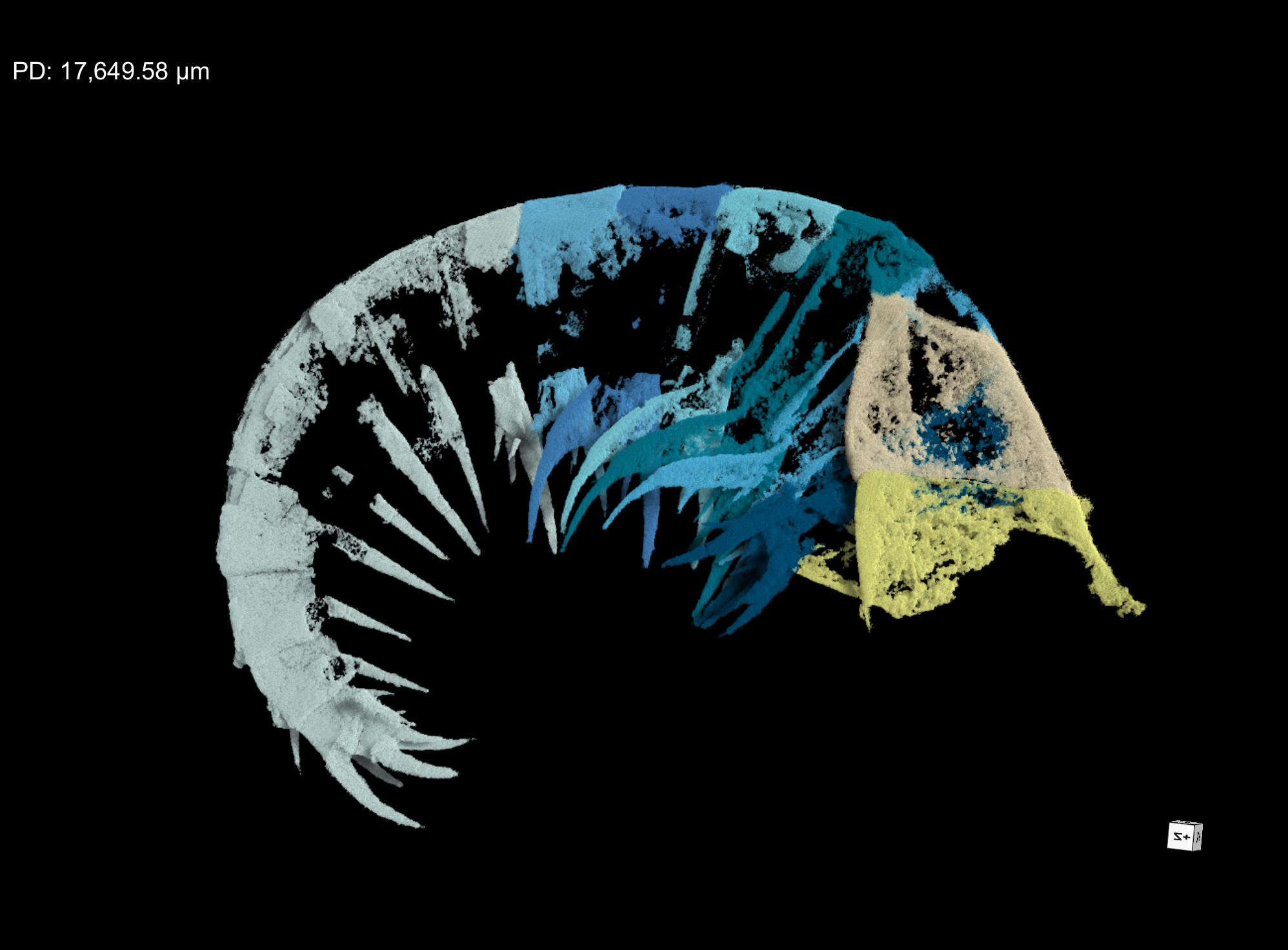
- MicroCT of the holotype, a frontal appendage
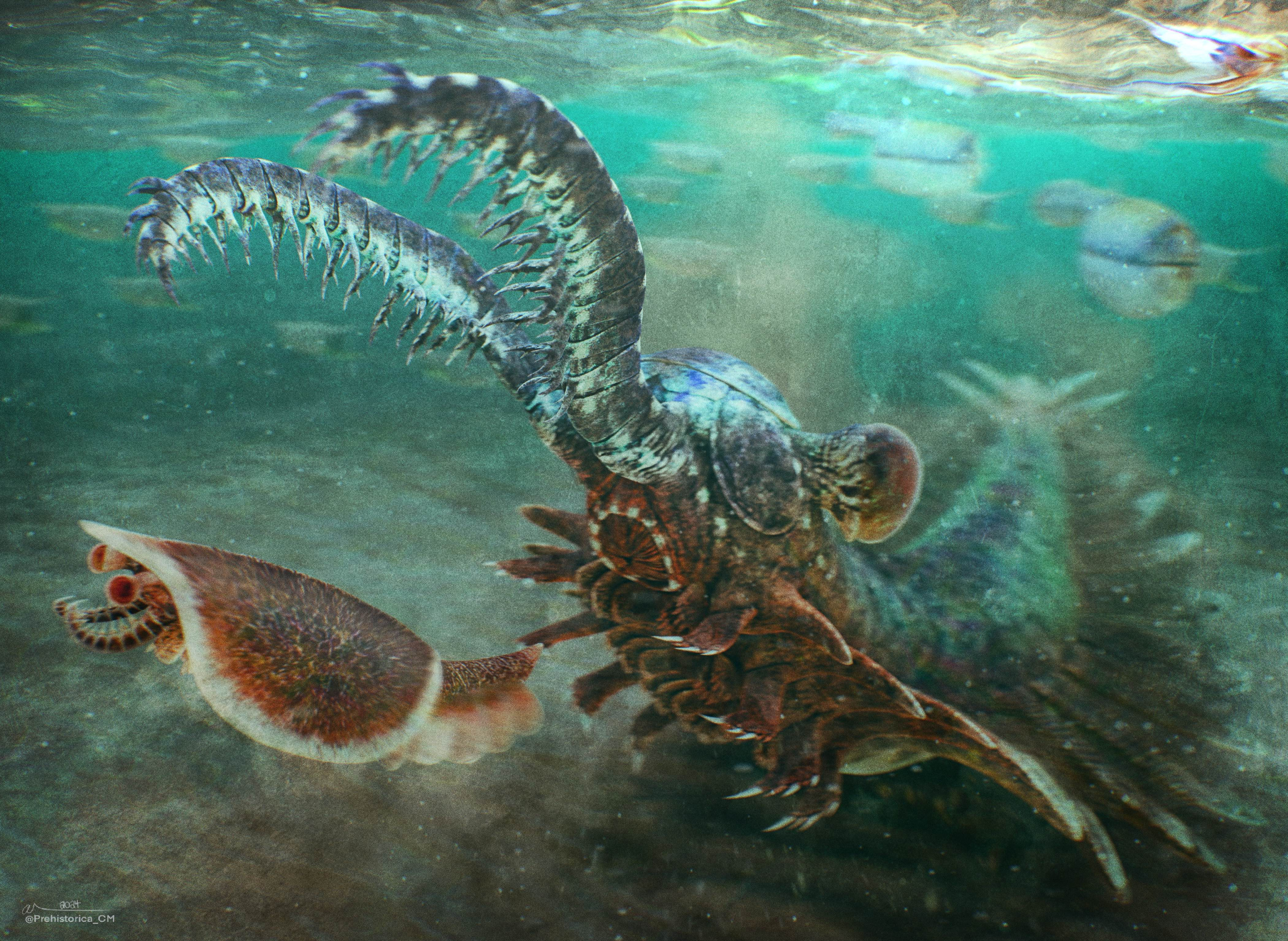
- Life restoration of S. ankylosskelos chasing an Erratus

Scientific classification
- Kingdom: Animalia
- Stem group: Arthropoda
- Class: †Dinocaridida
- Order: †Radiodonta
- Genus: †Shucaris; Wu et al., 2024
- Species: †S. ankylosskelos

Binomial name
- †Shucaris ankylosskelos Wu et al., 2024

= Shucaris =

Shucaris Temporal range: Early Cambrian, Cambrian Stage 3

Genus of radiodont from the Early Cambrian

Shucaris (/ʃuːˈkɑːrɪs/ shoo-KAR-iss; meaning "Shu's shrimp") is a genus of radiodont of uncertain taxonomic placement from the Lower Cambrian Maotianshan Shales in Yunnan, South China. The type and only species is S. ankylosskelos, known from multiple specimens comprising frontal appendages, multiple endites, gnathobase‐like structures, a nearly complete body, a head carapace complex, and one body flap associated with setal blades.

== Description ==
Shucaris is known from multiple specimens which were all referred to S. ankylosskelos by Wu et al. (2024). The holotype, JS-0972B, consists of an isolated frontal appendage. The paratypes, JS-1950 and JS-0658, comprise a nearly complete body specimen, and one partial disarticulated assemblage of a frontal appendage, gnathobase-like structures, an oral cone, portions of the head sclerites, and a flap associated with setal blades, respectively.

=== Appendage morphology ===
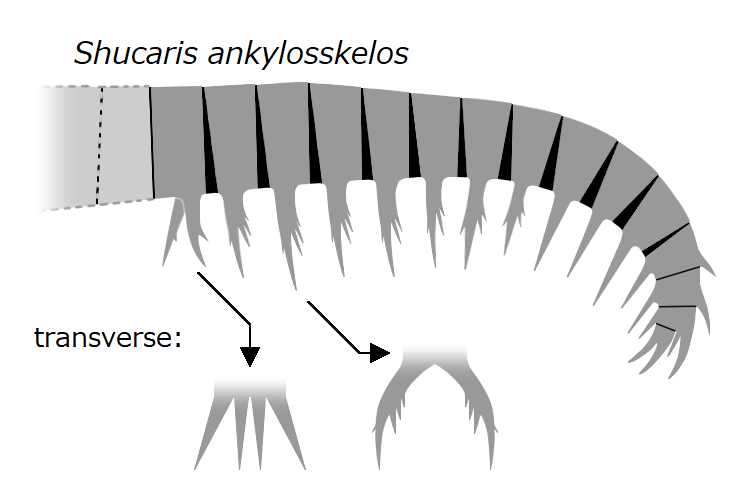
2D reconstruction of Shucaris ankylosskelos frontal appendage

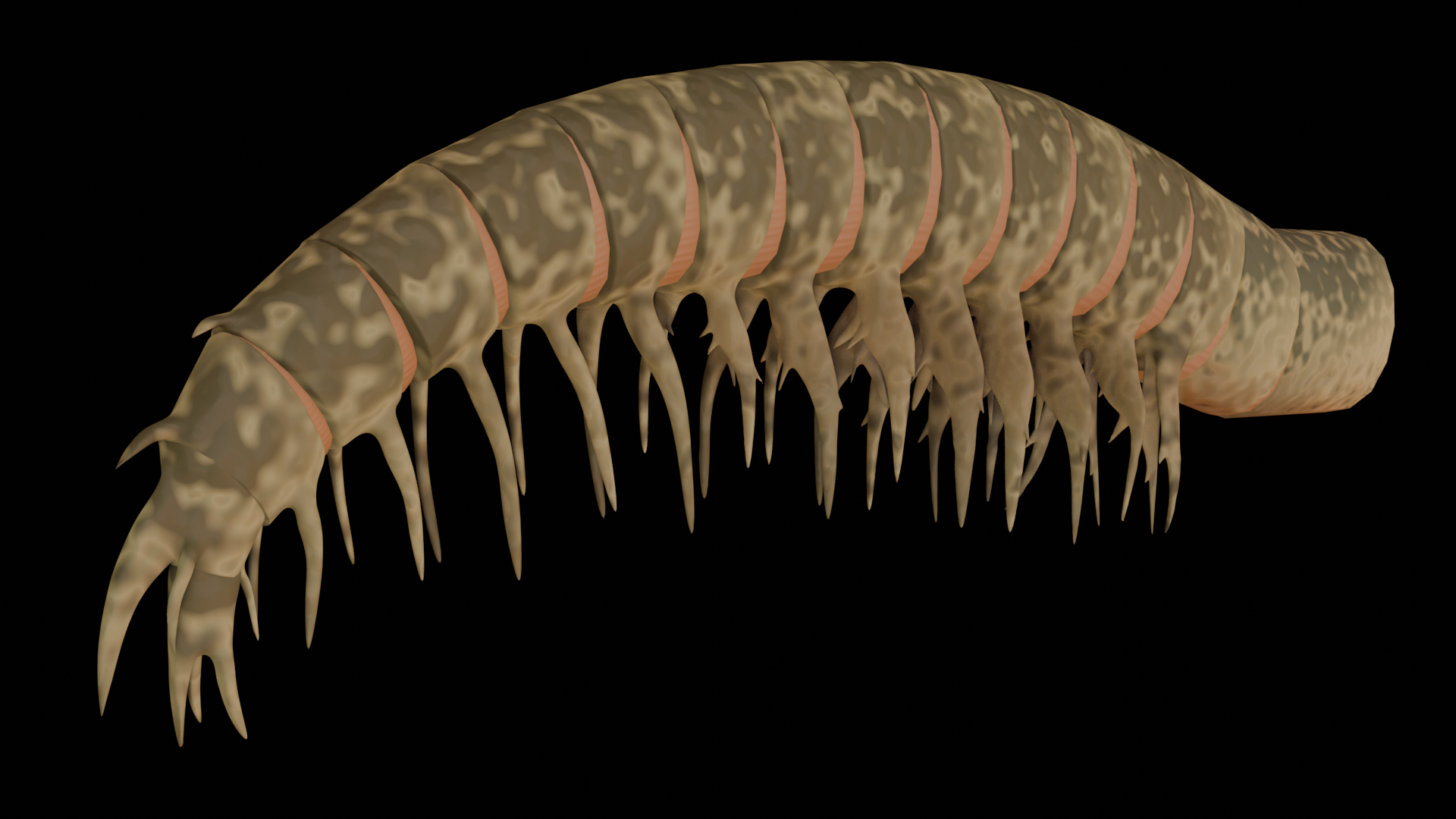
3D reconstruction of Shucaris ankylosskelos frontal appendages

Turntable animation of Shucaris ankylosskelos appendages

Turntable animation of the first DAR podomere

The appendage morphology of Shucaris is unlike any other radiodont in many respects, which makes taxonomic placement difficult. The appendages consist of 2 shaft podomeres and 15 distal articulated region ("DAR", also referred to as the "claw" portion) podomeres, typically found in a furled position. Podomere height decreases distally, with endites roughly the same size as them. The endites are paired, and alternate in length, with odd-numbered podomeres bearing relatively longer spines. The endites of the more proximal podomeres curve strongly inward, with auxiliary spines facing inward and laterally These auxiliary spines become larger approaching the tip of the endite. Auxiliary spines are more numerous on the anterior edge of the endites, with up to 4 auxiliary spines anteriorly and 2 posteriorly on proximal podomeres, and fewer towards the distal portion of the appendage. The endites of DAR podomeres 8-14 (up to the terminal 15th DAR podomere) are poorly preserved, and probably only bear at most a single auxiliary spine each. The 1st DAR podomere shows characteristics that are unusual for radiodonts. It bears two pairs of endites lying on the same lateral axis, with one pair in between the other. The outer pair curves distally, while the inner pair is mostly straight and points posteriorly. Both pairs bear a single auxiliary spine on each endite on their distal margin. DAR podomeres 12–15 have dorsal spines, with the largest one on the 14th podomere. The 14th DAR podomere also bears a secondary dorsal spine. The terminal spine is paired, which isn't observed in any other known radiodonts.

== Etymology ==
The generic name is Shucaris. 'Shu' honours Professor Degan Shu, the pioneer in the research on the Chengjiang biota and the academic leader of the Early Life Research Team at Northwest University. 'Caris', translating to ‘shrimp’ from Latin, is a commonly used suffix for marine euarthropods. The specific name, ankylosskelos, derives from the Greek words for 'curved' and 'leg' respectively, alluding to the curved frontal appendage.

== Classification ==
In previous studies, Shucaris was referred to as "Radiodont C" and has been recovered as an amplectobeluid and a basal anomalocaridid. The results of some of these papers' phylogenetic studies have been reproduced below:

McCall 2023: Majority-rule (50%) consensus

- Anomalocarididae
  - - Anomalocaris canadensis
    - Anomalocaris aff.canadensis
    - Anomalocaris daleyae
  - - Innovatiocaris
    - - Anomalocaris magnabasis
      - Amplectobeluidae
        - - Laminacaris sp.
          - - Guanshancaris
            - Laminacaris chimera
        - - - Ramskoeldia
            - - Radiodont C
              - - Innovatiocaris? sp.
                - Innovatiocaris? multispiniformis
          - - "Anomalocaris" sp. (Balang)
            - - Parker Slate Radiodont
              - Houcaris consimilis?
              - - Houcaris consimilis
                - Houcaris saron
              - - - Amplectobelua aff. trispinata
                  - Amplectobelua trispinata
                - - Lyrarapax unguispinus
                  - - Amplectobelua stephenensis
                    - Lyrarapax trilobus

Zheng 2022: Parsimony-Implied weights (K=3)

- Radiodonta
  - Hurdiidae
  - - - Innovatiocaris
      - - Anomalocaris kunmingensis
        - Laminacaris
    - - Radiodont C
      - - - Anomalocaris canadensis
          - - Anomalocaris aff. canadensis
            - Ramskoeldia
            - Tamisiocarididae
        - Amplectobeluidae

Wu et al. (2024) recovered Shucaris as a radiodont of uncertain relation—often as a member of the Anomalocarididae—in their phylogenetic analyses. Their results are shown below:

Topology A: Parsimony-Equal weights

- Anomalocarididae
  - Shucaris
  - - - Amplectobeluidae
      - - - Anomalocaris spp.
          - Paranomalocaris spp.
          - - Ramskoeldia
            - Lenisicaris spp.

Topology B: Parsimony-Implied weights (K=3) & Topology C: Parsimony-Implied weights (K=7)

- Anomalocarididae
  - Shucaris
  - - Anomalocaris spp.
    - - Ramskoeldia
      - - Lenisicaris pennsylvanica
        - - Lenisicaris lupaata
          - - Caryosyntrips
            - - Paranomalocaris spp.

Despite this however, Wu et al., (2024) discuss novel features Shucaris possesses such as "more podomeres in the claw region than all amplectobeluids and most anomalocaridids", leading them to recover Shucaris as "the most basal taxon within Anomalocarididae or a sister taxon to the clade comprising amplectobeluids and anomalocaridids".

== Paleobiology ==
Shucaris had an abnormally small oral cone, suggesting that it likely chewed up prey with its gnathobase-like structures and then swallowed it. This implies that it had a similar diet to amplectobeluids, with both being nektobenthic predators consuming hard-shelled prey.
