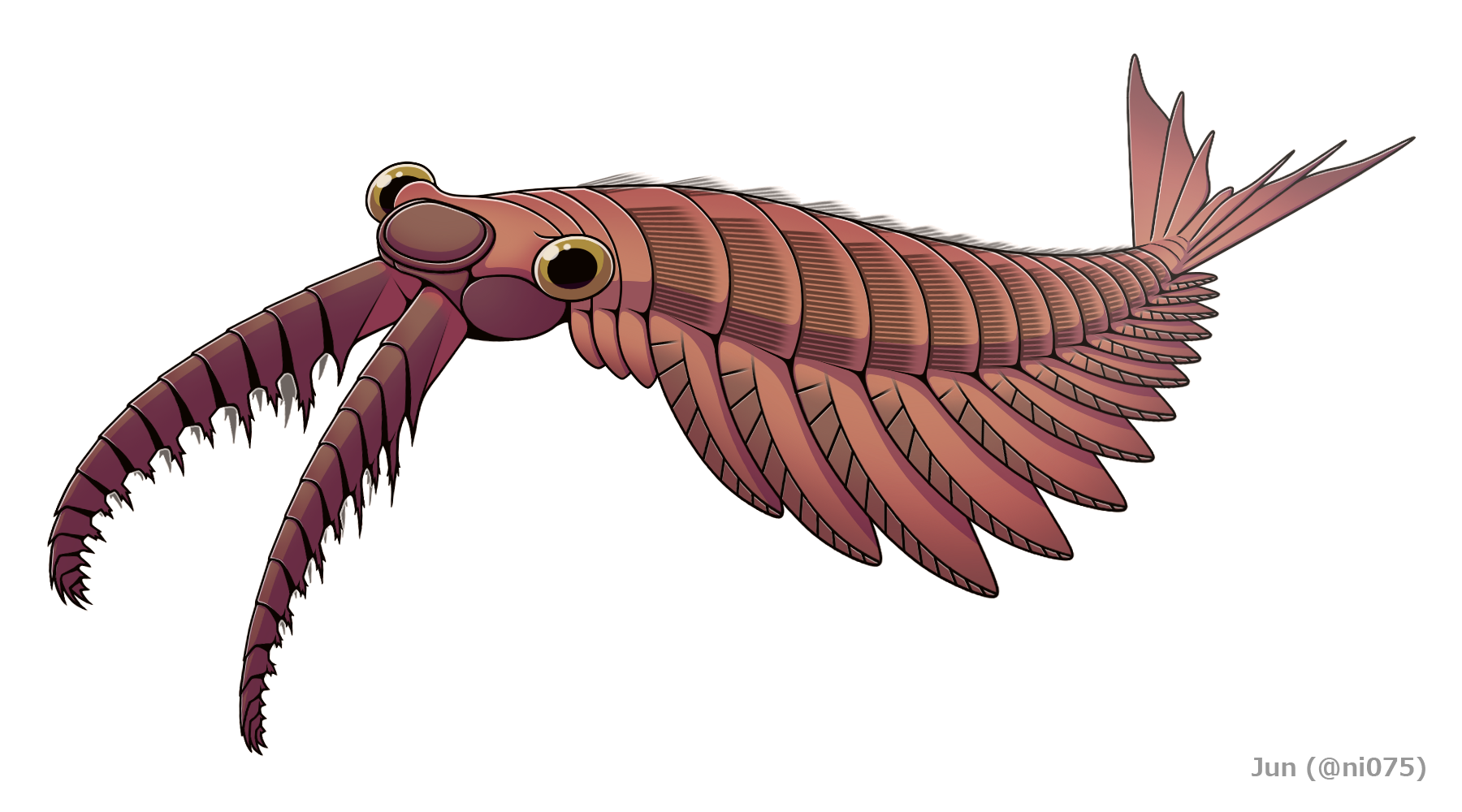
- Anomalocaris canadensis
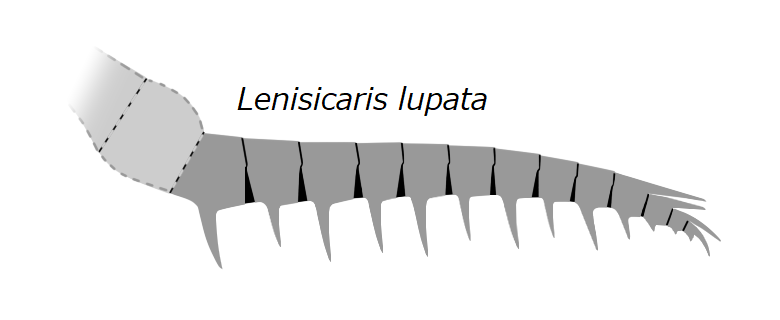
- Lenisicaris lupata

Scientific classification
- Kingdom: Animalia
- Stem group: Arthropoda
- Class: †Dinocaridida
- Order: †Radiodonta
- Family: †Anomalocarididae; Raymond, 1935

Genera
- †Anomalocaris; †Lenisicaris; †Paranomalocaris?; †Shucaris?; †Verrocaris

= Anomalocarididae =

Anomalocarididae Temporal range: Cambrian Series 2-Miaolingian (Cambrian Stage 3-Guzhangian) ~520–500 Ma

Clade of extinct arthropods

Anomalocarididae (occasionally mis-spelt Anomalocaridae) is an extinct family of Cambrian radiodonts, a group of stem-group arthropods.

Around 1990s and early 2010s, Anomalocarididae included all radiodont species, hence the previous equivalent of the common name "anomalocaridid" to the whole Radiodonta. This is no longer the case after the revision done by Vinther et al. 2014, as Anomalocarididae restricted to only Anomalocaris and, if any, a few of closely related genera since then. Wu et al. 2021 accepted only Anomalocaris (excluding "A." saron, "A." kunmingensis and "A." briggsi) and Lenisicaris as the member of Anomalocarididae, while Paranomalocaris is questionably included by some studies as well. Since then, other species labeled under the Anomalocaris genus, like ''A.'' saron have been reassigned to their own genus (like in the case of ''A.'' saron being redescribed as Innovatiocaris).

Anomalocarididae distinguished from the similar family Amplectobeluidae (e.g. Amplectobelua, Lyrarapax) by the presence of triradial oral cone and non-hypertrophied first distal endite. Compared to Hurdiidae and Tamisiocarididae, these two radiodont families shared a lot of characters (i.e. alternated endite length; streamlined body; small head with ovoid sclerites; well-developed swimming flaps; caudal furcae; raptorial predatory lifestyle) and forming a clade in multiple phylogenetic analysis.

== See also ==
- Lenisicaris
