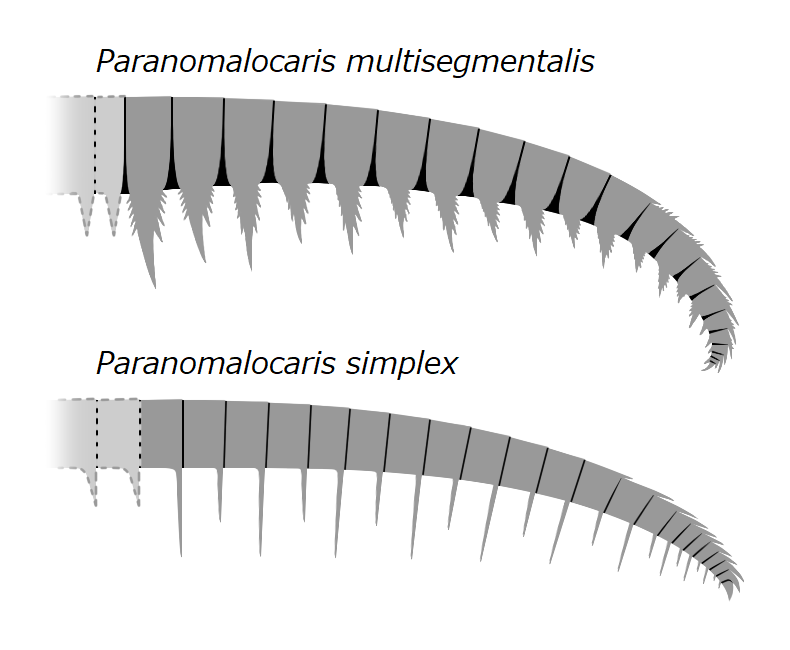
- Frontal appendages of Paranomalocaris
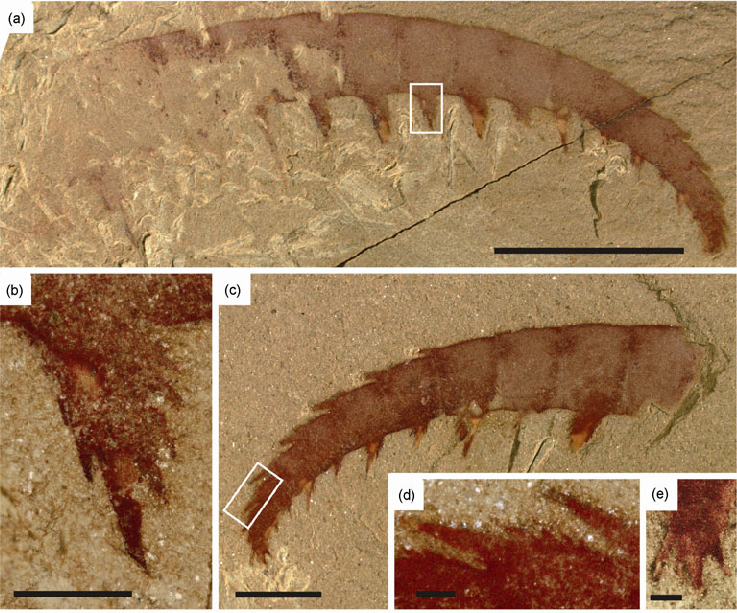
- Holotype of P. multisegmentalis

Scientific classification
- Kingdom: Animalia
- Stem group: Arthropoda
- Class: †Dinocaridida
- Order: †Radiodonta
- Family: †Anomalocarididae (?)
- Genus: †Paranomalocaris; Wang, Huang & Hu, 2013

Type species
- Paranomalocaris multisegmentalis Wang, Huang & Hu, 2013

Other species
- Paranomalocaris simplex Jiao et al. 2021

= Paranomalocaris =

Paranomalocaris Temporal range: Cambrian Stage 4

Extinct genus of radiodonts

Paranomalocaris is a genus of radiodont recovered from the Cambrian Stage 4 aged Wulongqing Formation, eastern Yunnan. It contains two species, Paranomalocaris multisegmentalis and P. simplex. It is only known from its frontal appendages.

== Morphology ==
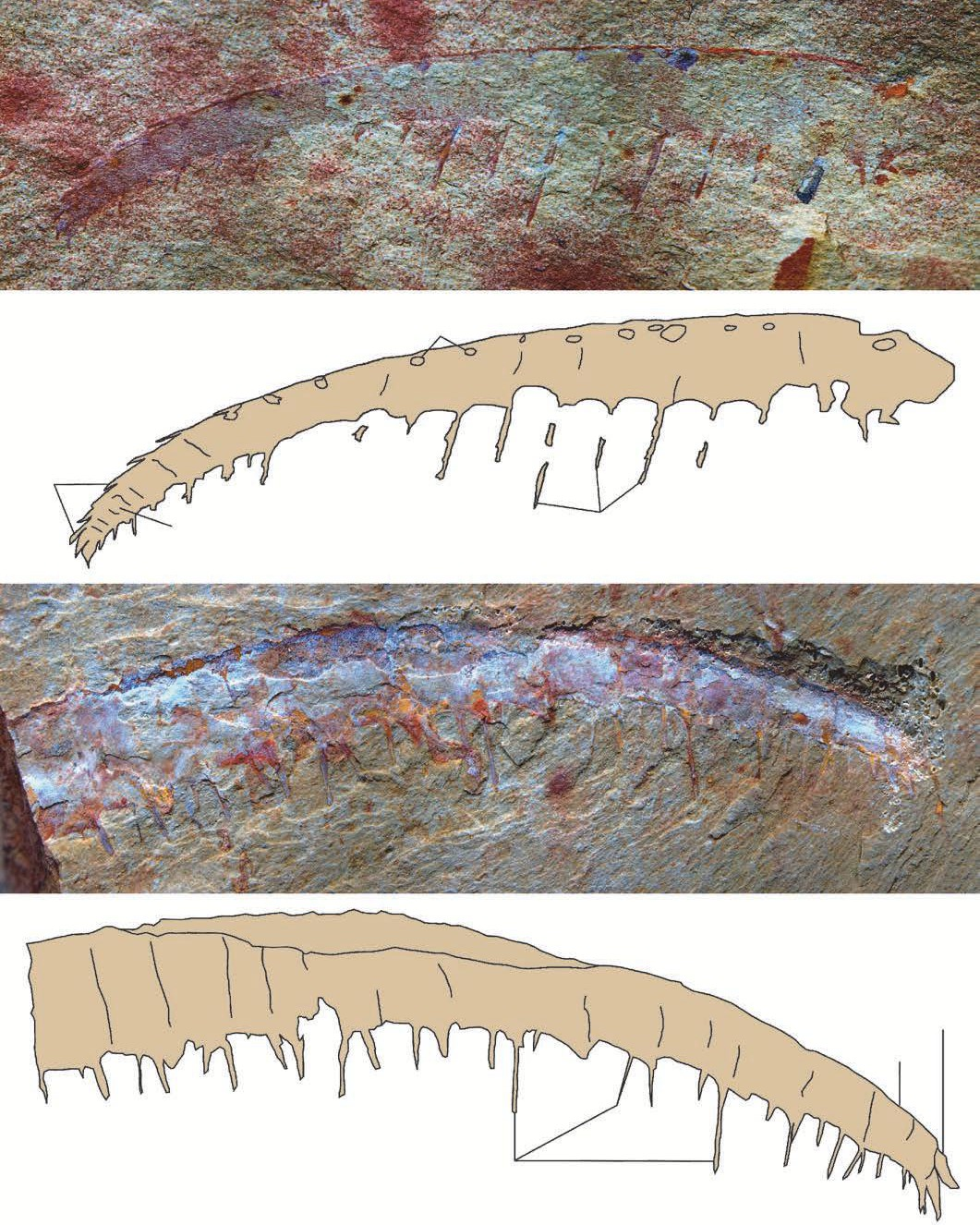
Fossil specimens of P. simplex

As the generic name suggest, Paranomalocaris frontal appendages resembling those of Anomalocaris at first glance, but distinctive by its excessive number of podomeres (segments), hence the specific name multisegmentalis for the type species. While most radiodont frontal appendages only have 16 (13 excluding the shaft/base region) or fewer podomeres, there are at least 17 segments in P. simplex and up to 22 segments in P. multisegmentalis.

The 2 species of Paranomalocaris differ by their endites (inner spines), where they are short and have many auxiliary spines in P. multisegmentalis, but simple and needle-like in P. simplex, hence the specific name. P. multisegmentalis also characterized by dorsal spines with serrated margin, a feature which is unique among radiodonts.

== Paleobiology ==
Paranomalocaris may had been a predatory radiodont. The frontal appendages with excessive podomeres suggest a wide range of movement, and the many well developed endites imply a grasping and trapping function, specifically suitable for catching small and agile preys.

== Taxonomy ==
Most phylogenetic analysis recovered Paranomalocaris as a member within the Anomalocarididae+Amplectobeluidae clade, but the deeper taxonomic position is uncertain. Some suggest it was part of Anomalocarididae, while others suggest it was basal than both families or closer to Ramskoeldia.
