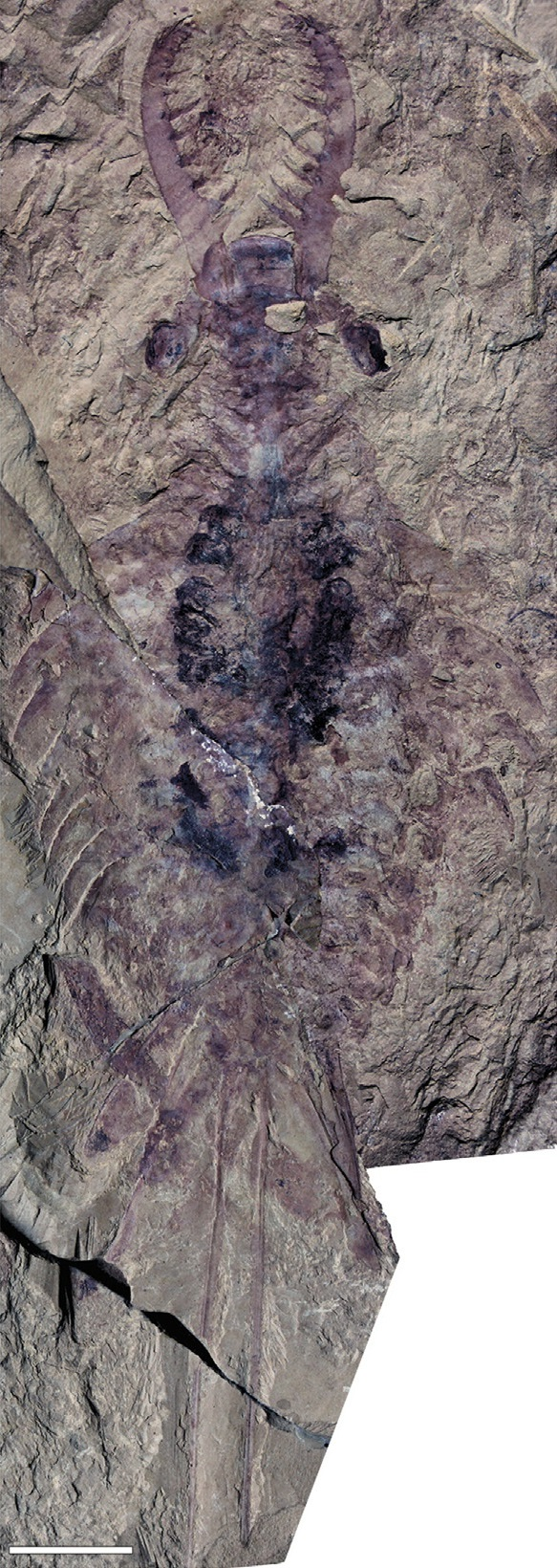
- Holotype of I. maotianshanensis

Scientific classification
- Kingdom: Animalia
- Stem group: Arthropoda
- Class: †Dinocaridida
- Order: †Radiodonta
- Genus: †Innovatiocaris; Zeng et al., 2022

Type species
- †Innovatiocaris maotianshanensis Zeng et al., 2022

Other species
- †I.? multispiniformis Zeng et al., 2022

= Innovatiocaris =

Innovatiocaris Temporal range: Cambrian Series 2, Stage 3, 518.03 Ma

Extinct genus of radiodonts

Innovatiocaris ("innovation crab") is an extinct genus of radiodont arthropod from the early Cambrian Chengjiang Lagerstätte of Yunnan Province, China. The genus may contain two named species, I. maotianshanensis, known from a nearly complete young individual measuring up to 15.2 cm (6.0 in) and isolated frontal appendages, and I.? multispiniformis, known from a complete frontal appendage.

== Discovery and naming ==
=== Innovatiocaris maotianshanensis ===
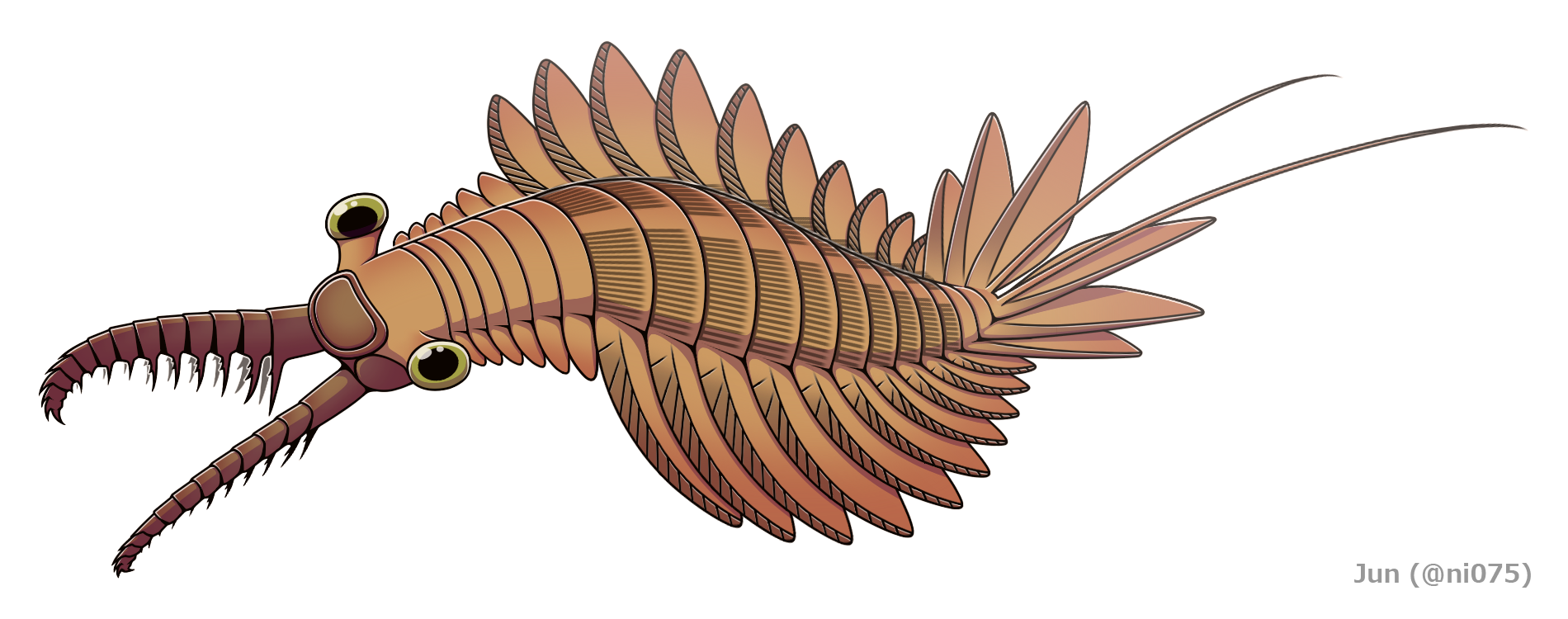
Life restoration

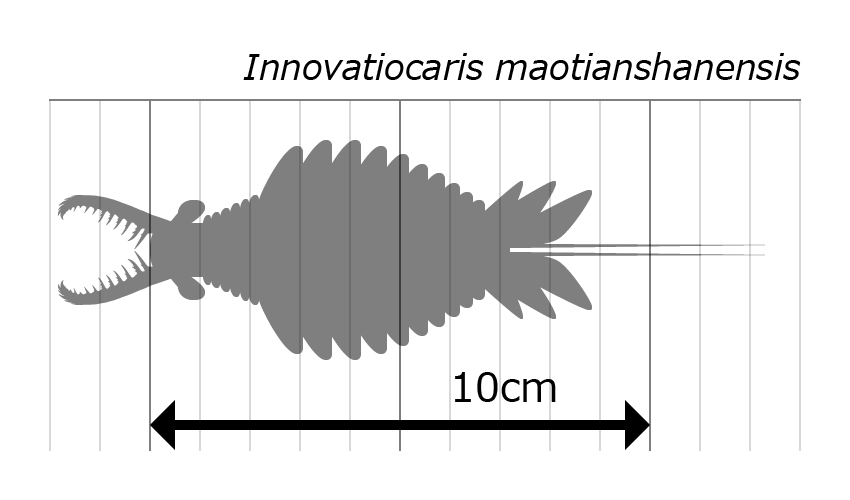
Size diagram

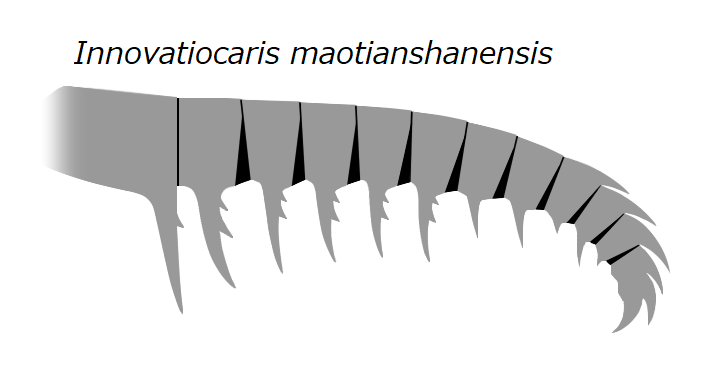
I. maotianshanensis frontal appendage

Life restoration of Innovatiocaris

The holotype specimen of Innovatiocaris maotianshanensis, ELRC 20001 was long considered in scientific literature as "Anomalocaris sp". or Anomalocaris saron (=Houcaris saron). However, in 2022, Zeng et al. described it as a new genus and species of radiodont. The holotype consists of the nearly complete remains of a young individual, preserved on a part and counterpart. Although a brief description of the specimen was provided by Chen et al. (1994), and despite its popularity, it did not receive a detailed description until 2022. ELRC 20011 and 20012, additional specimens collected in 1990, consist of isolated frontal appendages. These were designated as paratypes. The specimens were collected from the Maotianshan Shale of the Yu'anshan Formation of Maotianshan, Chengjiang, in Yunnan Province, China.

The generic name, "Innovatiocaris", combines the Latin innovatio 'innovation' (honoring the innovative spirit of Junyuan Chen, a scientist who contributed to the research of the Chengjiang Lagerstätte) and the Greek καρίς karís 'shrimp or crab'. The specific name, maotianshanensis references Maotianshan, the location where the holotype was discovered.

=== Innovatiocaris? multispiniformis ===
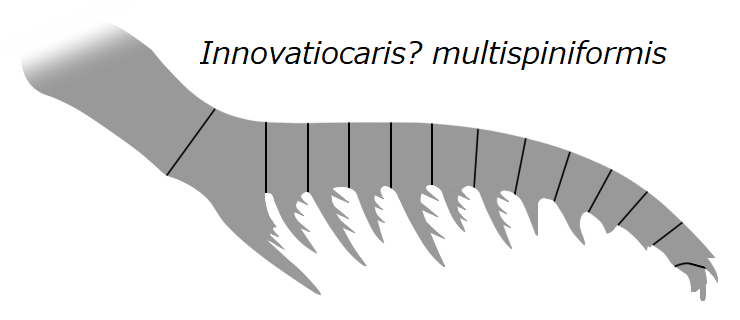
Innovatiocaris? multispiniformis frontal appendage

NIGP 177621, the holotype of Innovatiocaris? multispiniformis, was collected from the same locality as the I. maotianshanensis holotype. It consists of a complete frontal appendage. The appendage of I.? multispiniformis consists of 13 distal articulated podomeres, as opposed to the 11 podomeres found in I. maotianshanensis and I.? sp. This may be a unique feature or the result of incomplete preservation. The specific name, "multispiniformis", is derived from the roots "multi", meaning "multiple", and "spiniformis", meaning "spinous", in reference to the multiple spines on the frontal appendages. A 2023 study argued that it forms a monophyletic clade with I.? sp. but not I. maotianshanensis, based on phylogenetic analyses.

=== Innovatiocaris? sp. ===
An additional specimen, NIGP 177620, was assigned to Innovatiocaris? sp. by Zeng et al. (2022). It consists of a complete frontal appendage, preserved on a part and counterpart. The specimen was collected from the Maotianshan Shale Member of the Yu'anshan Formation in Jianshan, Haikou, Yunnan Province, China. It likely represents a distinct species from I. maotianshanensis. This is further supported by a phylogenetic analysis from a 2023 study which suggested it forms a monophyletic clade with I.? multispiniformis but not I. maotianshanensis.

== Classification ==
Zeng et al. (2022) noted that some of the anatomical characteristics of Inovatiocaris seem to indicate an affinity with the Hurdiidae, though it is otherwise more similar to non-hurdiids than to members of this family. The results of two different phylogenetic analyses by Zeng et al. (2022) are displayed in the cladograms below:

Topology 1: Strict consensus tree

- Radiodonta
  - Hurdiidae
  - - - Innovatiocaris maotianshanensis
      - - Guanshancaris kunmingensis
        - Laminacaris
    - - Radiodont C (Shucaris)
      - - - Anomalocaris canadensis
          - - Anomalocaris aff. canadensis
            - Ramskoeldia platyacantha
            - Tamisiocarididae
        - - Amplectobeluidae

Topology 2: 50% majority-rule consensus tree

- Radiodonta
  - - Guanshancaris kunmingensis
    - Laminacaris
    - 'Anomalocarididae'
    - Tamisiocarididae
    - Amplectobeluidae
    - - Innovatiocaris maotianshanensis
      - Hurdiidae
