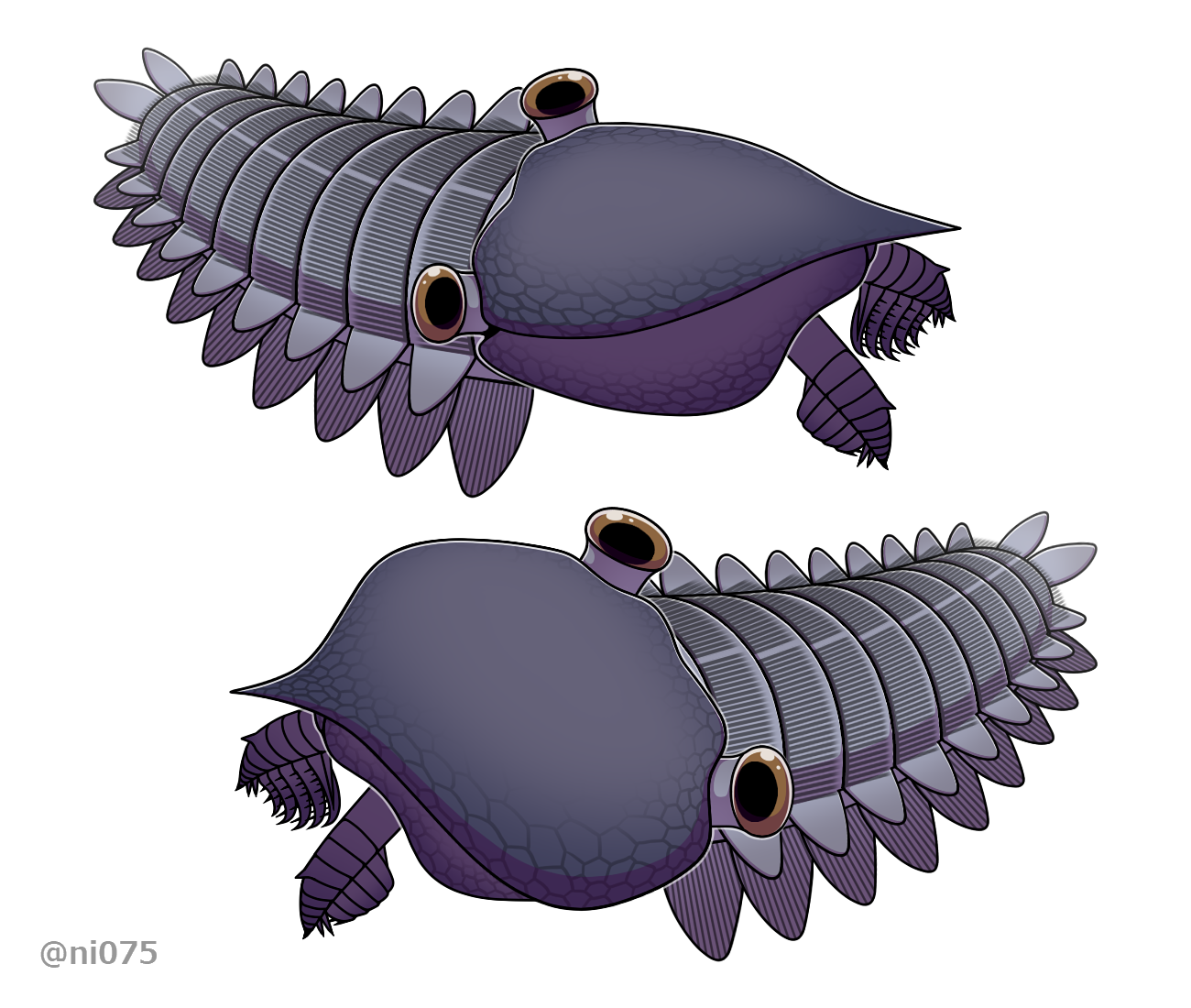
- Reconstruction of H. victoria (top) and H. triangulata
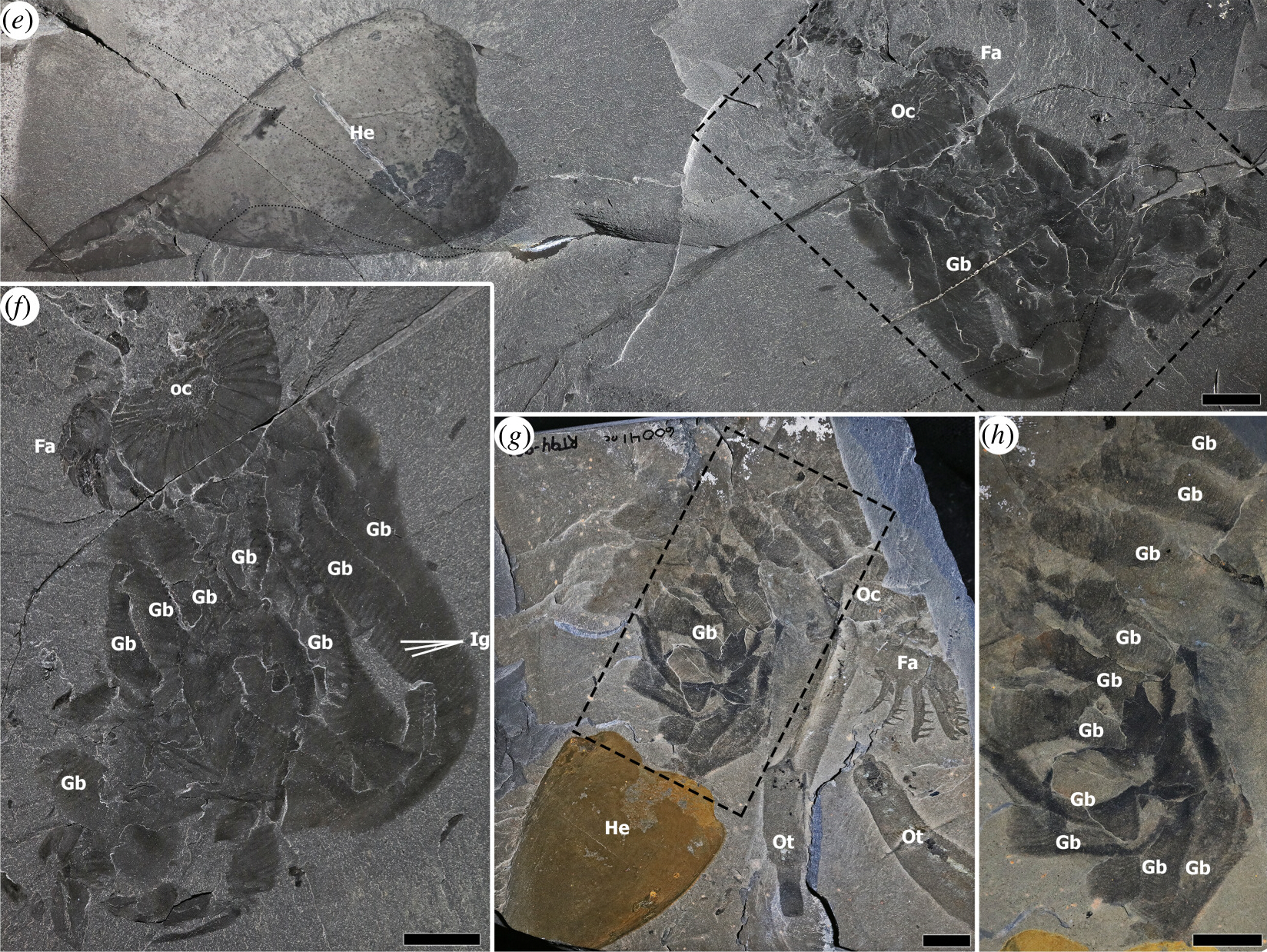
- Disarticulated fossils

Scientific classification
- Kingdom: Animalia
- Stem group: Arthropoda
- Class: †Dinocaridida
- Order: †Radiodonta
- Family: †Hurdiidae
- Subfamily: †Hurdiinae
- Genus: †Hurdia; Walcott, 1912

Type species
- †Hurdia victoria Walcott, 1912

Other species
- †H. triangulata Walcott, 1912; †?H. hospes Chlupach and Kordule, 2002

Synonyms
- Proboscicaris hospes Rolfe, 1962; †?Huangshandongia yichangensis Cui & Huo; †?Liantuoia inflata Cui & Huo, 1990

= Hurdia =

Hurdia Temporal range: Middle Cambrian, 518–505 Ma

Extinct genus of radiodonts

Hurdia is an extinct genus of hurdiid radiodont that lived 505 million years ago during the Cambrian Period. Fossils have been found in North America, China, and the Czech Republic.

== Taxonomic history ==
Hurdia was named in 1912 by Charles Walcott, with two species, the type species H. victoria and a referred species, H. triangulata. The genus name refers to Mount Hurd. It is possible that Walcott had described a specimen the year prior as Amiella, but the specimen is too fragmentary to identify with certainty, so Amiella is a nomen dubium. Walcott's original specimens consisted only of H-elements of the frontal carapace, which he interpreted as being the carapace of an unidentified type of crustacean. P-elements of the carapace were described as a separate genus, Proboscicaris, in 1962.

In 1996, then-curator of the Royal Ontario Museum Desmond H. Collins erected the taxon Radiodonta to encompass Anomalocaris and its close relatives, and included both Hurdia and Proboscicaris in the group. He subsequently recognized that Proboscicaris and Hurdia were based on different parts of the same animal, and recognized that a specimen previously assigned to Peytoia was also a specimen of the species. He presented his ideas in informal articles, and it was not until 2009, after three years of painstaking research, that the complete organism was reconstructed.

Sixty-nine specimens of Hurdia are known from the Greater Phyllopod bed, where they comprise 0.13% of the community.

== Description ==
Hurdia was one of the largest organisms in the Cambrian oceans, H. victoria reached between 18.3–30.5 cm (7.2–12.0 in) in length, while H. triangulata reached up to just 8.1 cm (3.2 in) long. Its head bore a pair of frontal appendages. These frontal appendages had 9 or more rarely 10 or 11 segments/podomeres, which were approximately rectangular and decreased in size towards the end of the appendage. The upper surface of the appendage was convexly curved. Podomeres 2 to 6 bore long downward pointing spines (ventral spines) with forward-curving tips. These ventral spines themselves bore up to 9 equally spaced forward-facing spines dubbed auxiliary spines, with podomeres 7 and 8 bearing shorter, smooth forward curving spines. The frontal appendages were used to bring food to its ring-shaped mouth (oral cone), in which four large plates are present, with inner rows of spines inside the main cone. Like other hurdiids, Hurdia bore a large frontal carapace protruding from its head composed of three sclerites: a central component known as the H-element and two lateral components known as P-elements. Originally, it is estimated that body flaps ran along the sides of the organisms, from which large gills were suspended. However, anatomy of Aegirocassis clarified that Hurdia had both ventral and dorsal flaps, and gills were on trunk segments.

Frontal appendage showcasing range of motion

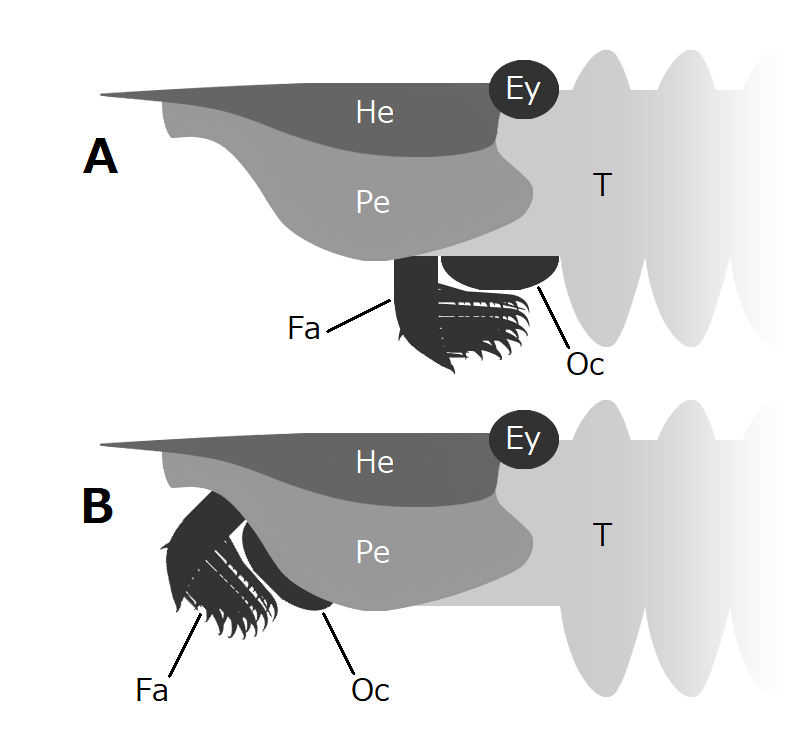
Interpretations of the frontal appendages' and mouthparts' positions; A based on articulated specimens, B based on speculation from Cambroraster

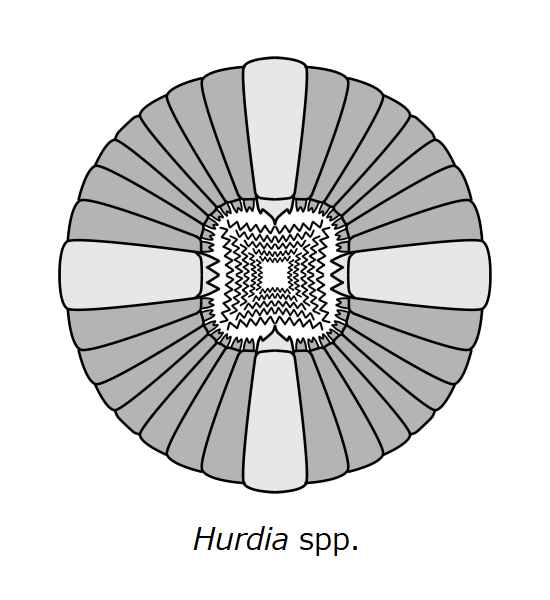
Morphology of the oral cone

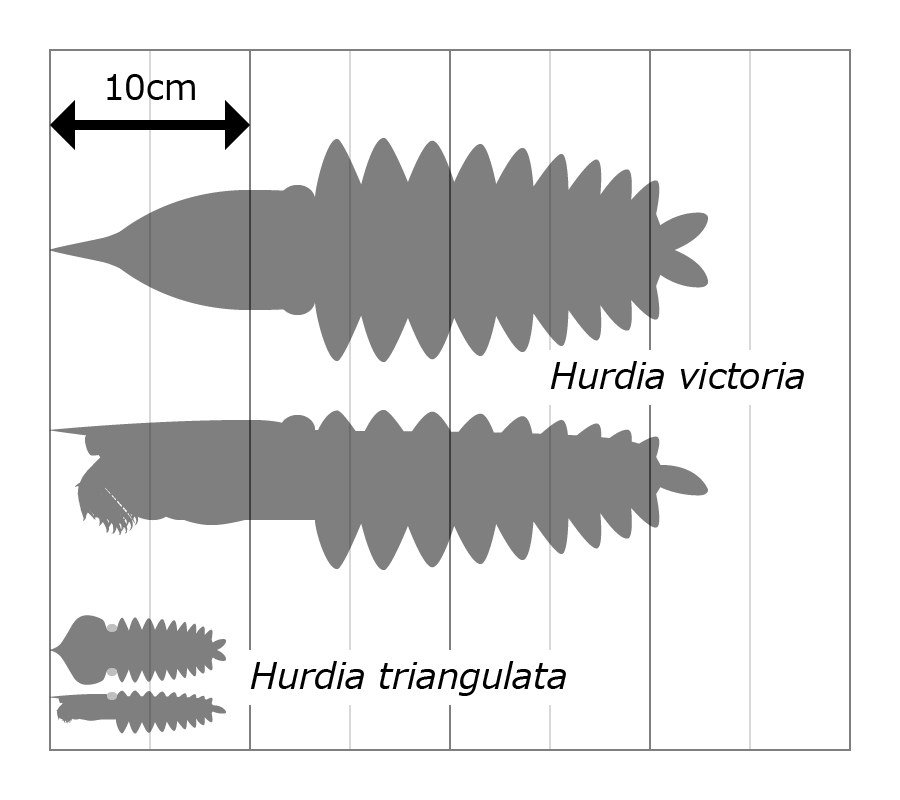
Size comparison of the two species

== Distribution ==
Hurdia had cosmopolitan distribution; two described species has been recovered from the Burgess Shale in British Columbia, Canada. In addition, H. victoria is also known from the Spence Shale in Utah, USA. Unnamed species are known from Qingjiang biota in Hubei, China, Pioche Shale in Nevada, USA, and Wheeler Shale in Utah, USA. Huangshandongia yichangensis and Liantuoia inflata from the Shuijingtuo Formation in Hubei, China, and Proboscicaris hospes from the Jince Formation near the town of Jince, Czech Republic (which is identified as Hurdia hospes in some papers), and unnamed fossil from Ordovician Fezouata Formation could represent species of Hurdia as well.

== Ecology ==
Hurdia is either suggested to have used its frontal appendages to sift small benthic prey (seafloor dwelling) from sediment, or to have used them as a trap to capture larger benthic prey.

== See also ==
- Paleobiota of the Burgess Shale
