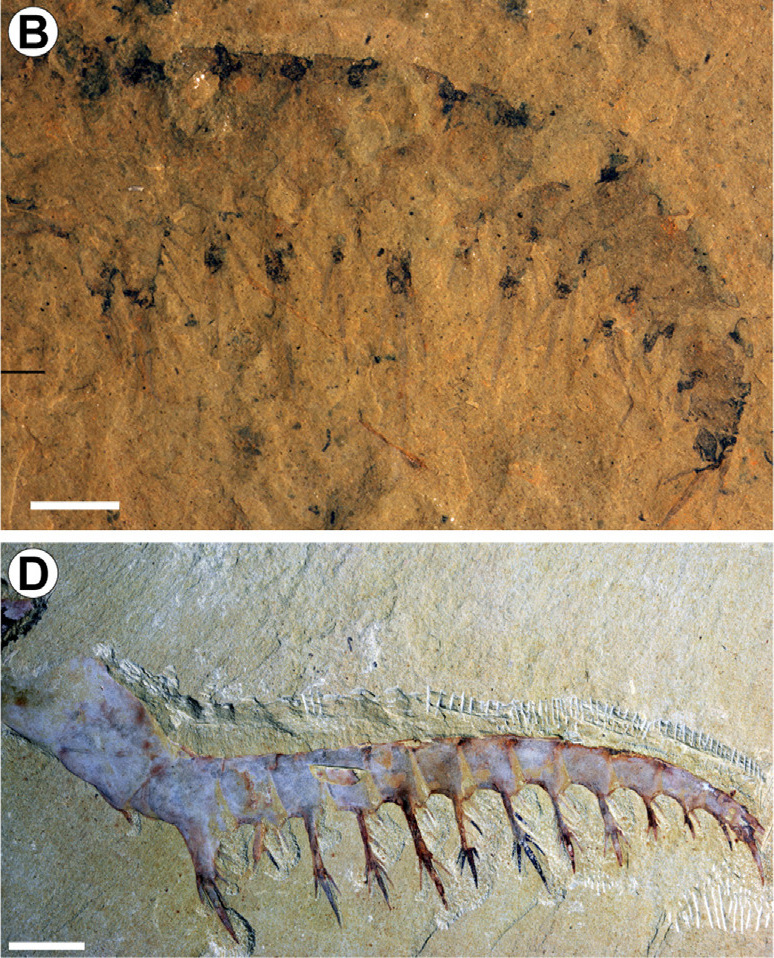
- Fossils of H. magnabasis (B) and H. saron (D)

Scientific classification
- Kingdom: Animalia
- Stem group: Arthropoda
- Class: †Dinocaridida
- Order: †Radiodonta
- Genus: †Houcaris; Wu et al., 2021

Type species
- †Anomalocaris saron Hou, Bergström, & Ahlberg, 1995

Other species
- †H.? magnabasis (Pates, Daley, Edgecombe, Cong, & Lieberman, 2019); †H.? consimilis (Cong et al., 2018)

= Houcaris =

Houcaris Temporal range: Cambrian Series 2

Genus of radiodonts

Houcaris is a possibly paraphyletic radiodont genus, tentatively assigned to either Amplectobeluidae, Anomalocarididae or Tamisiocarididae, known from Cambrian Series 2 of China and the United States. The type species is Houcaris saron which was originally described as a species of the related genus Anomalocaris. Other possible species include H. magnabasis and H. consimilis. The genus Houcaris was established for the two species in 2021 and honors Hou Xian-guang, who had discovered and named the type species Anomalocaris saron in 1995 along with his colleagues Jan Bergström and Per E. Ahlberg.

== Species ==
=== Houcaris saron ===
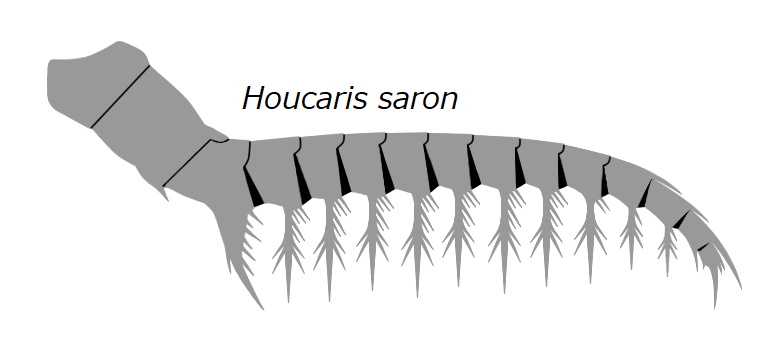
Frontal appendage of H. saron

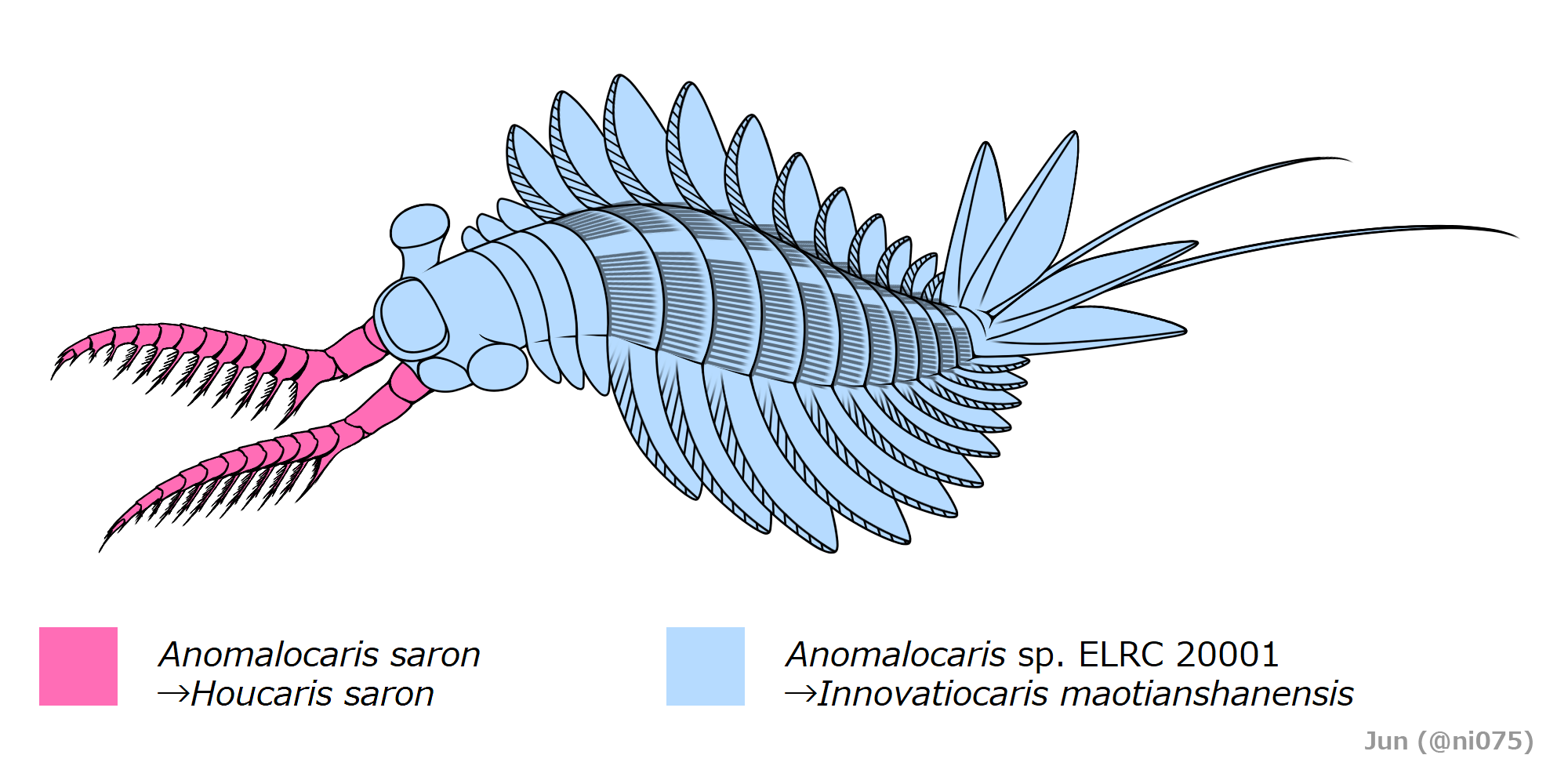
Outdated, chimeric reconstruction based on frontal appendage of H. saron and body of Innovatiocaris that was previously considered as whole body fossil of H. saron

H. saron, known from Maotianshan Shale in Yunnan, is first described in 1995 as Anomalocaris saron. This species is only known from frontal appendages. There is a specimen (ELRC 20001) that is previously considered as whole body fossil of this species, but later study shows that this specimen is not belonging to this species, and later given own genus Innovatiocaris. Length of frontal appendage is up to at least 12 cm. Sometimes considered to belong to family Anomalocarididae or Amplectobeluidae.

=== Houcaris? magnabasis ===
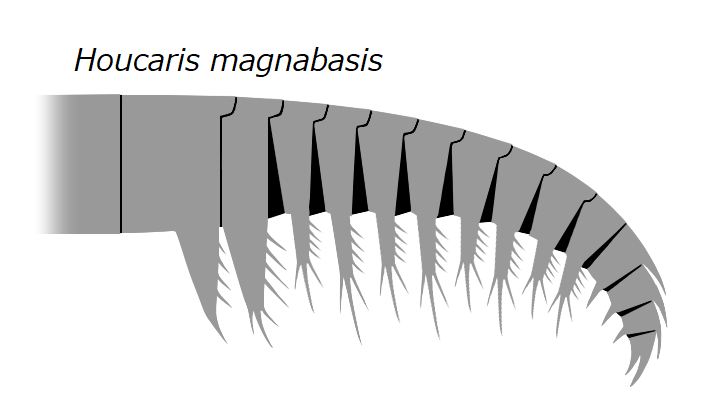
Frontal appendage of H. magnabasis

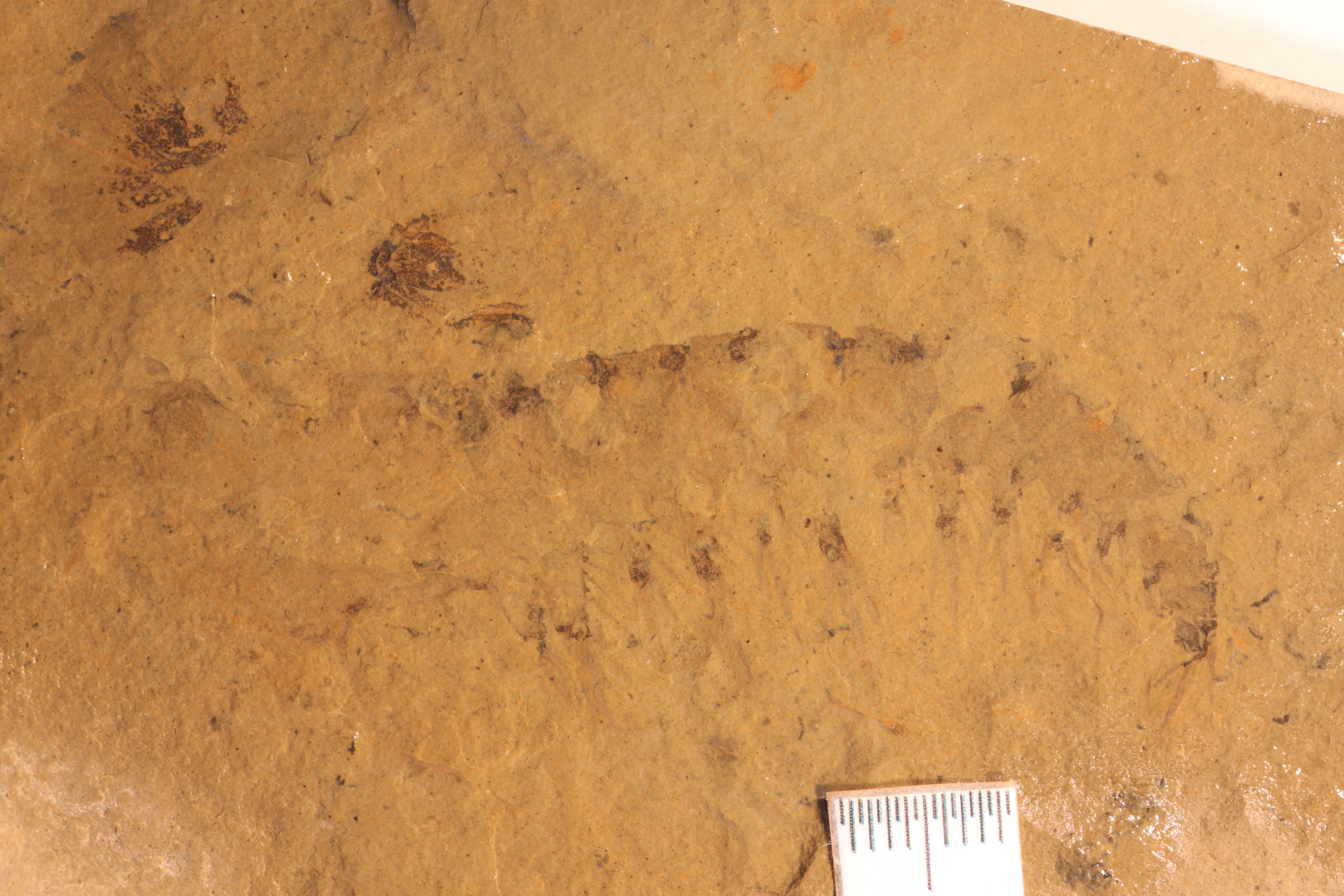
Fossils of H. magnabasis including a frontal appendage and a partial oral cone (upper left corner)

H.? magnabasis, known from Pioche Shale and Pyramid shale in Nevada, is originally described as Anomalocaris cf. saron in 2003, and later named as Anomalocaris magnabasis in 2019. This species is only known from frontal appendages and some partial fossils of oral cone (mouthpart) and flaps. Largest estimated length of frontal appendage is 17.5 cm. Sometimes considered to belong to family Anomalocarididae or Amplectobeluidae.

However, results from the phylogenetic analysis by McCall in 2023 suggest that H.? magnabasis does not form a monophyletic clade with other species of Houcaris, and that it is a sister taxon of the Amplectobeluidae. Thus, he tentatively referred to the species as Anomalocaris magnabasis, even though the results show that it also does not form a clade with known species of Anomalocaris.

=== Houcaris? consimilis ===
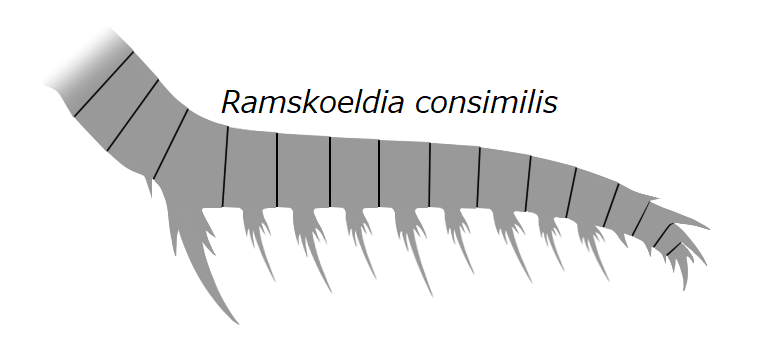
H.? consimilis

H.? consimilis is known from the Maotianshan Shales of South China and possibly the Latham Shale of California. While this species was originally described within Ramskoeldia and a sister taxon of its type species (R. platyacantha), subsequent studies have rejected their monophyly. In 2022, this species was recovered as a basal member of the Tamisiocarididae close to H. saron by the describers of Innovatiocaris, and not monophyletic with R. platyacantha. In 2023, on the basis of phylogenetic analysis and morphological comparison, McCall suggested that it does not form a monophyletic clade with R. platyacantha, but instead with H. saron, so he included this species within the genus as Houcaris consimilis. His results also consistently recover both species as a member of the Amplectobeluidae. Based on their phylogenetic analysis from the 2024 study describing Shucaris and the first-known oral cone of H? consimilis, Wu and colleagues recovered H? consimilis as an amplectobeluid, but not as a sister taxon of R. platyacantha, and rejected the tamisiocaridid affinity.
