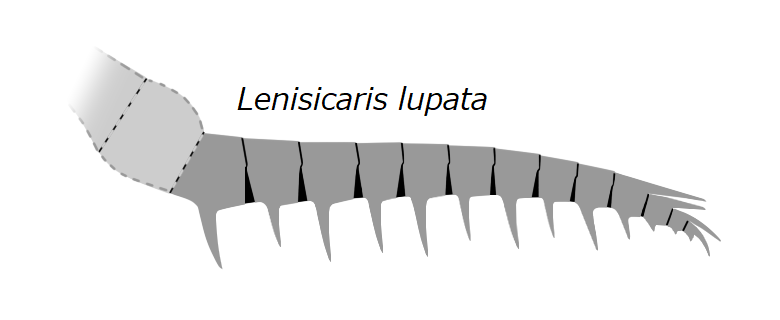
- A reconstruction of L. lupata's frontal appendage
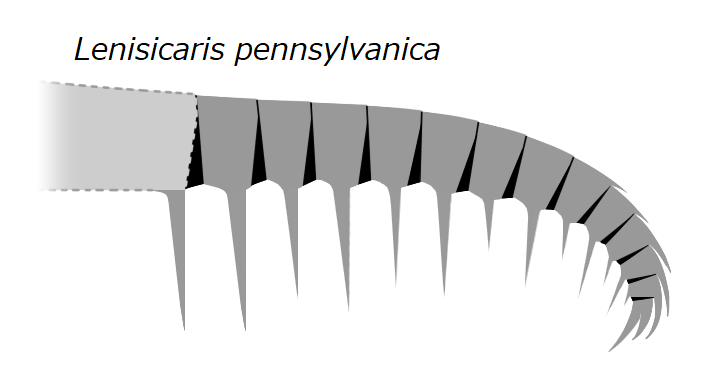
- Reconstruction of the frontal appendage of L. pennsylvanica

Scientific classification
- Kingdom: Animalia
- Phylum: Arthropoda
- Class: †Dinocaridida
- Order: †Radiodonta
- Family: †Anomalocarididae
- Genus: †Lenisicaris; Wu et al, 2021

Type species
- †Lenisicaris lupata Wu et al., 2021

Other species
- †L. pennsylvanica (Resser, 1929)

Synonyms
- Anomalocaris pennsylvanica (Resser, 1929)

= Lenisicaris =

Lenisicaris Temporal range: Cambrian Stage 3 to Cambrian Stage 4 521–509 Ma

Extinct genus of Cambrian radiodont

Lenisicaris, from Latin lēnis, meaning "smooth", and Ancient Greek καρίς (karís), meaning "shrimp", is an extinct Cambrian anomalocaridid radiodont, known from the Maotianshan Shales of China and the Kinzers Formation of Pennsylvania.

== Discovery and naming ==
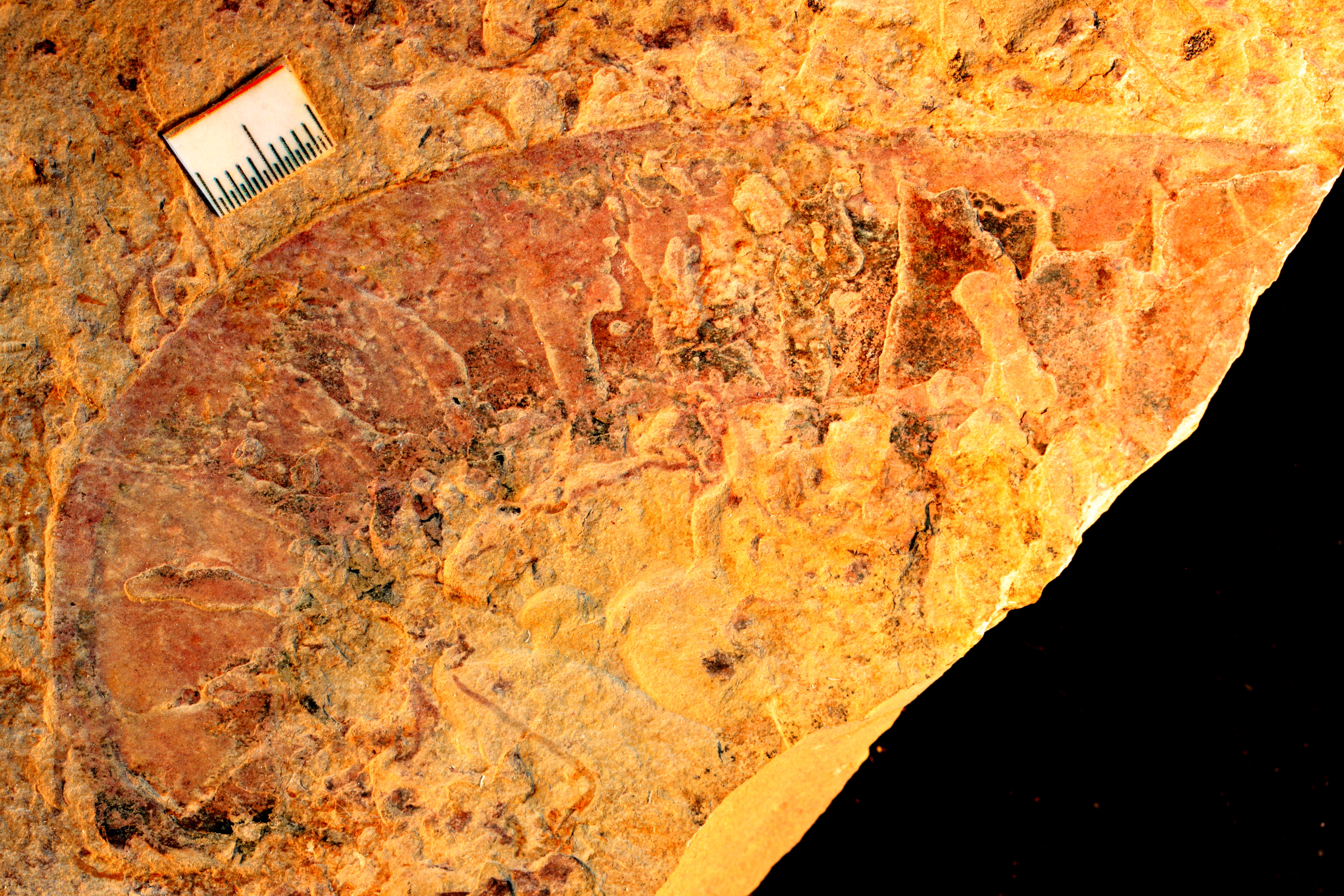
L. pennsylvanica appendage

In 1929, American paleontologist Charles E. Resser described a poorly preserved arthropod fossil from the Kinzers Formation. He thought this specimen represented a new species of Anomalocaris, so it was classified as Anomalocaris pennsylvanica, which makes it the second radiodont species ever described. Numerous specimens have later been referred to this species, but the majority of them were subsequently assigned to different taxa of radiodonts. Only three specimens are now confidently included within this species.

L. pennsylvanica was long thought to be a species of Anomalocaris, until a 2021 study assigned it to the genus Lenisicaris on the basis of frontal appendage morphology similar to that of the type species, L. lupata. The specific name lupata derives from the combination of the word "lupus" and "fanga", meaning large sharp wolf tooth, based on the shape of the endites resembling wolf fangs.

== Description ==
Lenisicaris is only known from frontal appendages, though these specimens have several distinguishing traits, most noticeably the lack of auxiliary spines. The type species L. lupata has smaller, triangular endites, closely resembling those of Anomalocaris. The other species L. pennsylvanica (formerly described as a species of Anomalocaris) has larger and more rectangular endites, with those on odd-numbered podomeres being smaller.
