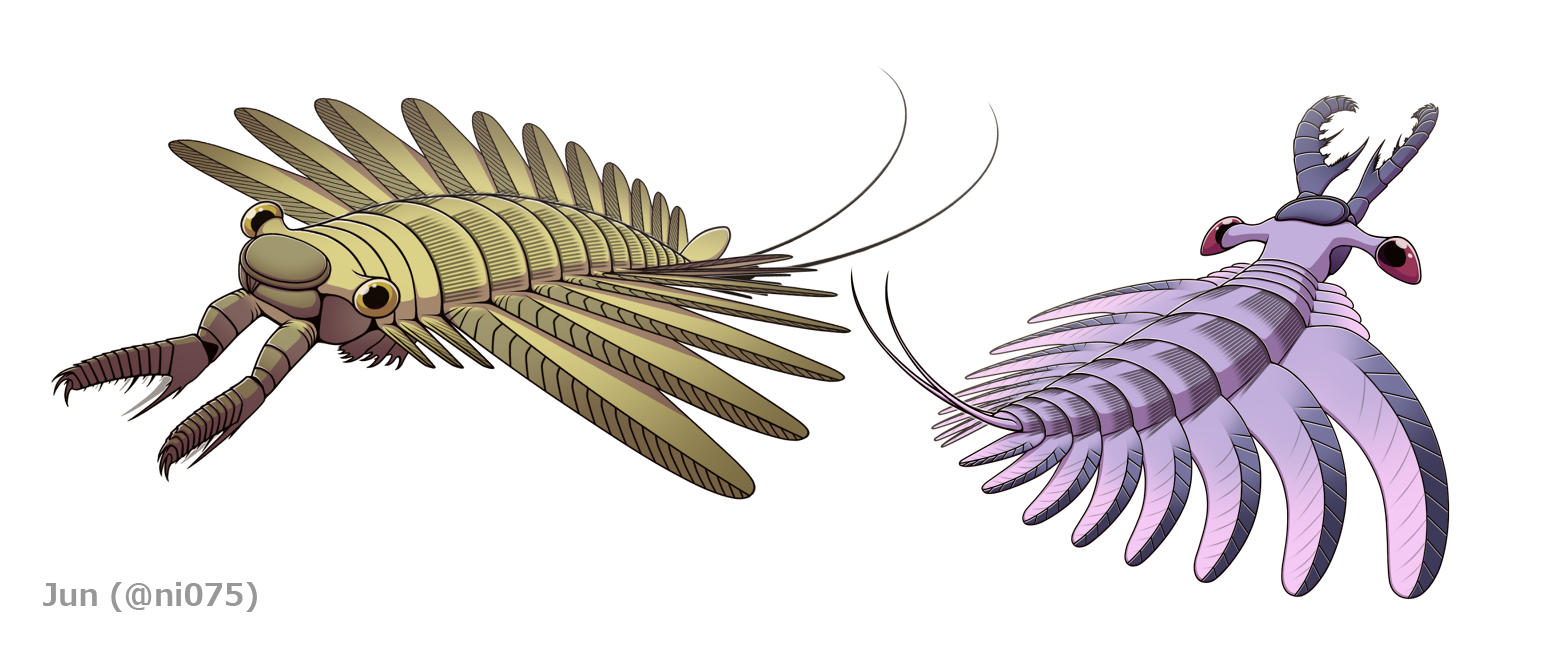
- Amplectobelua (left) and Lyrarapax (right)

Scientific classification
- Kingdom: Animalia
- Stem group: Arthropoda
- Class: †Dinocaridida
- Order: †Radiodonta
- Family: †Amplectobeluidae; Pates et al., 2019

Genera
- †Amplectobelua; †Guanshancaris; †Houcaris?; †Lyrarapax; †Ramskoeldia; †Shucaris?

= Amplectobeluidae =

Extinct family of Cambrian arthropods

Amplectobeluidae is a clade of Cambrian radiodonts. It currently includes five definitive genera, Amplectobelua, Lyrarapax, Ramskoeldia, Guanshancaris and a currently unnamed genus from the lower Cambrian aged Sirius Passet site in Greenland. There is also a potential sixth genus, Houcaris, but that genus has become problematic in terms of its taxonomic placement.

== Definition ==
In 2014, Amplectobeluidae was defined as the most inclusive clade including Amplectobelua symbrachiata but not Anomalocaris canadensis, Tamisiocaris borealis, or Hurdia victoria.

== Description ==
Amplectobeluids have frontal appendages with a well-developed first distal endite, which forms a pincer-like structure suited for grasping. Complete body fossils of amplectobeluids are only known for Amplectobelua and Lyrarapax, both showing a combination of characters resembling those of Anomalocaris; a streamlined body, a small head with ovoid sclerites, well-developed swimming flaps, and a pair of caudal furcae. Amplectobelua and Ramskoeldia have a pair of gnathobase-like structures,, while Lyrarapax and Guanshancaris have an oral cone with a tetraradial arrangement and scale-like nodes.

== Classification ==
Early in 2014, "Anomalocaris" kunmingensis was tentatively assigned to Amplectobelua by Vinther et al. Later that year, however, the discoverers of Lyrarapax unguispinus ignored that assessment and created a genus within Amplectobelua sensu Vinther et al. An indeterminate frontal appendage assignable to this group is known from the Parker Slate of Vermont.

== Phylogeny ==
An a posteriori-weighted phylogenetic analysis in 2014 found the following relationships within the Amplectobeluidae:

- - NIGP 154565
  - "Anomalocaris" saron
- - "Anomalocaris" kunmingensis
  - - Lyrarapax unguispinus
    - - Amplectobelua symbrachiata
      - Amplectobelua stephenensis
