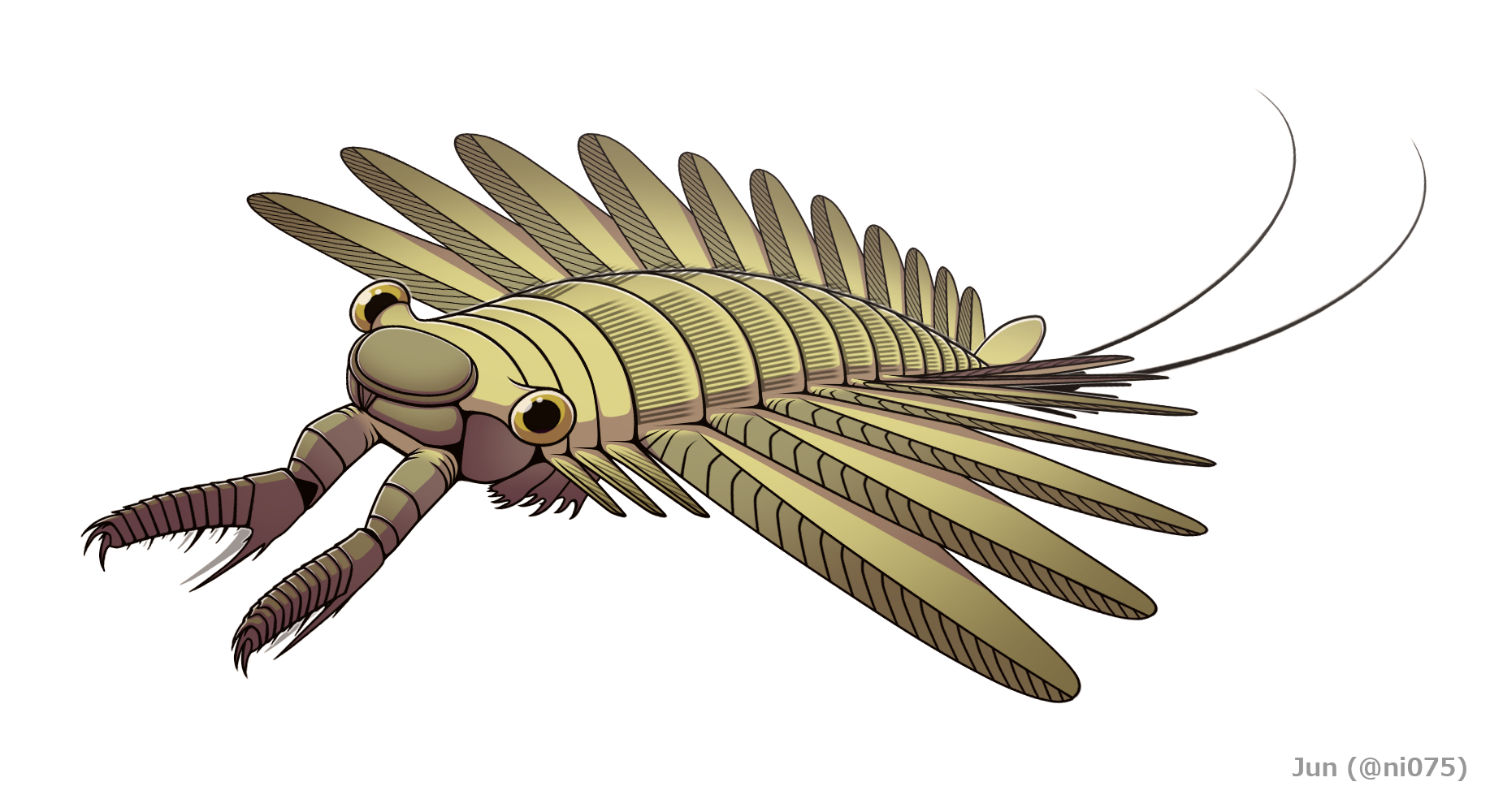
- Reconstruction of Amplectobelua symbrachiata
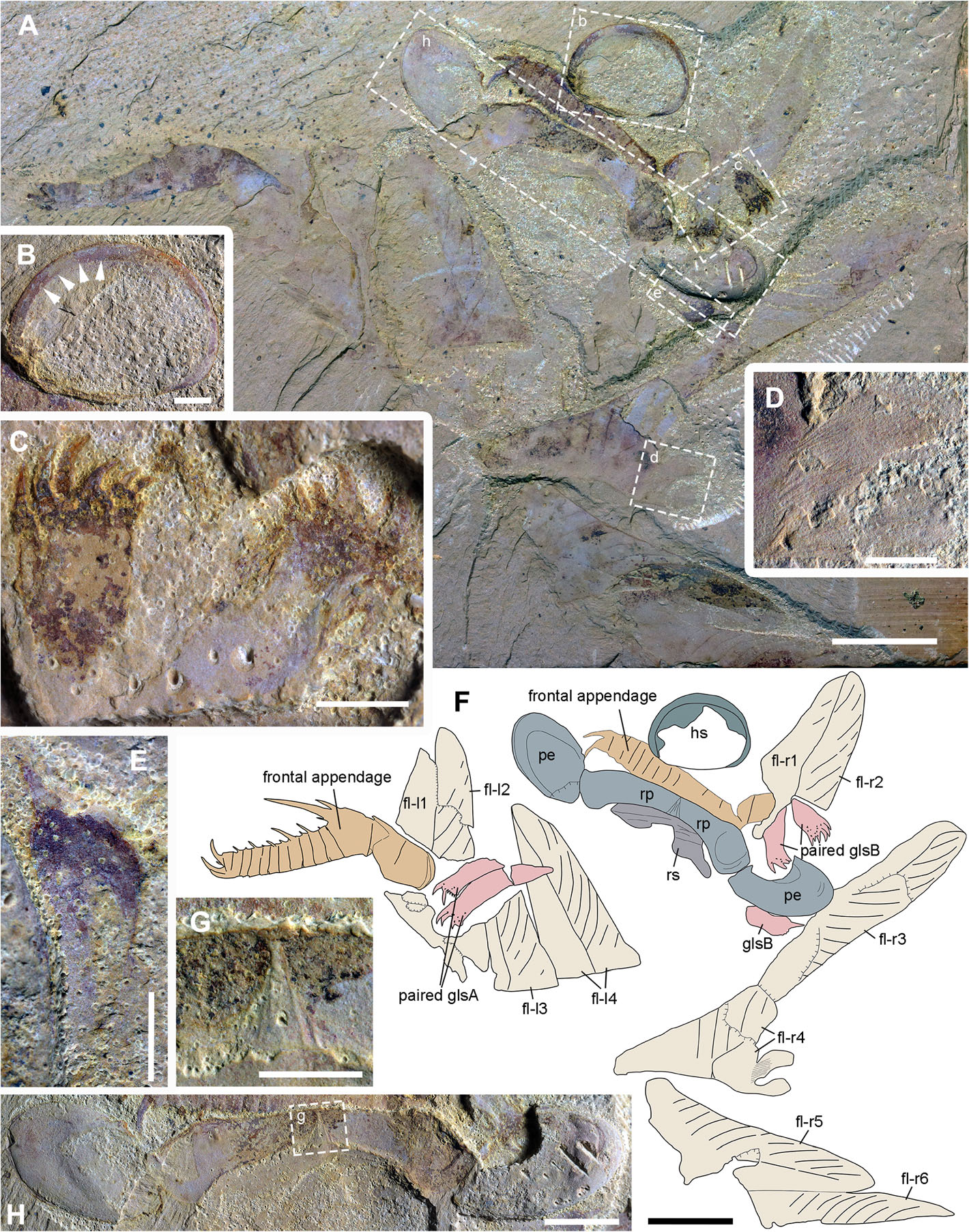
- Fossil specimen, showing frontal appendages, head carapace, gnathobase-like structures and body flaps

Scientific classification
- Kingdom: Animalia
- Stem group: Arthropoda
- Class: †Dinocaridida
- Order: †Radiodonta
- Family: †Amplectobeluidae
- Genus: †Amplectobelua; Hou, Bergström & Ahlberg, 1995

Type species
- †Amplectobelua symbrachiata Hou, Bergström & Ahlberg, 1995

Other species
- †A. stephenensis Daley & Budd, 2010

= Amplectobelua =

Amplectobelua Temporal range: Cambrian Stage 3-Miaolingian 518–505 Ma

Extinct genus of radiodont

Amplectobelua (meaning "embracing beast") is an extinct genus of late Early Cambrian amplectobeluid radiodont, a group of stem arthropods that mostly lived as free-swimming predators during the first half of the Paleozoic Era.

== Anatomy ==
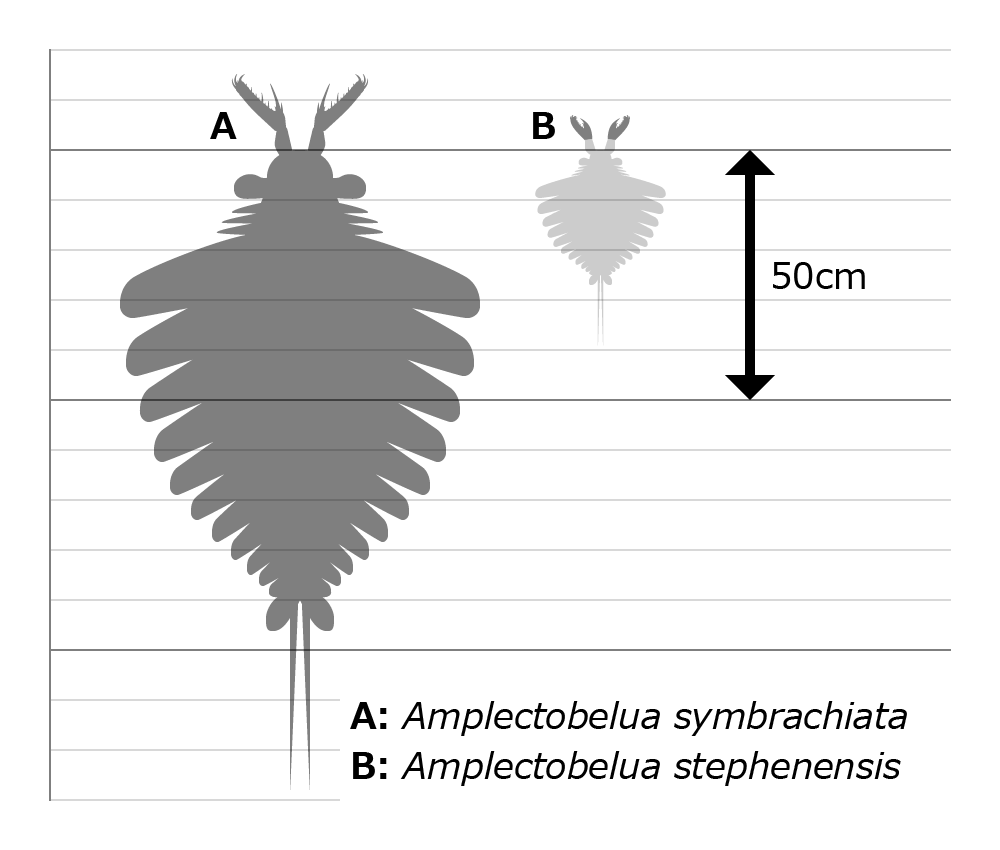
Size comparison of two species

Size of both Amplectobelua species and Anomalocaris canadensis compared to a human

Amplectobelua was a giant radiodont, with the largest specimen of A. symbrachiata reaching up to 90 cm (3.0 ft) in body length excluding the frontal appendages and tail. A. stephenensis is much smaller although its total size is uncertain due to scant remains. The body structures other than frontal appendages are only known from the type species Amplectobelua symbrachiata. Like other radiodonts, Amplectobelua had a pair of jointed frontal appendages, a head covered by dorsal and lateral sclerites (the latter had been misinterpreted as huge eyes), a limbless body with dorsal gills (setal blades), and a series of flaps on both sides that extended along the length of its body.

Amplectobelua had a specialized frontal appendage, in which it has a distinct 3-segmented shaft region and 12-segmented distal articulated region, and the spine on the fourth segment (first segment of distal articulated region) hooked forward to oppose the tip of the appendage, allowing it to grasp prey like a pincer. Amplectobelua had 11 pairs of body flaps in total, they are relatively elongated and straight in outline. The size of the flaps decrease posteriory, and each of their frontal margin have rows of vein-like structures (strengthening rays). The neck region have at least 3 pairs of slender, reduced anterior flaps. The trunk terminated with a pair of long furcae (streamers).

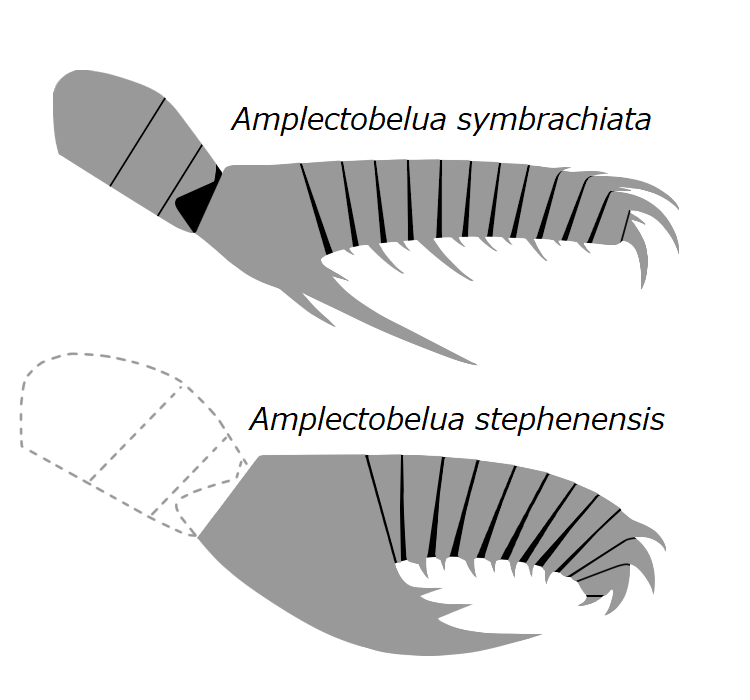
Frontal appendages of A. symbrachiata and A. stephenensis. Note the shaft region of A. stephenensis is unknown.

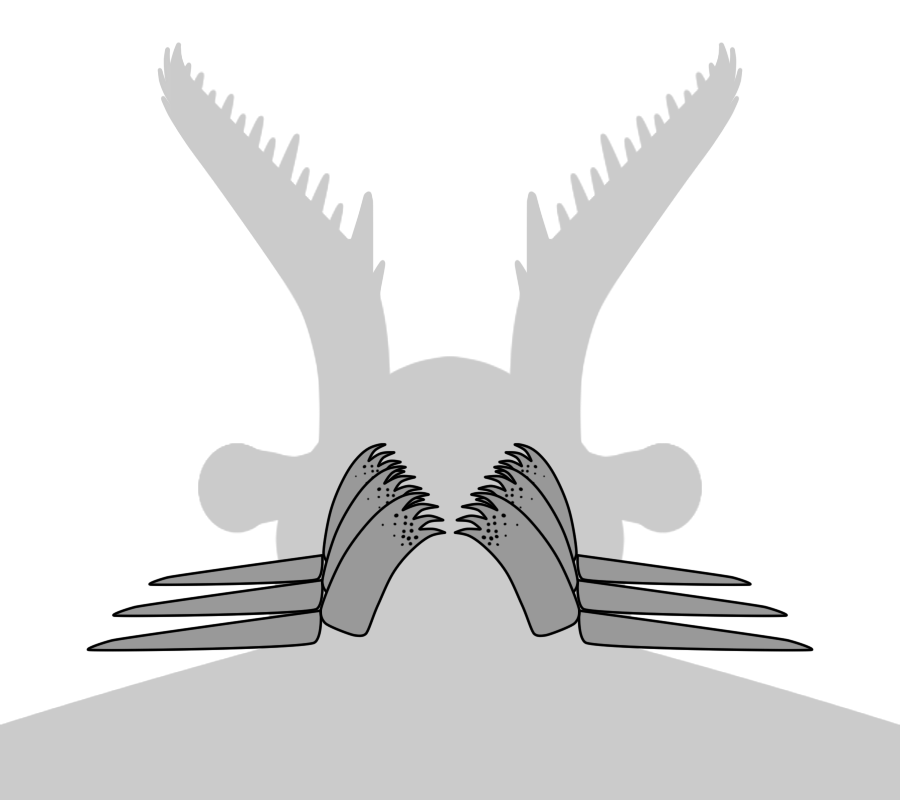
Ventral view of a generalized GLS-bearing radiodont, showing 3 pairs of gnathobase-like structures (GLSs) and corresponded anterior flaps.

Amplectobelua shares a unique feature among radiodonts with Ramskoeldia, in having gnathobase-like structures (GLSs) underneath its neck region, at least 6, up to eight. They functioned like the gnathobases of arthropods, being able to rotate and move to shred prey. They were connected to reduced anterior flaps. Additionally, the mouth (oral cone) of Amplectobelua were interpreted as different from typical radiodont, lacking the typical Peytoia-style oral cone and possessing numerous flat tooth-plates with unclear, but possibly non-radial arrangement.

== Species ==
Two species are known, Amplectobelua symbrachiata from the Chengjiang biota and Amplectobelua stephenensis from the later Burgess Shale. A. symbrachiata is known from complete specimens, while A. stephenensis is known only from isolated frontal appendages, both species are known form the Kinzers formation. A. stephenensis is more advanced, with the frontal appendages being more specialized for grasping: the fourth spine is larger and the spines on outer segments are reduced. A. symbrachiata is previously named as a species of Anomalocaris, Anomalocaris trispinata in 1992, before description of A. symbrachiata. Some studies considered that name Amplectobelua trispinata should be used instead of A. symbrachiata.

== Ecology ==
The movement of the frontal appendages of A. stephenensis

Amplectobelua was likely a nektonic predator. Its frontal appendages were worked like pincers to pinch prey. Its structure was suitable to firmly grasp and manipulate prey to the mouth or tearing off pieces from large carcasses. Gnathobase-like structures were probably used to chew prey. Research of 432 specimens resulted that it would be an extremely fast-growing animal for an arthropod.

== See also ==
- List of Chengjiang Biota species by phylum
- Paleobiota of the Burgess Shale
