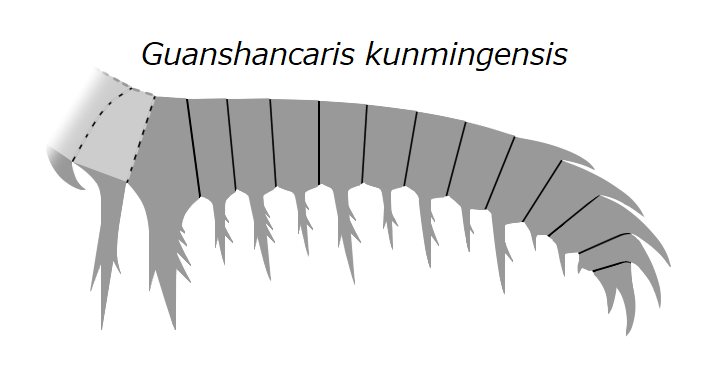
- Frontal appendage of Guanshancaris
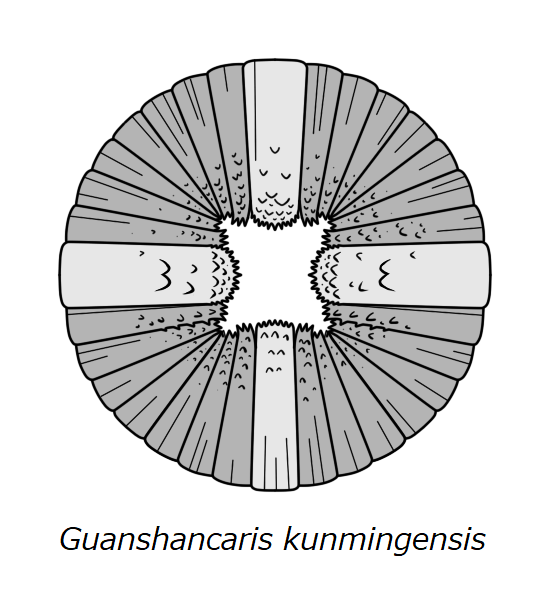
- Oral cone of Guanshancaris

Scientific classification
- Kingdom: Animalia
- Stem group: Arthropoda
- Class: †Dinocaridida
- Order: †Radiodonta
- Family: †Amplectobeluidae
- Genus: †Guanshancaris; Zhang et al., 2023
- Species: †G. kunmingensis

Binomial name
- †Guanshancaris kunmingensis (Wang et al., 2013)

Synonyms
- Anomalocaris kunmingensis (Wang et al., 2013)

= Guanshancaris =

Guanshancaris Temporal range: Cambrian Stage 4

Extinct genus of Amplectobeluid radiodont

Guanshancaris is an extinct genus of amplectobeluid radiodont known from the Cambrian Stage 4 Guanshan Biota of southern China. It is only known from a single species. G. kunmingensis which was described in 2013 as a species of Anomalocaris before being placed in a new genus in 2023. Like many other radiodonts, it is only known from fragmentary remains, including its frontal appendages and the oral cone. It has been suggested to have been durophagous. Based on the proportions of Anomalocaris, it is estimated to have been 22.2–32.8 cm (8.7–12.9 in) long.
