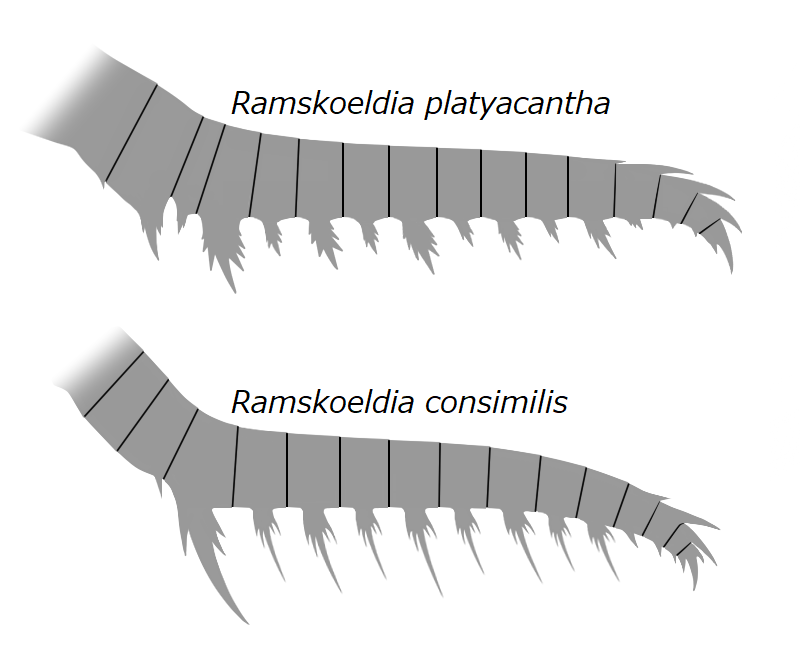
- Frontal appendages of R. platyacantha and R. consimilis

Scientific classification
- Kingdom: Animalia
- Stem group: Arthropoda
- Class: †Dinocaridida
- Order: †Radiodonta
- Family: †Amplectobeluidae
- Genus: †Ramskoeldia; Cong et al., 2018

Type species
- Ramskoeldia platyacantha Cong et al., 2018

Species
- †R. platyacantha (Cong et al., 2018); †R.? consimilis Cong et al., 2018

= Ramskoeldia =

Ramskoeldia Temporal range: Chengjiang–Middle Cambrian

Extinct genus of Amplectobeluid radiodont

Ramskoeldia is a genus of amplectobeluid radiodont described in 2018. It was the second genus of radiodont found to possess gnathobase-like structures (abbreviated as GLS) and an atypical oral cone after Amplectobelua. The type species, Ramskoeldia platyacantha, was discovered in the Chengjiang biota of China, the home of numerous radiodonts such as Amplectobelua and Lyrarapax.

== Morphology ==
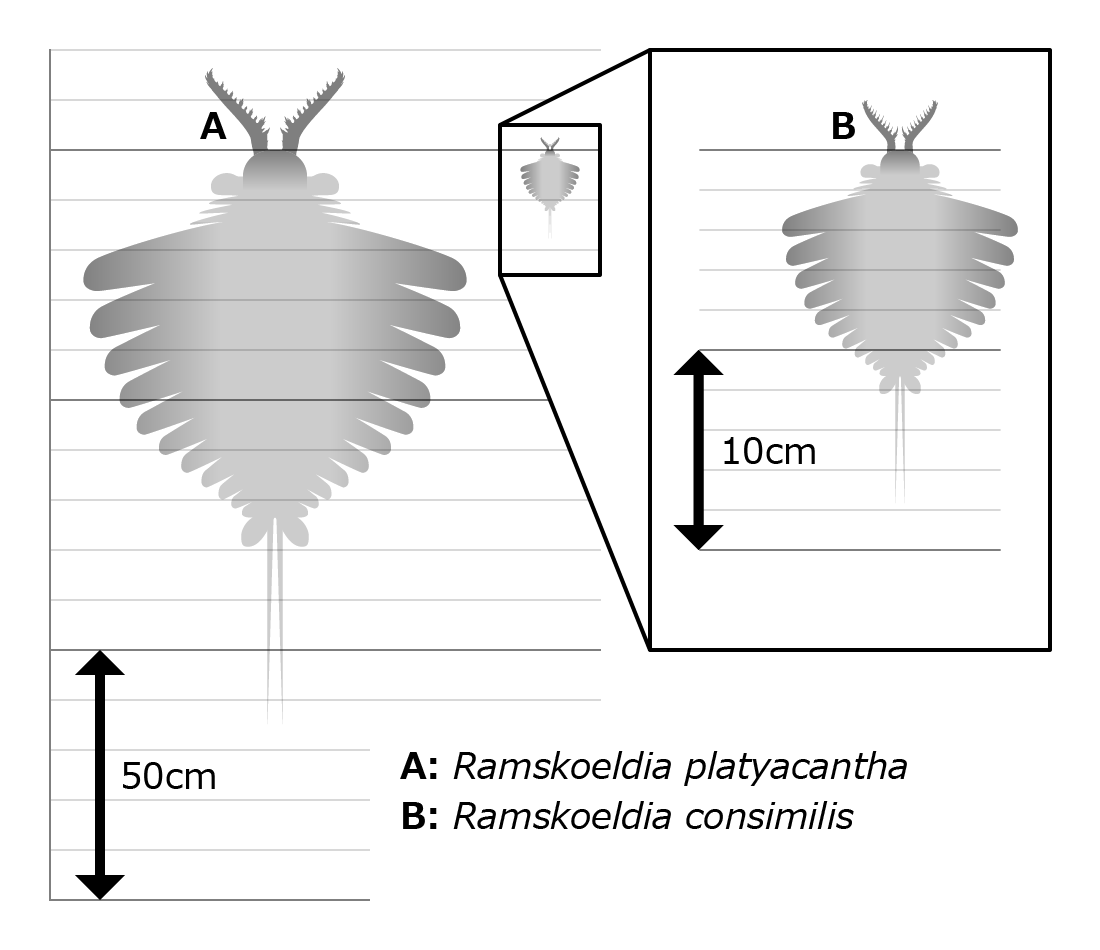
Ramskoeldia size diagram

Ramskoeldia is known only from a few frontal appendages, gnathobase-like structures (GLSs), disarticulated smooth and tuberculated plates interpreted as parts of their oral cones, as well as fragments of body flaps and head carapace complex. The frontal appendage of Ramskoeldia is composed of 16 podomeres (3 shaft podomeres and 13 distal articulated region podomeres), with endites of podomeres 4 to at least podomere 12 bearing prominent auxiliary spines. The endites of podomere 4 (first podomere of distal articulated region) is the largest compared to other endites, but not extremely enlarged like those of Amplectobelua. The size of the endites alternates (those on even podomeres being larger than that of the odd podomere following it) and decreasing distally, except podomere 8 is larger than podomere 6 just like Amplectobelua. Compared to Amplectobelua, the GLSs of Ramskoeldia are wider and the three pairs of GLSs did not gradually alternate in size.

== Taxonomy ==
Two species of Ramskoeldia have been described, R. platyacantha and R.? consimilis, but the taxonomic placement of latter species within this genus has been consistently questioned by subsequent studies. The endites of R. platyacantha are stout and their length does not exceed the height of the podomere to which they attach. The shaft podomeres 2 and 3 of R. platyacantha also bore prominent endites resembling those of distal articulated podomeres. Conversely, in R. consimilis, the endites of the distal articulated region are slender and most of them have a length that exceeds the height of podomere to which they attach. The shaft of R. consimilis has only a simple endite on podomere 3. The frontal appendages of R. consimilis had been previously misidentified as Houcaris saron owing to their similar overall appearance.

Due to the numerous shared characters with Amplectobelua (e.g. larger endites of podomere 8; irregular oral cone; presence of GLSs), the discovery of Ramskoeldia questioned the amplectobeluid affinity of Lyrarapax, a presumed amplectobeliud genus which lacking characters noted above. Ramskoeldia classified under Amplectobeluidae based on the diagnosis by Cong et al. 2018, while further phylogenetic analysis either suggest it to be a member of Amplectobeluidae (alongside Amplectobelua, Lyrarapax, and Laminacaris) or a relatively basal radiodont.
