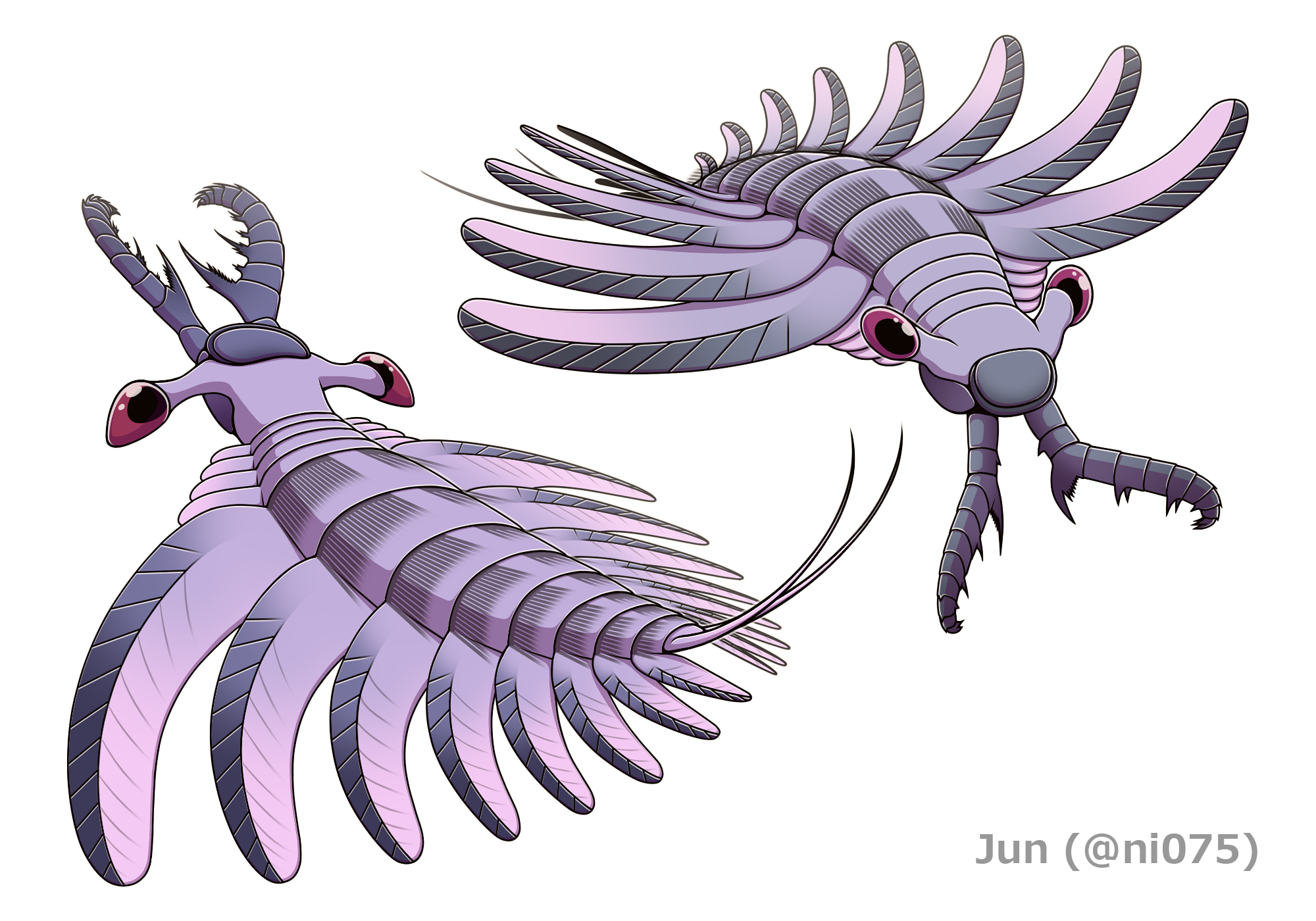

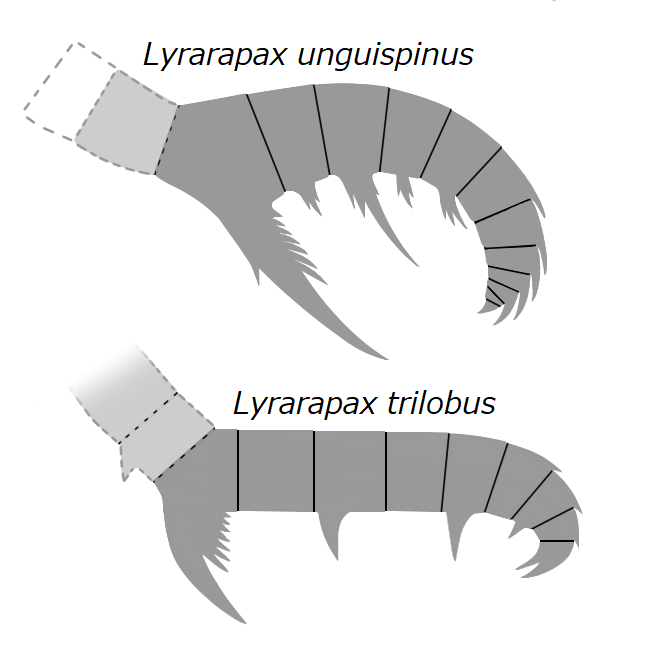
- Comparison of the frontal appendages of the two species

Scientific classification
- Kingdom: Animalia
- Stem group: Arthropoda
- Class: †Dinocaridida
- Order: †Radiodonta
- Family: †Amplectobeluidae
- Genus: †Lyrarapax; Cong et al., 2014

Type species
- Lyrarapax unguispinus Cong et al., 2014

Species
- L. unguispinus Cong et al., 2014; L. trilobus Cong et al., 2016

= Lyrarapax =

Lyrarapax Temporal range: Cambrian Stage 3

Extinct genus of Amplectobeluid radiodont

Lyrarapax is a radiodont genus of the family Amplectobeluidae that lived in the early Cambrian period 518 million years ago. Its fossils were found in the Maotianshan Shales of China. The first species, Lyrarapax unguispinus was described in 2014, with a second species, Lyrarapax trilobus being described in 2016, differing principally in the morphology of its frontal appendages.

== Description ==
L. unguispinus is roughly 8 cm (3.1 in) long. Its frontal appendages are short with a large first endite bearing several spines and alternating endites thereafter. The neck is prominent with four segments. The first flap pair is hypertrophied and paddle-shaped, with the following pairs decreasing sharply in size and a tail fan composed of three blade-like flap pairs. Remarkably, the nervous system of L. unguispinus is preserved in detail, showing that radiodont frontal appendages are protocerebral like the antennae of velvet worms, showing the two structures derive from the same source. In addition, as the labrum also seems to be protocerebral, it also likely derives from the same structures, providing a possible answer to the arthropod head problem.

L. trilobus is quite similar, although somewhat smaller, with its H-element having a rimmed margin. The frontal appendages are quite different, with the very presence of endites being alternating (the third and fifth non-shaft podomeres lack them altogether) and the second endite being especially large. Contrary to its initial description reporting an unusual wrinkled structure around the mouth, Lyrarapax possessed a typical radiodontan oral cone, a radial mouth with four large plates and smaller, thinner plates between them. The first flap in this species is not much wider than the rest, unlike in L. unguispinus, alongside the flaps having transverse lines interpreted as strengthening rays, another trait unique to this species. The trunk is divided into three lobes (giving this species its name) by prominent furrows, with the central region being more raised than the lateral ones.

== Etymology ==
The scientific name "Lyrarapax" is a compound word of the Latin "lyra" (lyre) and "rapax" (predator), and is named after the outline of the body of this genus, which resembles a stringed instrument called a lyre, as well as its presumed predatory lifestyle. The species name unguispinus derives from the spiny, claw-like frontal appendages, while trilobus derives from the three-lobed trunk.

== See also ==
- Paleobiota of the Maotianshan Shales
