= Acanthopahvantia =

Acanthopahvantia Temporal range: Drumian

Scientific classification
- Kingdom: Animalia
- Stem group: Arthropoda
- Class: †Dinocaridida
- Order: †Radiodonta
- Family: †Hurdiidae
- Subfamily: †Hurdiinae
- Genus: †Acanthopahvantia; Lerosey-Aubril & Ortega-Hernández, 2026
- Species: †A. boardmani

Binomial name
- †Acanthopahvantia boardmani Lerosey-Aubril & Ortega-Hernández, 2026

Acanthopahvantia is an extinct genus of hurdiid radiodont from the Drumian of the Wheeler Shale (Utah) that contains one species, Acanthopahvantia boardmani. Known only from a singular central carapace element, Acanthopahvantia bears a loose resemblance to another genus of radiodont, Pahvantia, but differs in that its carapace is remarkably spinose, with a prominent anterior sagittal spine and lateral extensions.

== Discovery and naming ==
Acanthopahvantia is known from one specimen, MCZ.IP.206009, discovered in the U-Dig quarry of the Wheeler Shale, located in Utah's House Range. The fossil, consisting of a central carapace element, is dated to the Drumian stage of the Cambrian.

The generic name combines the Greek Akantha, meaning "spine" or "thorn", with the name of another genus of radiodont, Pahvantia. The name was chosen to highlight the general morphological similarity between the two genera and the distinctive spines on Acanthopahvantia's carapace. The specific name is in honor of William E. Boardman for discovering the only known specimen.

== Description ==
Photographs (A_{1}, A_{2}, A_{4}) and interpretive drawing (A_{3}) of Acanthopahvantia fossil, with Pahvantia (B, C) and Cordaticaris (D) for comparison.

Acanthopahvantia is only known from the central element of its carapace, which has preserved dimensions of 63 mm (roughly 2.48 in) in length and up to 34 mm (roughly 1.34 in) in width, including the lateral extensions.

Acanthopahvantia's carapace is notably elongate in nature. The anterior end bears a very large anterior sagittal spine which comprises roughly one fourth of the fossil's length, but which is incomplete in this single known specimen. In life, the spine may have been up to twice the length preserved in the fossil. Farther back along the carapace are a pair very large extensions projecting posterolaterally. Each of these lateral extensions bears a smaller spine on its posterior margin. Towards the posterior end, the carapace constricts down to under two thirds of the main region's maximum width and gives way to the nuchal region. The posterior margin of the nuchal region bears a prominent medial indentation and two smaller lateral indentations.

Features like the presence of an anterior sagittal spine, presence of lateral extensions, and a narrow nuchal region are shared with the genus Pahvantia. However, traits like the much longer length of the anterior sagittal spine and the morphology of the lateral extensions separate Acanthopahvantia from Pahvantia. Comparisons can also be made to Hurdia (which shares an anterior sagittal spine), genera like Cambroraster, Titanokorys, and Cordaticaris (which share a developed nuchal region), and Zhenghecaris (which shares a similar morphology of the lateral extensions). However, all of these taxa differ morphologically from Acanthopahvantia in other ways.

== Classification ==
Acanthopahvantia's morphology indicates it belongs to the family Hurdiidae. This is further supported by phylogenetic analyses performed using Bayesian inference and maximum parsimony. Within Hurdiidae, Acanthopahvantia is thought to belong to the subfamily Hurdiinae. Maximum parsimony analysis recovers Acanthopahvantia as forming a clade with Cambroraster and Titanokorys.

Although Acanthopahvantia's carapace morphology distinguishes it from most other radiodonts known from the Wheeler Shale, no remains of the genus Buccaspinea preserve the central carapace element. As such, it is possible that Acanthopahvantia may be a synonym of Buccaspinea. However, Buccaspinea cooperi is only definitely known from the Marjum Formation, with a frontal appendage from the Wheeler Shale being only tentatively assigned to this taxon. As such, the team describing Acanthopahvantia opted to name it as a new genus.

== Paleoecology ==
The Wheeler Shale where Acanthopahvantia was found has preserved a diverse array of fossils, including algae, trilobites, other radiodonts, and a wide variety of other invertebrates. Around 95 species are known from the Drumian part of the formation in House Range. Acanthopahvantia is the fifth hurdiid known from the shale.

During the Miaolingian, when Acanthopahvantia lived, hurdiid radiodonts were undergoing a period of diversification and replaced other radiodonts as the dominant family. Acanthopahvantia's distinctive morphology was part of a trend of morphological diversification in hurdiids of the time.
