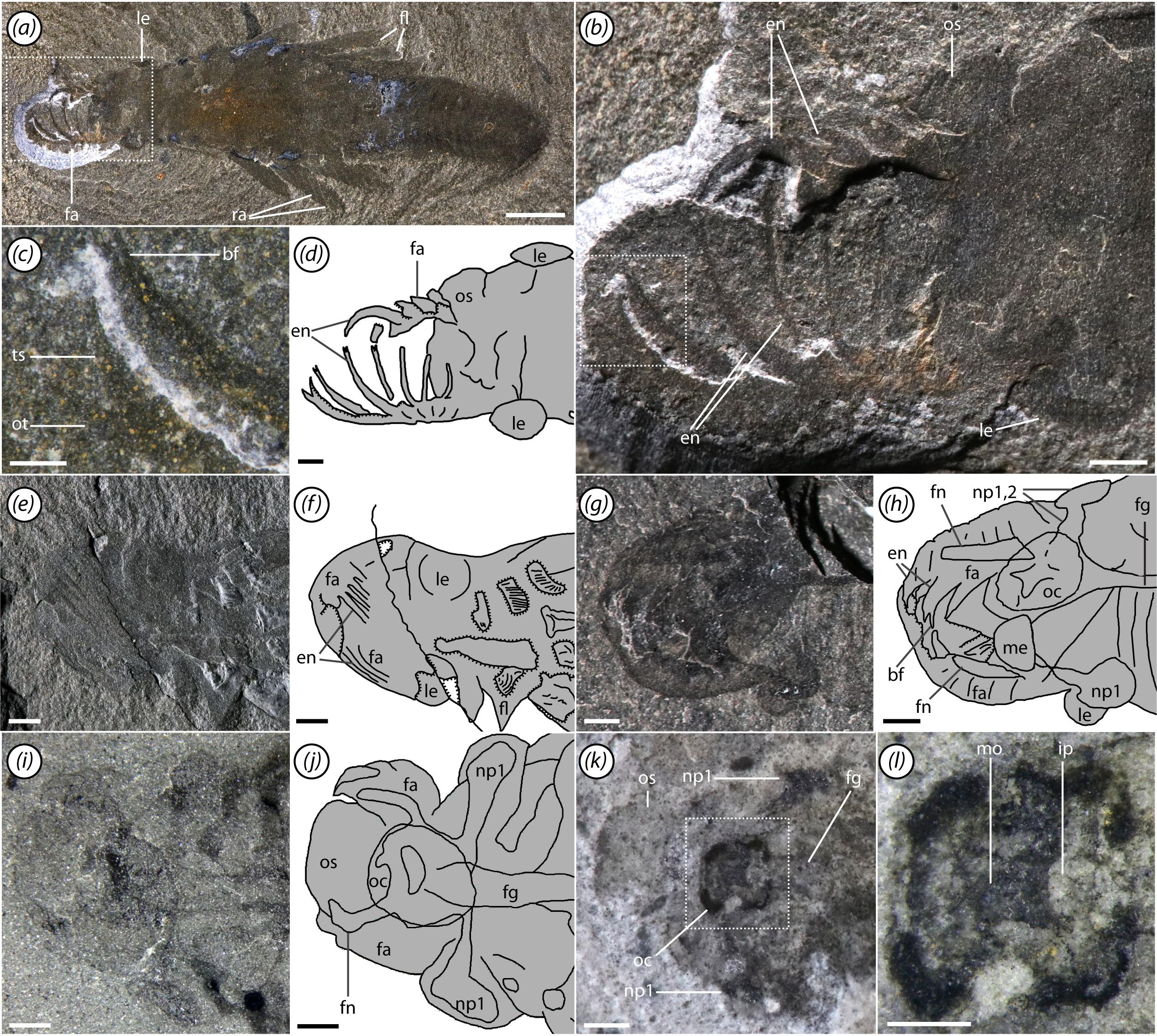
- Holotype of and four Mosura referred specimens

Scientific classification
- Kingdom: Animalia
- Stem group: Arthropoda
- Class: †Dinocaridida
- Order: †Radiodonta
- Family: †Hurdiidae
- Genus: †Mosura; Moysiuk & Caron, 2025
- Species: †M. fentoni

Binomial name
- †Mosura fentoni Moysiuk & Caron, 2025

= Mosura fentoni =

Mosura fentoni Temporal range: Miaolingian, ~505 Ma

Species of radiodont stem-arthropod

Mosura fentoni (IPA: [ˈmɒsuɾɑ]) is an extinct species of hurdiid radiodont from the Cambrian Burgess Shale in British Columbia, Canada. M. fentoni is the only species in the genus Mosura, and is known from sixty specimens collected between 1990 and 2022.

== Discovery and naming ==
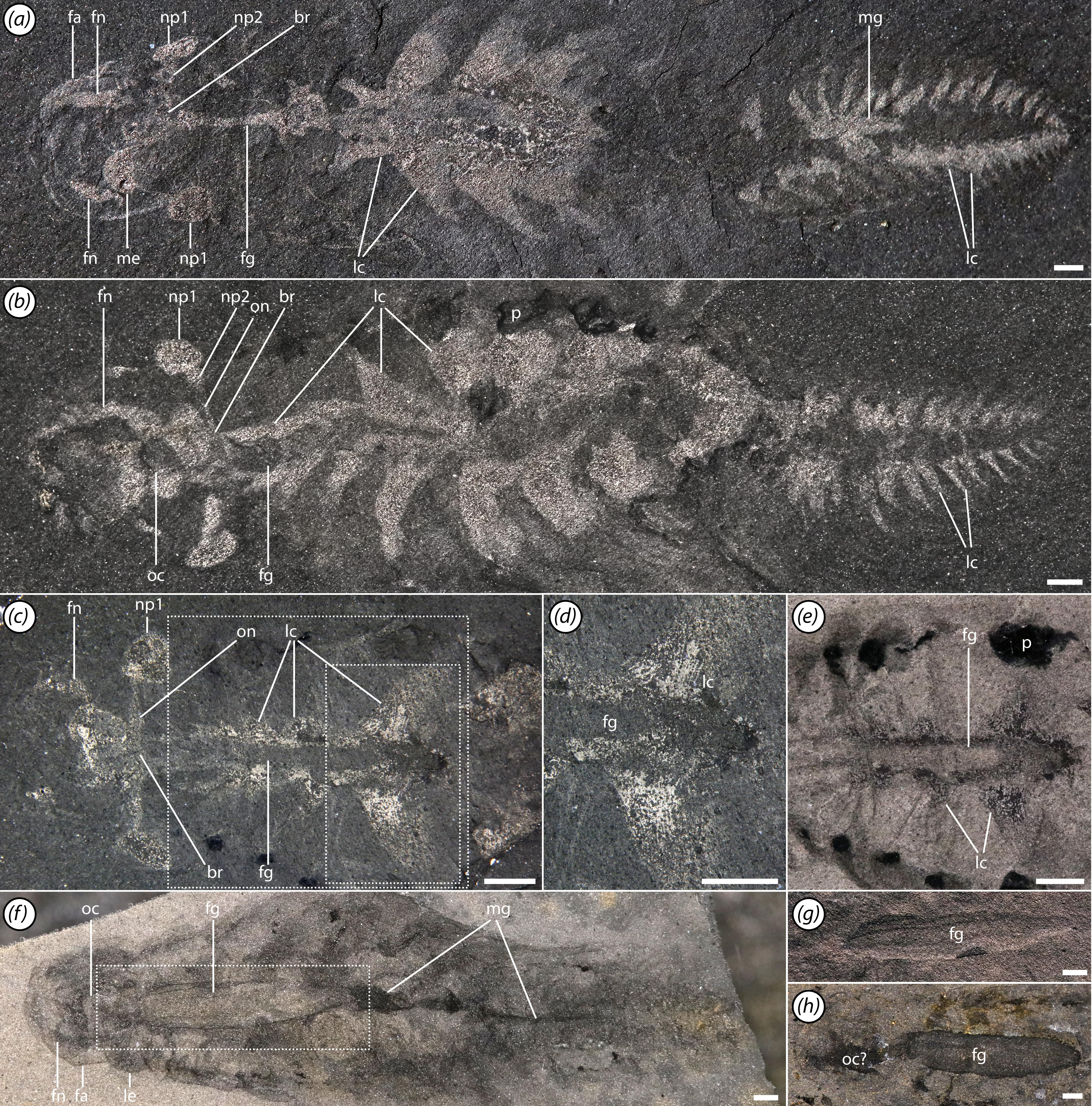
Various Mosura specimens that preserve internal organs

Mosura fentoni is known from sixty specimens. The holotype, ROMIP 67995 preserves a complete individual in dorsal view. Other notable specimens are ROMIP 66108, ROMIP 67998, ROMIP 68004, ROMIP 67999, and ROMIP 67979, which all preserve internal organs. The specimens were discovered in the Raymond Quarry and Marble Canyon localities within the Burgess Shale from 1990 to 2022, with the majority being placed in the invertebrate paleontology collection of the Royal Ontario Museum (ROMIP).

In 2025, Moysiuk & Caron described Mosura fentoni as a new genus and species of radiodont based on these fossil remains. The generic name, Mosura (IPA: [ˈmɒsuɾɑ]), is named after Mothra (モスラ, Mosura) a moth-like kaiju monster featured in films by the Japanese company Toho. The name was chosen for M. fentoni in reference to the animal's moth-like appearance. The name was romanized according to Hepburn style. The specific name, fentoni (IPA: [ˈfɛntənaɪ]), honours Peter E. Fenton and his work as a technician in the Royal Ontario Museum Invertebrate Palaeontology section, and for his unwavering friendship to both authors.

== Description ==
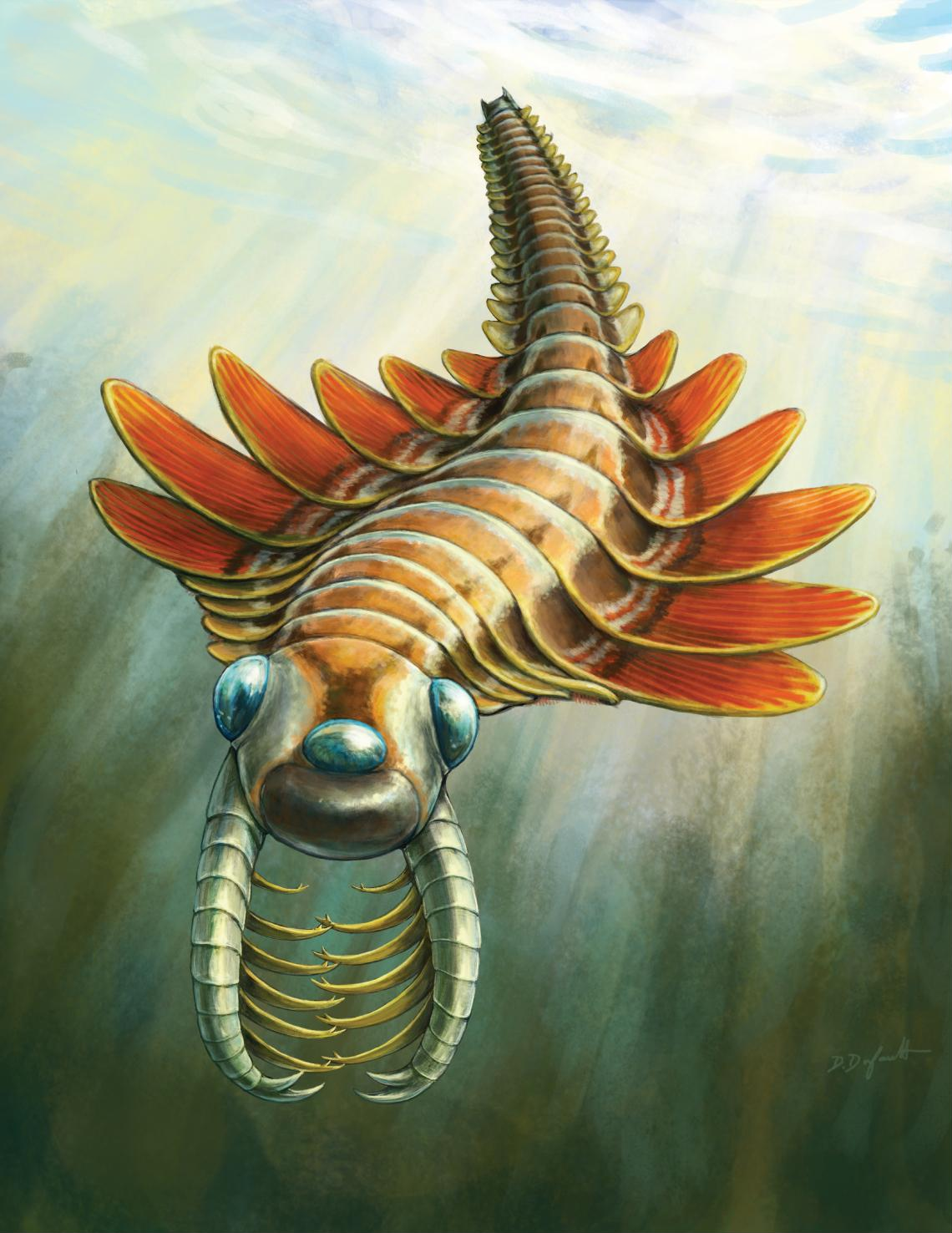
Paleoart

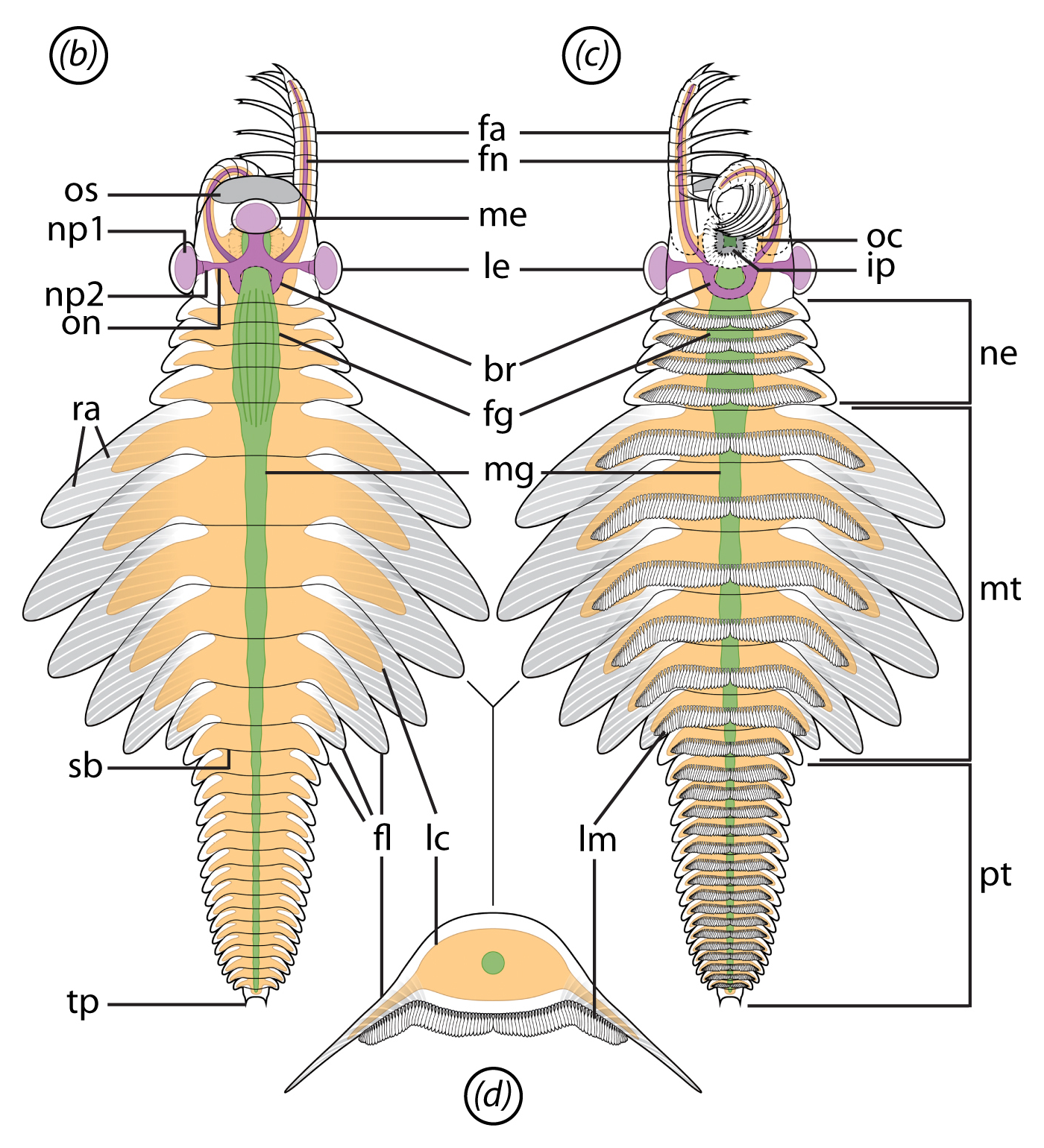
Diagrammatic reconstruction

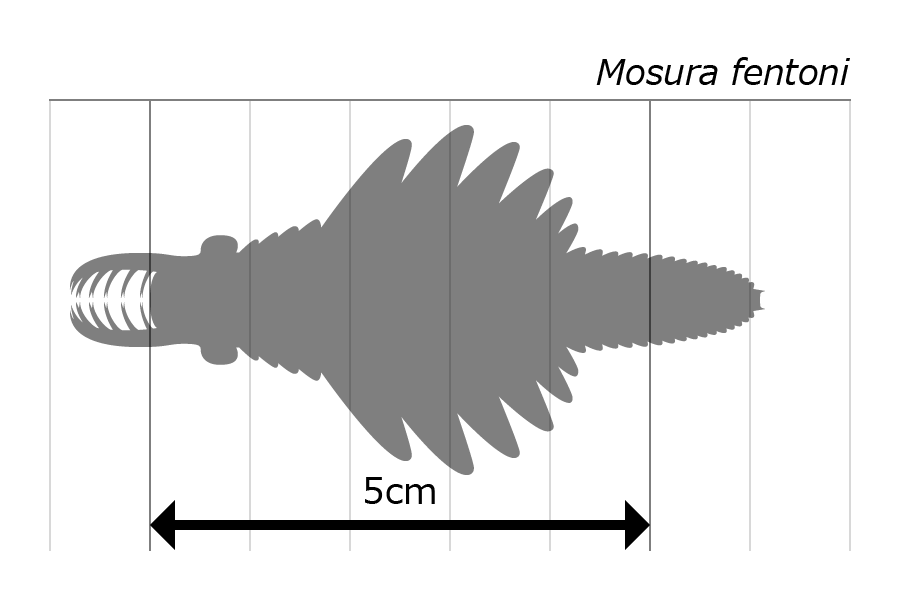
Size estimation

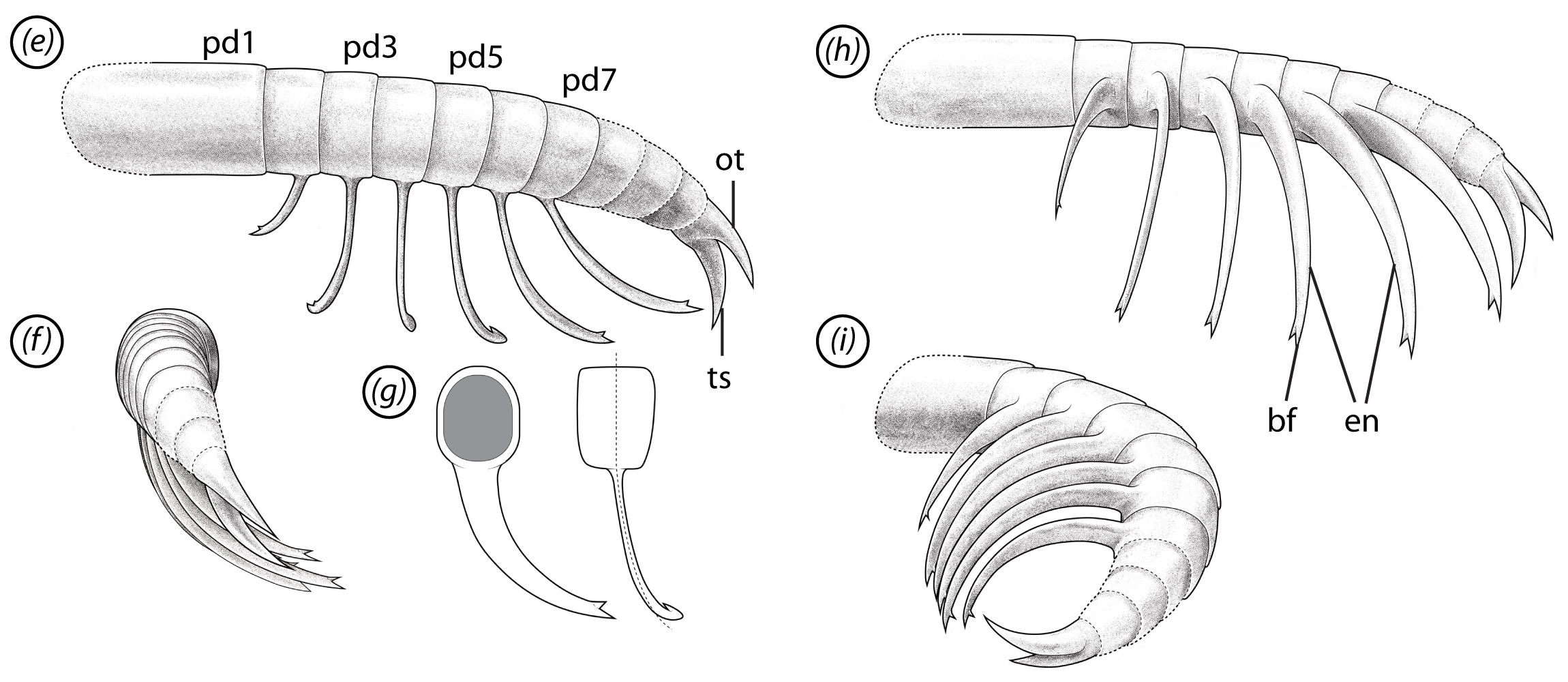
Reconstruction of frontal appendage

Mosura is known from specimens ranging in length from 1.5 to 6.1 centimetres (0.59 to 2.40 in), making this taxon one of the smallest radiodonts known. The head has three eyes: a pair of eyes on short stalks and a median (midline of the head) eye. The body is divided into 26 segments, the highest number found in any radiodont. The primary body sections are the head, the four-segmented neck, and the trunk. The trunk is divided into the anterior (toward the front) six-segmented mesotrunk, and posterior (toward the back) posterotrunk, which has at most 16 segments. Like other radiodonts, the body bears pairs of swimming flaps, which are considerably larger on the mesotrunk than on the posterotrunk. The gills are very large compared to body size.

Mosura is one of four radiodont taxa with known juvenile fossils (the other three being Lyrarapax unguispinus, Amplectobelua symbrachiata, and Stanleycaris hirpex). The juveniles in Mosura are distinguished by fewer segments in the posterotrunk, and possibly mesotrunk. An increase in total segment number during ontogeny (hemianamorphosis) is consistent with previous observations in Stanleycaris. Moysiuk and Caron (2025) noted that an increase in mesotrunk segment number implies that some posterotrunk segments would have differentiated during ontogeny, incorporating with the mesotrunk. They note that this is uncommon, but not unprecedented, as this has been observed in other arthropod groups, such as the fuxianhuiid Fuxianhuia.

== Classification ==
Mosura has a mixture of traits known from other basal hurdiids and non-hurdiids (elongate and multisegmented body, short head, distinct and constricted neck region, and small rounded H-element), traits apomorphic to Hurdiidae (single row of six elongate and mesially/toward the body midline curving endites on the frontal appendages), traits shared by other hurdiids (inner plates in the oral cone, tetraradial arrangement of the oral plates, absence of posterior auxiliary spines on the frontal appendage endites), and derived traits (median eye, specialised respiratory tagma). It is not known whether the median eye in this taxon was compound or if it had a single lens, however Moysiuk and Caron (2025) favor the single lens theory, pointing to similarities between it, and the potentially homologous median eyes seen in crown-group euarthropods. Similar to Stanleycaris, this taxon seemingly lacks lateral sclerites (formally known as P-elements), a trait only seen within hurdiidae between the two genera.

In their phylogenetic analysis, Moysiuk and Caron (2025) recovered Mosura as a basal (early-diverging) radiodont in the family Hurdiidae, finding it to be sister to all other hurdiids. Radiodonts are a diverse and long-lasting order of lower Paleozoic marine panarthropods. The results reproduced in the cladogram below are based on their pruned maximum clade credibility tree, they also produced a majority rule consensus tree where Mosura was found to be in a polytomy with Stanleycaris, Schinderhannes, Peytoia and the clade formed by Aegirocassis and Hurdiinae.

Mosura is one of three basal hurdiid genera that show a mixture of traits expected from hurdiids and non-hurdiids, the others being Stanleycaris (the only other radiodont taxon currently known with a median eye) and Schinderhannes. Regarding the specialised respiratory tagma, the authors speculate that they were—in conjunction with the reduced size—an adaptation for the oxygen-stressed environments that were proximal to the site of burial. However, while they find it unlikely, they could have been an adaptation to distinct behavioural traits such as the proposed nektobenthic sediment-sifting macropredatory ecology proposed for most hurdiids.

- Hurdiidae
  - Mosura fentoni
  - - Schinderhannes bartelsi
    - - - Stanleycaris hirpex
        - Peytoia nathorsti
      - - Aegirocassis benmoulai
        - Hurdiinae
          - - Hurdia victoria
            - Hurdia triangulata
          - - Pahvantia hastata
            - - Cordaticaris striatus
              - - Titanokorys gainesi
                - Cambroraster falcatus

== Ecology ==
Mosura is interpreted as an actively swimming (nektonic) predator of prey relatively large compared to its body size. Its large gills despite its small body size suggests it may have inhabited low oxygen environments such as the outer continental shelf. This taxon was most likely a highly maneuverable swimmer, with Moysiuk and Caron (2025) suggesting the median eye in this hurdiid functioned similarly to those seen in modern odonates (specifically dragonflies), and would have helped the radiodont maintain its orientation when chasing fast moving prey.

== See also ==
- Paleobiota of the Burgess Shale
