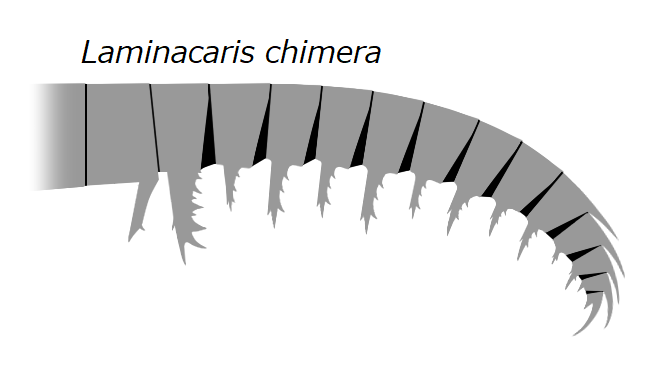
- Frontal appendage
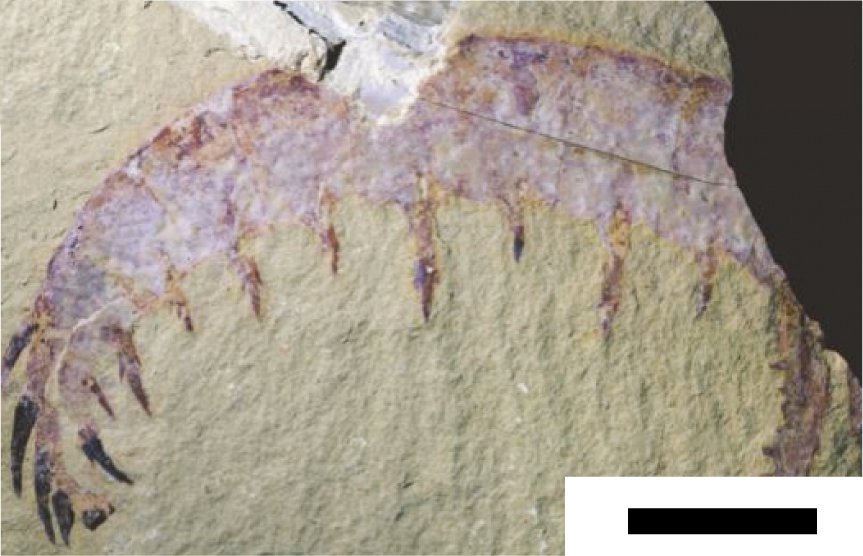
- Fossil of L. chimera

Scientific classification
- Kingdom: Animalia
- Stem group: Arthropoda
- Class: †Dinocaridida
- Order: †Radiodonta
- Genus: †Laminacaris; Guo et al., 2018
- Species: †L. chimera

Binomial name
- †Laminacaris chimera Guo et al., 2018

= Laminacaris =

Laminacaris chimera Temporal range: Cambrian Stage 3

Genus of extinct arthropods

Laminacaris is a genus of extinct stem-group arthropods (Radiodonta) that lived during the Cambrian period. It is monotypic with a single species Laminacaris chimera, the fossil of which was described from the Chengjiang biota of China in 2018. Around the same time, two specimens that were similar or of the same species were discovered at the Kinzers Formation in Pennsylvania, USA. The first specimens from China were three frontal appendages, without the other body parts.

== Discovery and naming ==
Laminacaris specimens were discovered from the mudstones of the Yu'anshan Member of the Chiungchussu Formation in eastern Yunnan Province, the Mafang section in the Haikou area at Kunming, and the Fengkoushao section, Chengjiang. The name is derived from Latin words, lamina meaning thin blade, and caris for crab; the species name refers to a Greek mythological creature, Chimera, that has a body composed of parts of more than one animal.

== Description ==
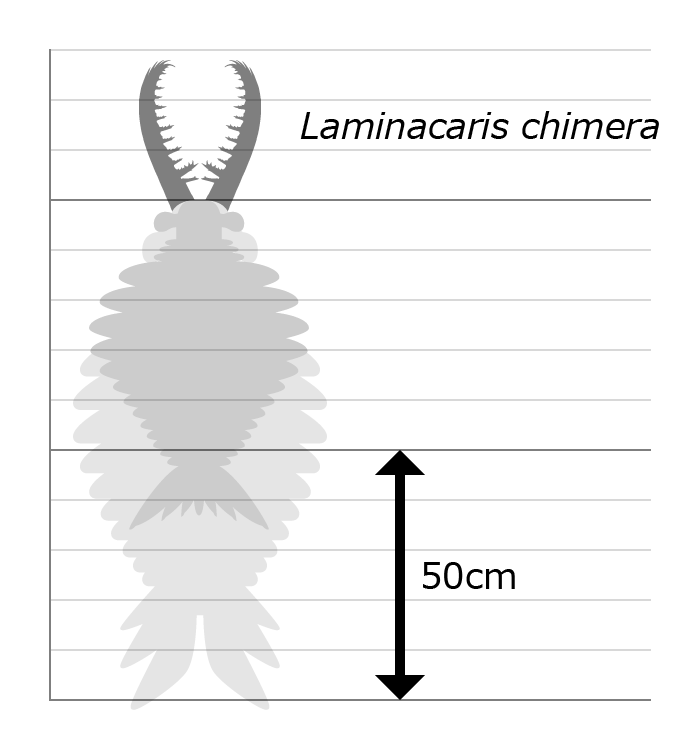
Laminacaris size diagram

The large frontal appendage is the most prominent and distinctive feature in Cambrian arthropods. The largest frontal appendage of Laminacaris (YKLP 13338) is around 28 cm (11 in) long, which would have belonged to an individual between 53.2–78.4 cm (20.9–30.9 in) long, based on proportion of Innovatiocaris (which was once treated as "Anomalocaris" saron). In many radiodonts and anomalocarids, the appendage is divided into segments called podomeres. Laminacaris's appendage has 15 podomeres, including 2 podomeres (podomeres 1 and 2) in the shaft and 13 (podomeres 3–15) in the distal articulated region. The appendage bears several spines called endites on each lobomere. The biggest endite called shaft endite at the base (towards the body) is small and straight in most Cambrian arthropods, but is large, recurved and bears auxiliary spines in Laminacaris, Echidnacaris briggsi and Pahvantia hastata.

== Classification ==
A discovery of Burgess Shale radiodont Cambroraster falcatus in 2019 that was classified as member of the family Hurdiidae, led to the justification that Laminacaris could be the closest relative of and sister to Hurdiidae among the Radiodonta. Laminacaris may be a transitional form that diverged from the common ancestors. Phylogenetic analysis based on the discovery of Pahvantia hastata, another member of Hurdiidae, shows that Laminacaris falls within the members of the family Anomalocarididae, next to Anomalocaris. In 2022, it is treated that is possibly related to Innovatiocaris and Guanshancaris. In 2023, its taxonomic position was recovered as Radiodonta incertae sedis.
