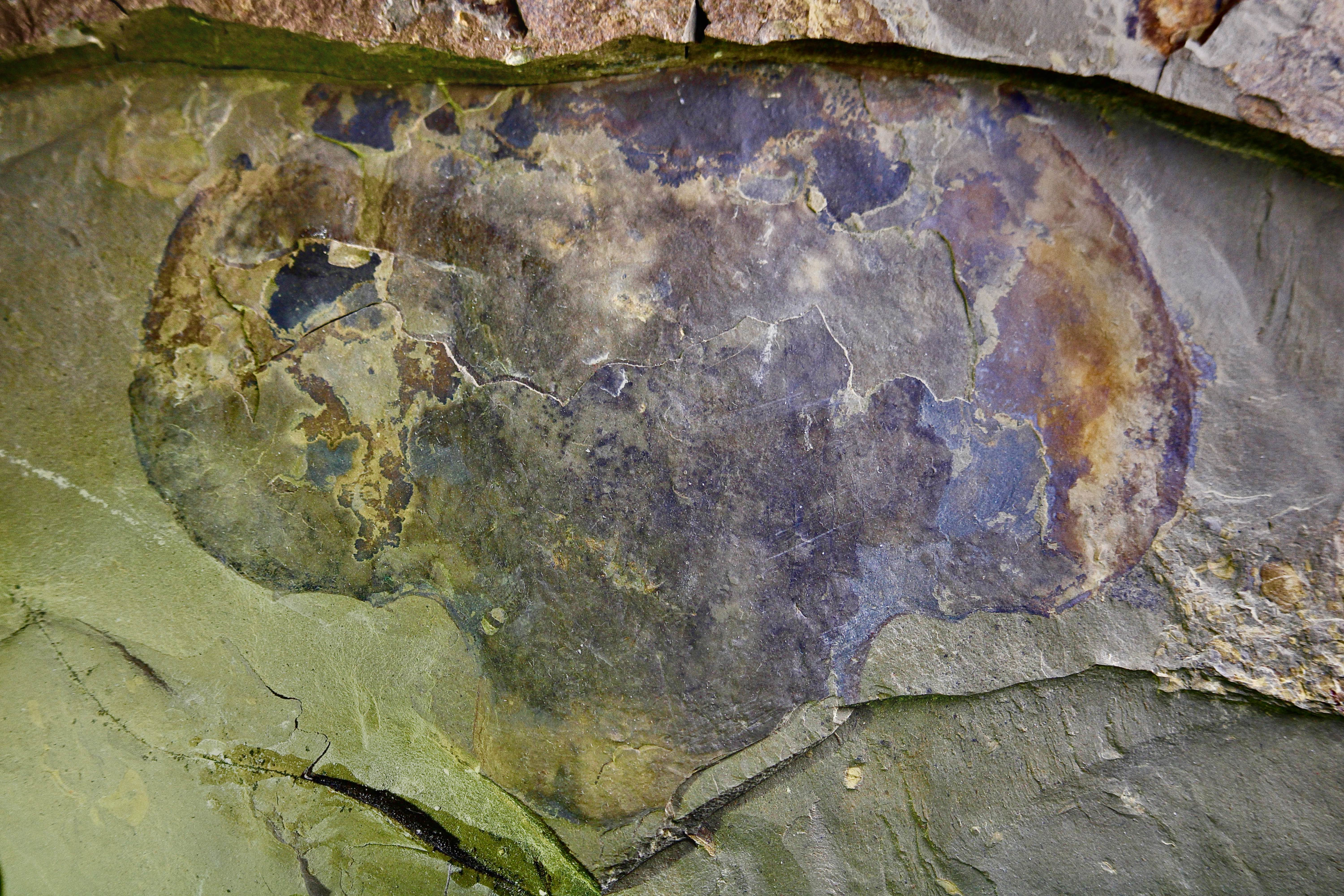
- The H-element of a large C. striatus from the Zhangxia Formation of China.
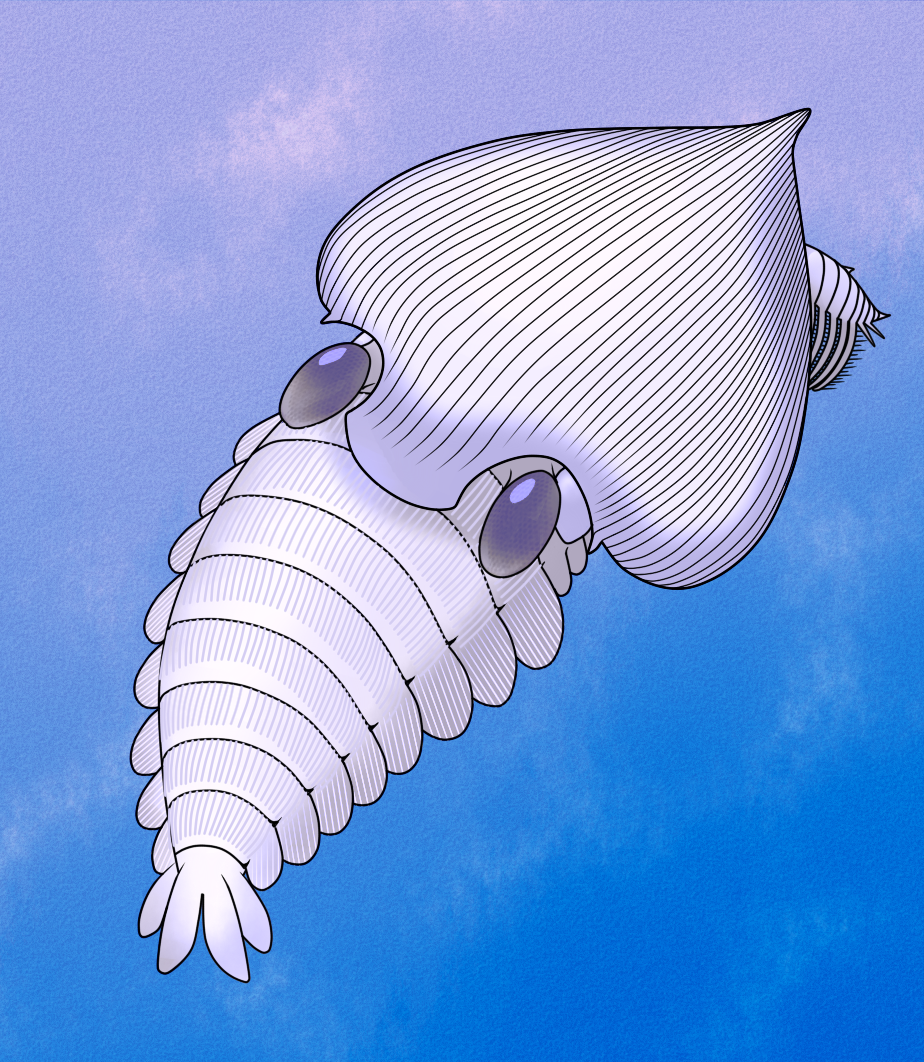
- Life restoration of C. striatus (the trunk region is speculative, being based on a close relative, Cambroraster).

Scientific classification
- Kingdom: Animalia
- Stem group: Arthropoda
- Class: †Dinocaridida
- Order: †Radiodonta
- Family: †Hurdiidae
- Subfamily: †Hurdiinae
- Genus: †Cordaticaris; Sun, 2020

Type species
- Cordaticaris striatus Sun, 2020

= Cordaticaris =

Cordaticaris Temporal range: Miaolingian

Genus of extinct stem-group arthropods

Cordaticaris (Note: From Latin cordatus for "heart-shaped", and "caris" for "shrimp") (heart-shaped shrimp) is a genus of extinct hurdiid (peytoiid) radiodont (stem-group arthropod) that lived in what is now northern China during the middle Cambrian period (Miaolingian, Drumian). This animal was described in 2020 based on remains found in the Zhangxia Formation, located in the Shandong Province. It is differentiated from other members of its family by its unique heart-shaped frontal sclerite (head carapace), and its frontal appendages bearing nine endites and seven more elongated subequal endites. This animal was important as it was the first Miaolingian aged hurdiid known from rock layers outside of laurentia, allowing paleontologists to get a better grasp of this families geographic range in life.

Hurdiids like Cordaticaris were the most diverse lineage of radiodonts, both in terms of geographic distribution, and ecological roles. They are differentiated from other radiodont groups by their large head sclerites, their tetraradial mouth-parts, and their appendages bearing around five subequal endites. The diversity of hurdiid head sclerites is notable, with some genera like Aegirocassis and Hurdia possessing long, pointed sclerites. While others like Cambroraster and Titanokorys possessed horseshoe-shaped sclerites.

== Description ==
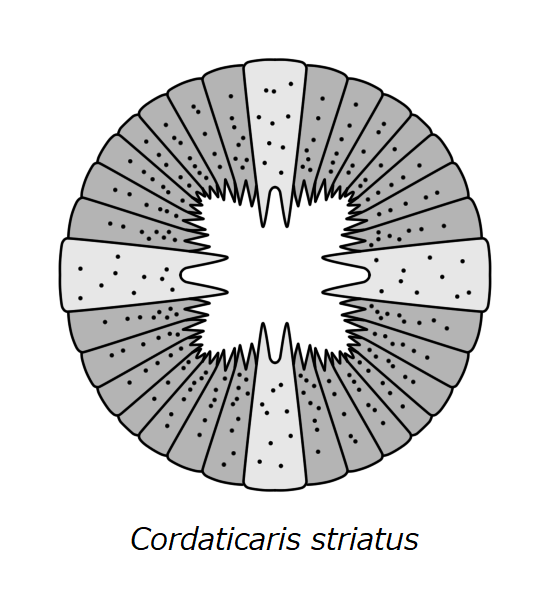
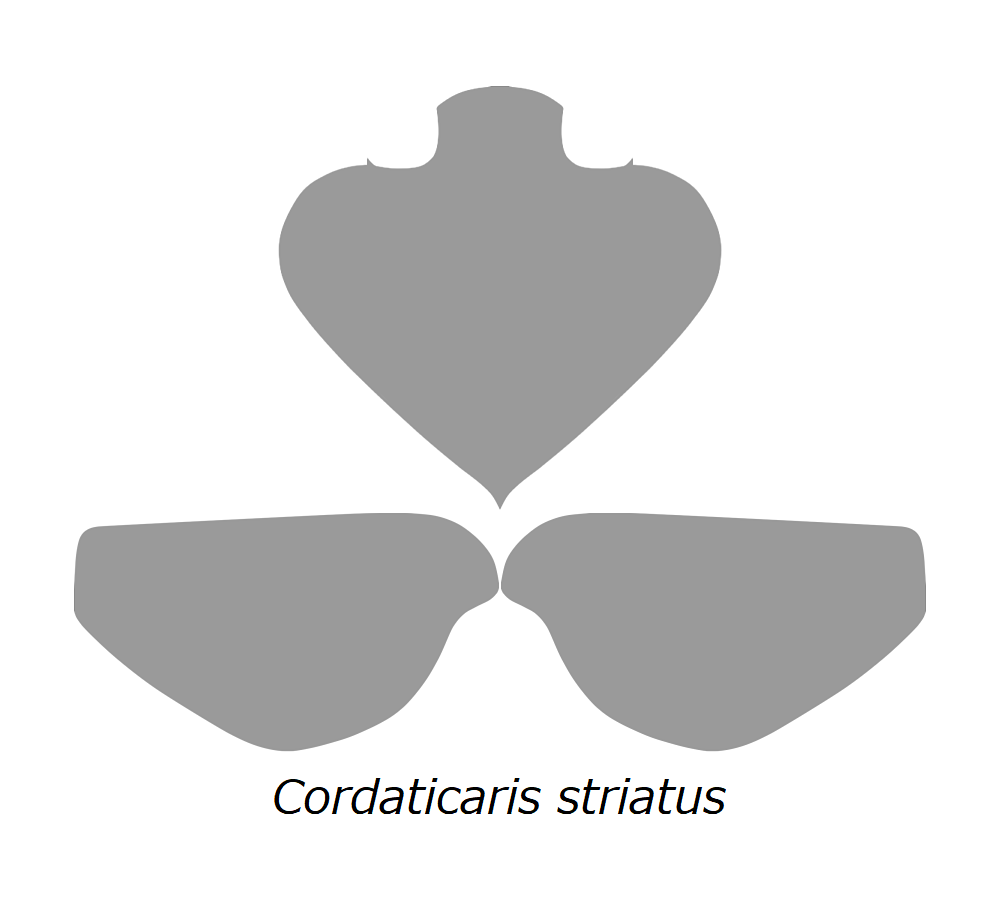
Diagrammatic reconstructions of Cordaticaris striatus showing the morphology of the oral cone and head sclerites.

Cordaticaris is known from a number of specimens (NIGPAS 173109–173117, 173313), all assigned to the singular species C. striatus. The oral cone of the animal (the circular mouth which sat underneath the head), was made up of around 32 plates, and was similar in appearance to that of the one possessed by Peyotia. The head sclerite was around 96mm long, and around 93mm wide at its largest. The sclerite bore a spiked end at the front as well as posterolateral notches. The lateral areas of the sclerite were lobate in appearance. The centre of the head sclerite was covered with tubercles arranged in lines running anteriorly, while the lateral expansions were smooth. The frontal appendages (long grasping appendages at the front of the radiodonts head) consisted of around 9 podomeres, which each bore long overlapping endites. These endites then bore around 20 or so long auxiliary spines, which were shaped like needles.

== Classification ==
The features present in Cordaticaris (cephalic carapace, elongated endites, and the oral cone shape) align it with the hurdiids. In 2022 when describing new remains of the basal hurdiid Stanleycaris, Moysiuk and Caron assigned Cordaticaris to a derived position within the hurdiid family alongside Cambroraster and Titanokorys.

Phylogentic position of Cordaticaris in relation to other radiodonts

- Radiodonta
  - Tamisiocarididae
  - - Anomalocarididae
    - Amplectobeluidae
    - Hurdiidae
      - Stanleycaris
      - - Schinderhannes
        - - Peytoia
          - - Aegirocassis
            - - Hurdia
              - - Pahvantia
                - - Cambroraster
                  - Titanokorys
                  - Cordaticaris

Phylogenetic position of Cordaticaris after Moysiuk & Caron 2022.

== Paleoecology ==
Cordaticaris fossils are known from a site called the Linyi Lagerstätte, which sits above the Panchegou Member within the larger Zhangxia Formation. The site is known for its soft bodied preservation, with some of the arthropod taxa known showing preserved digestive systems. According to the 2022 paper that analyzed the site, there are "35 fossil taxa, including four trilobites, one agnostoid, at least nine soft-bodied arthropods, two lophophorates, at least seven sponges, one chancelloriid, one priapulid, seven problematica, four macroalgae and four trace fossils". There are at least two genera of radiodonts known, Cordaticaris (which is the most abundant non-trilobite arthropod at the site), and a currently unnamed amplectobeluid known from several frontal appendages.
