= Huangshandongia =

Scientific classification
- Kingdom: Animalia
- Phylum: Arthropoda
- Class: †Dinocaridida
- Order: †Radiodonta
- Family: †Hurdiidae
- Genus: †Huangshandongia
- Species: †H. yichangensis

Binomial name
- †Huangshandongia yichangensis Cui & Huo, 1990

Genus of Radiodont

Huangshandongia is a genus of radiodont from the Shuijingtuo Formation in China. It was first interpreted as a Phyllocarid Crustacean and may be a synonym of Hurdia.
