= Liantuoia =

Liantuoia Temporal range: Cambrian stage 2

Scientific classification
- Kingdom: Animalia
- Phylum: Arthropoda
- Class: †Dinocaridida
- Order: †Radiodonta
- Family: †Hurdiidae
- Genus: †Liantuoia
- Species: †L. inflata

Binomial name
- †Liantuoia inflata Cui & Huo, 1990

Genus of radiodont

Liantuoia is a genus of radiodont from the Shuijingtuo Formation in China. It may be a synonym of Hurdia.
