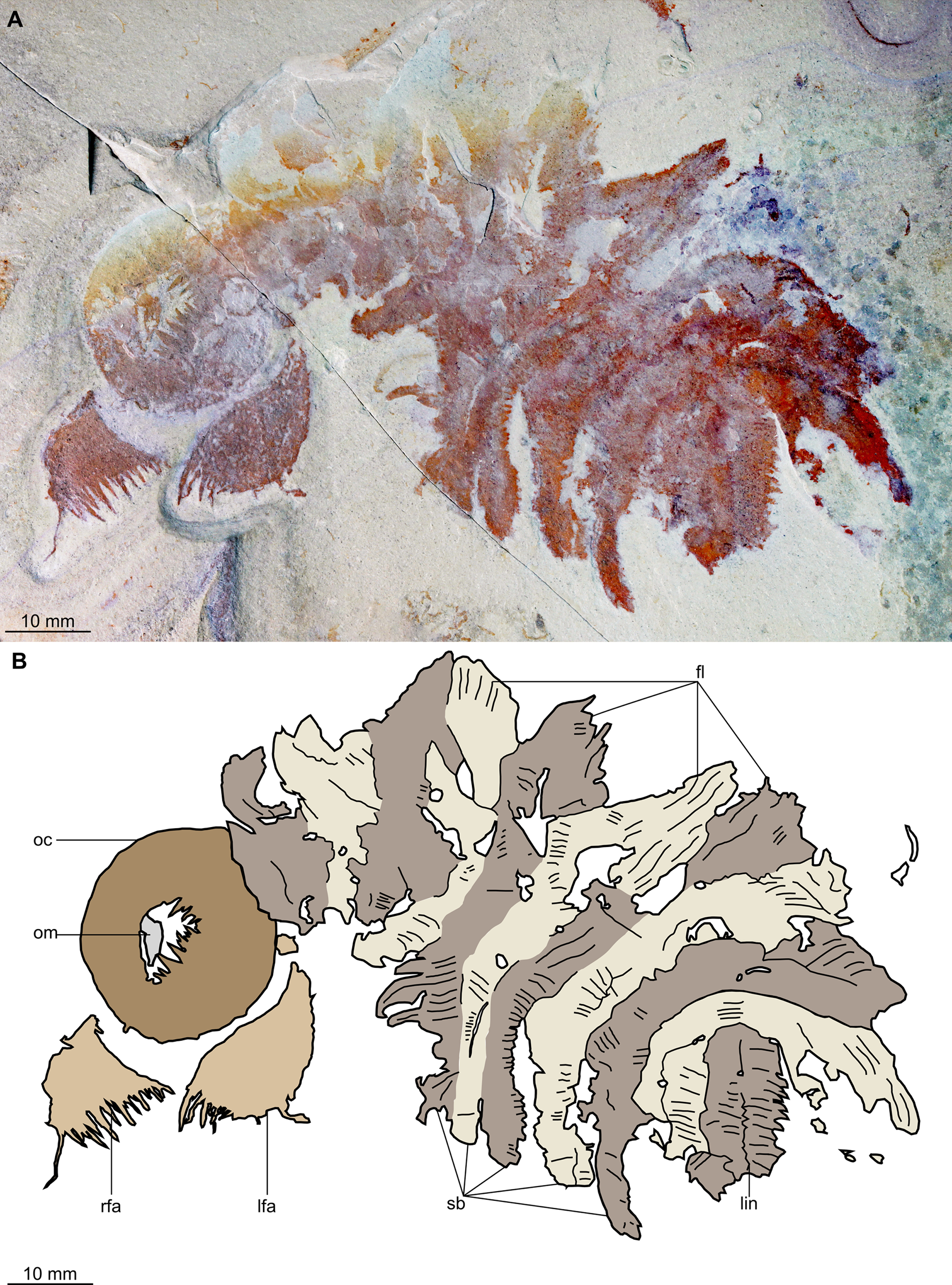
- Holotype specimen

Scientific classification
- Kingdom: Animalia
- Stem group: Arthropoda
- Class: †Dinocaridida
- Order: †Radiodonta
- Family: †Hurdiidae
- Genus: †Buccaspinea; Pates et al, 2021
- Species: †B. cooperi

Binomial name
- †Buccaspinea cooperi Pates et al, 2021

= Buccaspinea =

Buccaspinea Temporal range: Drumian

Extinct genus of radiodont

Buccaspinea is an extinct genus of Cambrian hurdiid radiodont from the Marjum Formation, known from frontal appendages and a nearly complete, albeit headless, specimen with a preserved oral cone. Buccaspinea was described in January 2021.

== Etymology ==
Buccaspinea means "thorn mouth", referring to the large hooked spines on its oral cone. The specific name, cooperi honours Jason Cooper, the discoverer of the specimen.

== Description ==
Buccaspinea is roughly 10 cm (4 in) long and has large, long-spined appendages seemingly used for capturing benthic prey, as they are not branched for sifting sediment or filter-feeding. Buccaspinea appears to be closely related to Hurdia and Peytoia, sharing many characters with them, for example a lack of inner teeth, weak posterior tapering and many flap-bearing segments. Unusually, it does not seem to have dorsal flaps, a trait unique to it and a few other hurdiids, such as Cambroraster.

== Gallery ==
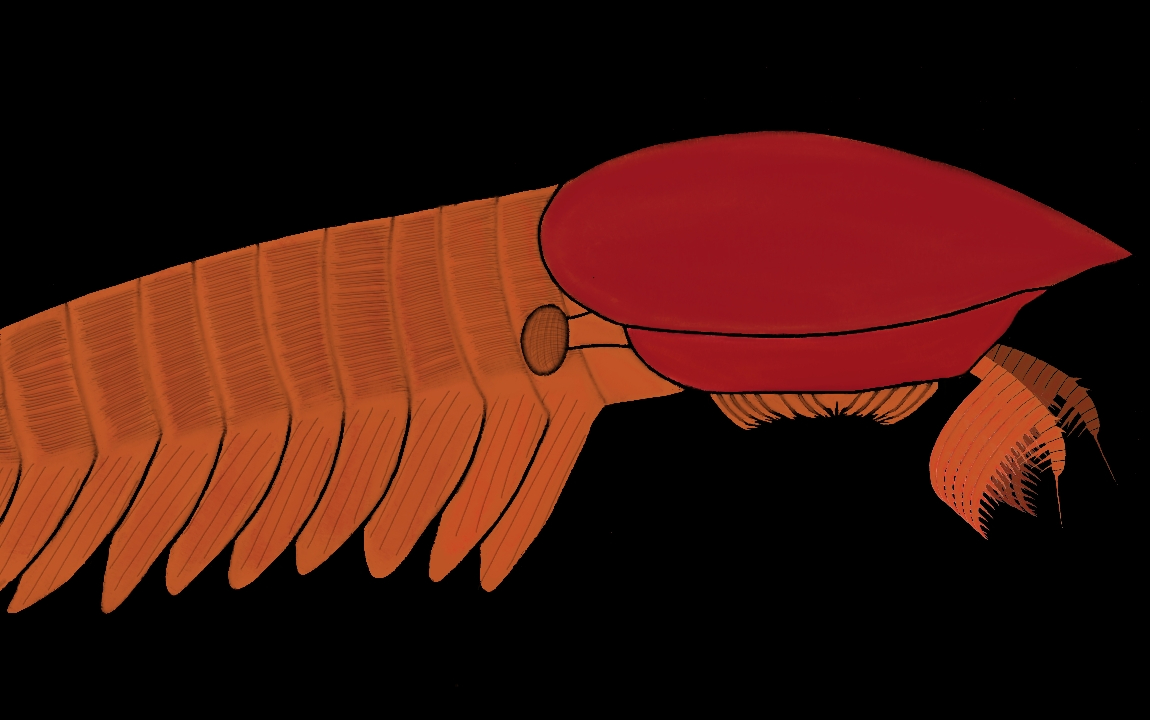
A reconstruction of the hurdiid radiodont Buccaspinea cooperi.

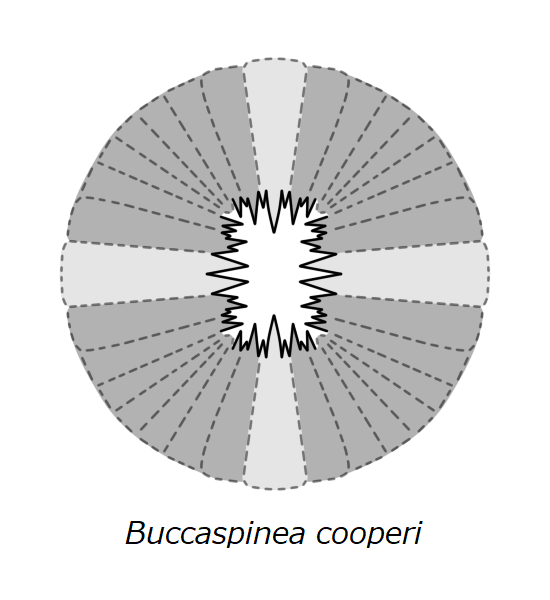
Diagram of the oral cone of Buccaspinea cooperi.

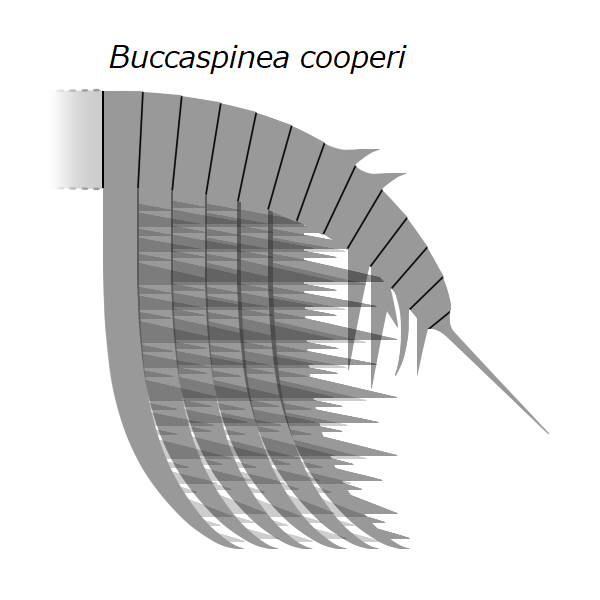
Diagram of the frontal appendage of Buccaspinea cooperi.
