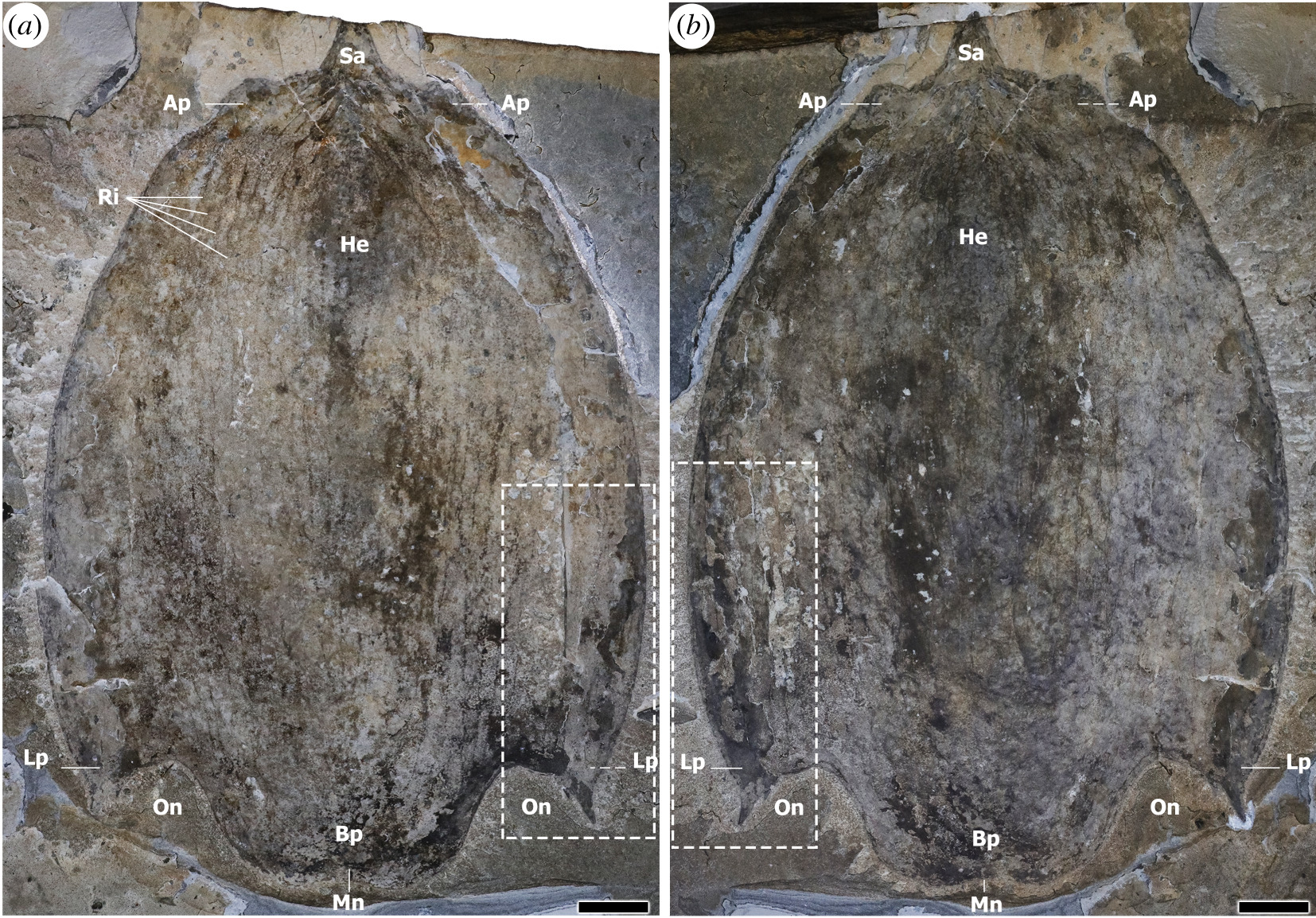
- The paratype specimen ROMIP 65168; an anterior sclerite

Scientific classification
- Kingdom: Animalia
- Stem group: Arthropoda
- Class: †Dinocaridida
- Order: †Radiodonta
- Family: †Hurdiidae
- Subfamily: †Hurdiinae
- Genus: †Titanokorys; Caron & Moysiuk, 2021
- Species: †T. gainesi

Binomial name
- †Titanokorys gainesi Caron & Moysiuk, 2021

= Titanokorys =

Titanokorys Temporal range: Miaolingian

Extinct genus of giant hurdiid radiodont

Titanokorys is a genus of extinct hurdiid (peytoiid) radiodont (a grouping of primitive stem arthropods which lived during the early Paleozoic) that lived during the Miaolingian epoch of the middle Cambrian. It is the largest member of its family from the Cambrian, with an estimated body length of around 50 cm (20 in) long, making it one of the largest animals of the time. It bears a resemblance to the related, and contemporary, genus Cambroraster. Fossils of T. gainesi were first found within the Marble Canyon locality of the Burgess Shale in 2018, however the fossils were not named until 2021 because they were assumed to be giant specimens of Cambroraster.

The taxon is one of several genera of radiodonts known from the Burgess Shale, with some of the others being Cambroraster, Anomalocaris, Peytoia, and Hurdia. Titanokorys is distinguished from other Burgess Shale radiodonts because of its large anterior sclerite (head covering carapace, or H-element) and a pair of spines on the anteroventral sides. Based on the shape of its appendages, Titanokorys is speculated to have used them to sift through the sand looking for prey. It is believed to have fed by using its anterior sclerite to scoop up organisms from the sea floor. Then it would use the endites on its frontal appendages (long grasping structures that all radiodonts possessed) to trap the prey item so it could start consuming it. Because of its size, Titanokorys was one of the dominant predators of the Burgess Shale and one of the largest animals in its ecosystem. However, it is a relatively rare faunal component, suggesting that the Burgess Shale represented the edge of this radiodonts geographic range.

== Etymology and history of research ==
The genus name refers to the Titans of Greek mythology in combination with the ancient Greek κόρυς (korys = "helmet") and alludes to the unusual size of the central carapace element. The species name "gainesi" honors the American geologist Robert R. Gaines, who was instrumental in the discovery of new fossil deposits in the Burgess Shale in 2012.

The first description of the genus and type species was made in 2021 by Jean-Bernard Caron and Joseph Moysiuk. This study was based on twelve specimens that came from the Marble Canyon area of Tokumm Creek in the northern part of Kootenay National Park in British Columbia. All previously known specimens are kept at the Royal Ontario Museum (ROM) in the Department of Invertebrate Paleontology (ROMIP). Before the animal was named, researchers often nicknamed it the "mothership" or "spaceship" in reference to its massive frontal sclerite (H-element) resembling a starship.

== Description ==
Fossils of Titanokorys are known from the Burgess Shale, a famous Lagerstätte from British Columbia dating to around 508 million years ago. Only disarticulated head sclerites, frontal appendages and oral cone (radiodont mouthpart that somewhat resembled a camera aperture) have been discovered. Due to the limited discovery, little is known about the oral cone of Titanokorys, but the tooth plates have smooth surfaces like most other hurdiids. Based on the largest sclerite (measured about 27 cm (11 in)) and ratio inferred from the closely related Cambroraster, the complete animal was estimated to be about 50 cm (20 in) long. Titanokorys is readily dintinguised from other radiodonts by the frontal sclerite with a trifurcate anterior region and lateral sclerites (P-elements). The frontal appendages are almost indistinguishable from those of Cambroraster, which have short podomeres with 5 long endites, each associated with a row of long, densely packed auxiliary spines. These appendages suggest a specialized "sweep feeding" behaviour that would allow the radiodont to catch and eat both microscopic and macroscopic food. Titanokorys lived alongside other Burgess Shale radiodonts, such as Anomalocaris, Hurdia, and Peytoia. The fact that so many large predatory radiodonts lived together suggests that Cambrian communities at the time were very diverse and could hold many large macro-predators.

=== Comparison to Cambroraster ===
Differences in several parts of the anatomy of Cambroraster and Titanokorys.

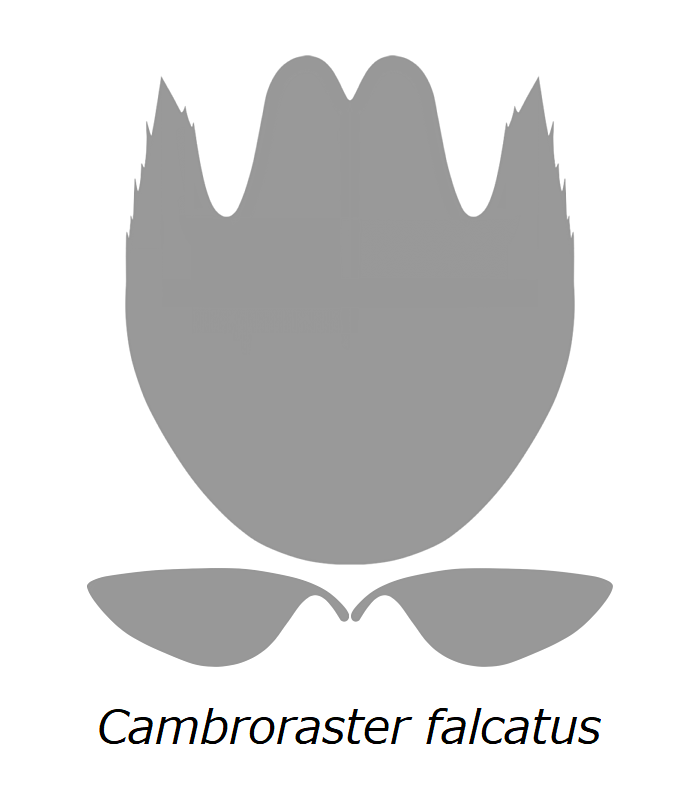
Head sclerite of C. falcatus

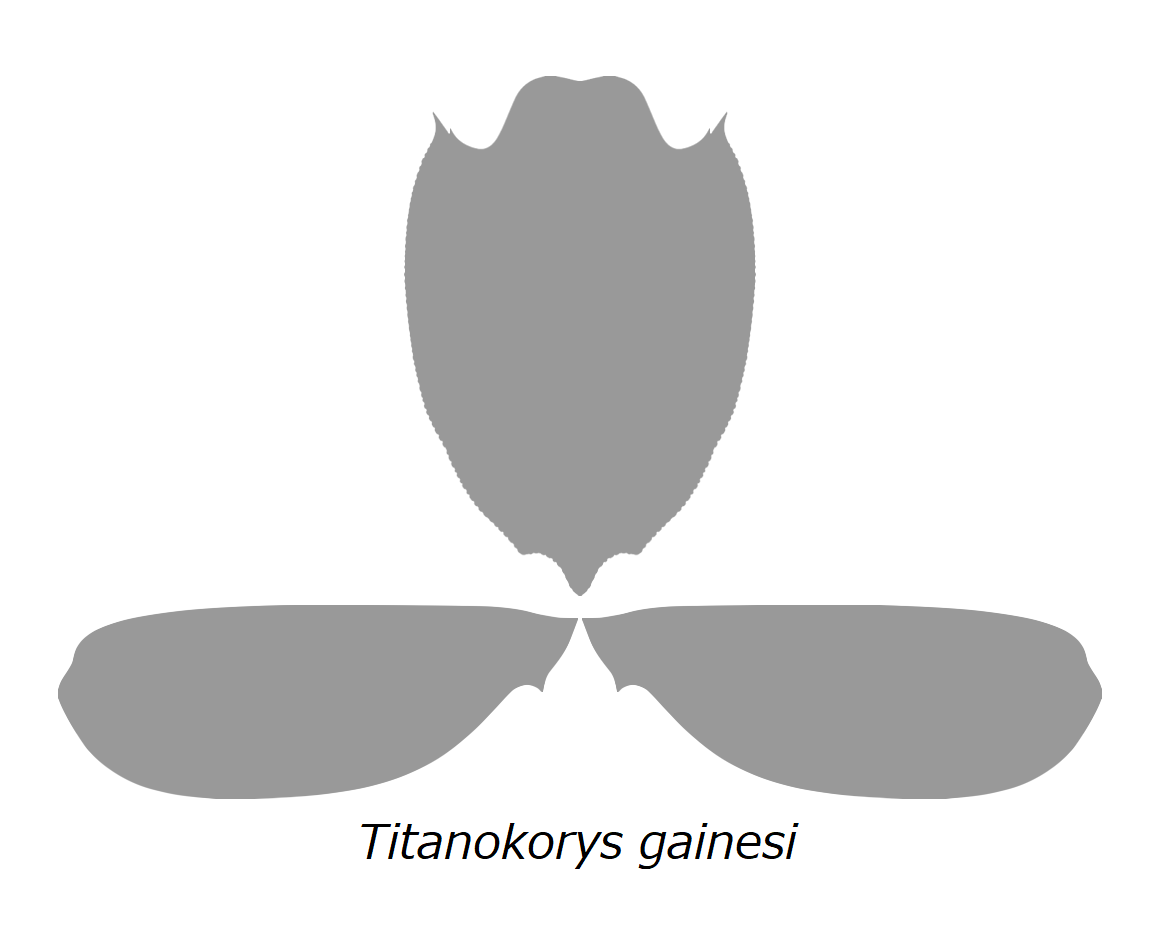
Head sclerite of T. gainesi

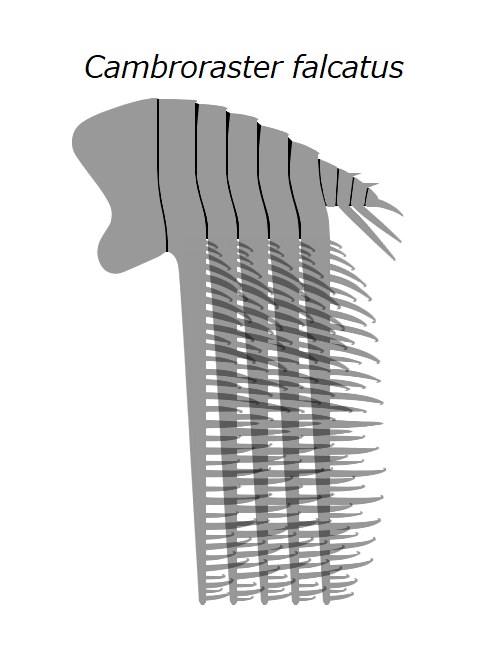
The grasping appendage of C. falcatus

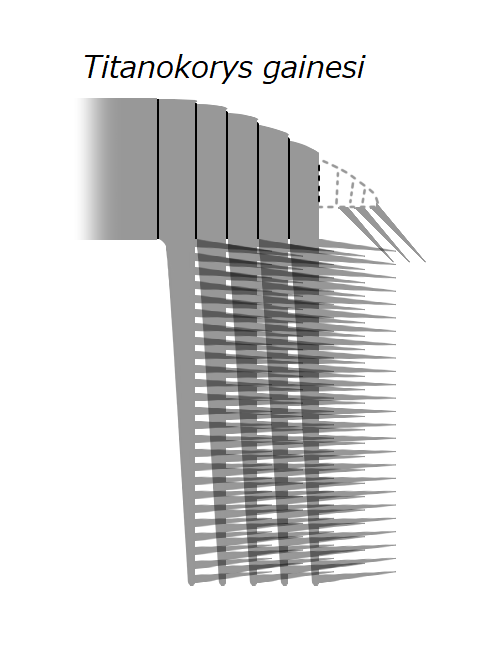
The grasping appendage of T. gainesi

A video reconstruction of C. falcatus

A video of a hypothetical reconstruction of T. gainesi based on Cambroraster

Living alongside Titanokorys was a similar-looking hurdiid radiodont called Cambroraster. This closely related genus is so similar to Titanokorys that the latter was originally thought to have been a giant specimen of the former genus and not a distinct taxon. The main difference between them is size, with Cambroraster reaching 30 cm (12 in) in length, while Titanokorys possibly reached a length of around 50 cm (20 in). Another difference is the shape of the sclerite, with Cambroraster having a horseshoe shaped sclerite that was 18 cm (7.1 in) in width for the largest specimen. On the other hand, Titanokorys had a more pointed, larger head sclerite which reached 27 cm (11 in) in length. The grasping appendages of the two genera are almost identical, though the secondary spines on the appendages of Titanokorys are longer than, and possibly not terminally hooked, as the ones seen in Cambroraster.

== Classification ==
Titanokorys is a radiodont belonging to the family Hurdiidae. Hurdiids can be distinguished from other radiodonts by the rake-like frontal appendages which each bore a single row of elongated endites with only anterior auxiliary spines, alongside the combination of enlarged head sclerites and tetraradial mouthparts (oral cone). Titanokorys was found to form a derived clade with Cordaticaris, Cambroraster and possibly also Zhenghecaris. While Stanleycaris and Schinderhannes were found as the most basal hurdiids.

- Hurdiidae
  - Mosura fentoni
  - - Schinderhannes bartelsi
    - - - Stanleycaris hirpex
        - Peytoia nathorsti
      - - Aegirocassis benmoulai
        - Hurdiinae
          - - Hurdia victoria
            - Hurdia triangulata
          - - Pahvantia hastata
            - - Cordaticaris striatus
              - - Titanokorys gainesi
                - Cambroraster falcatus

Phylogenetic placement of Titanokorys, performed by Moysiuk and Caron (2025).

== Ecology ==
Like many other hurdiid radiodonts, Titanokorys was most likely a nektobenthic animal that swam slowly above the seabed and sifted through sediments. It is presumed that the animal dug up the sediment with its huge protruding carapace and guided the prey into its mouth, with the frontal appendages forming a cage-like structure. Since fossils may be preserved together alongside Cambroraster, it is presumed that Titanokorys lived in the same areas as Cambroraster. Titanokorys is a relatively rare find at Marble Canyon, because of this it is thought that this fossil site possibly occurred near the edge of the species range in life.

Due to the depth of the Marble canyon site In comparison to the Cathedral Escarpment, Titanokorys, and the contemporary fauna most likely inhabited a mesopelagic environment. Recent studies have also found evidence of brine pools in the area, suggesting that these formations would've been present in some areas of the benthic environment.

Based on differences in size, Titanokorys probably escaped competition with Cambroraster by hunting larger prey, thereby exploiting a different ecological niches. Aside from Cambroraster, other creatures lived alongside T. gainesi. The fauna in the region included the basal hurdiid Mosura fentoni, hymenocarine arthropods such as Tokummia and Balhuticaris, the primitive chordate Metaspriggina, and the isoxyid arthropod Surusicaris. Like all stem and total group arthropods, Titanokorys had to shed its outer skin to grow larger. This is evidenced by the holotype specimen (ROMIP 65415) which probably represents a collection of molted remains. Sometimes, fossils of these exuvia are found alongside numerous specimens of the agnostid arthropod genus Peronopsis in the immediate vicinity or directly on the exuvia. Why the arthropods were on the exuvia is unclear, but they could have been eating from the molting residues or grazed on a possible biofilm that was growing on it.

== See also ==
- Paleobiota of the Burgess Shale
