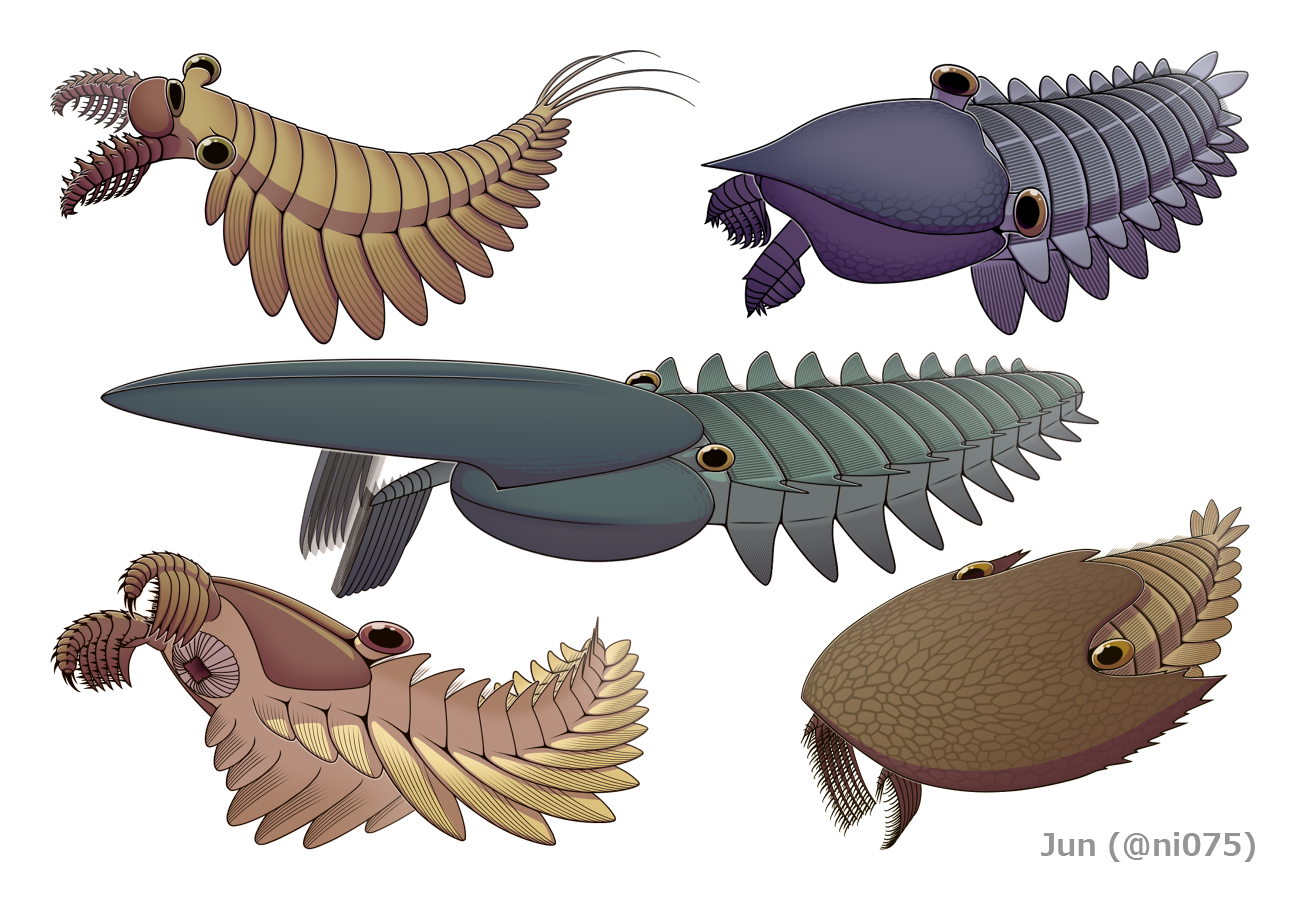
- Stanleycaris (top left), Hurdia (top right), Aegirocassis (middle), Peytoia (bottom left), Cambroraster (bottom right)

Scientific classification
- Kingdom: Animalia
- Stem group: Arthropoda
- Class: †Dinocaridida
- Order: †Radiodonta
- Family: †Hurdiidae; Vinther et al., 2014

Genera
- See text

= Hurdiidae =

Hurdiidae Temporal range: Cambrian Stage 3–Emsian

Extinct family of arthropods

Hurdiidae (synonymous with the previously named Peytoiidae) is an extinct cosmopolitan family of radiodonts, a group of stem-group marine arthropods, which lived during the Paleozoic Era. It is the most long-lived radiodont clade, lasting from the Cambrian period to the Devonian period.

== Description ==
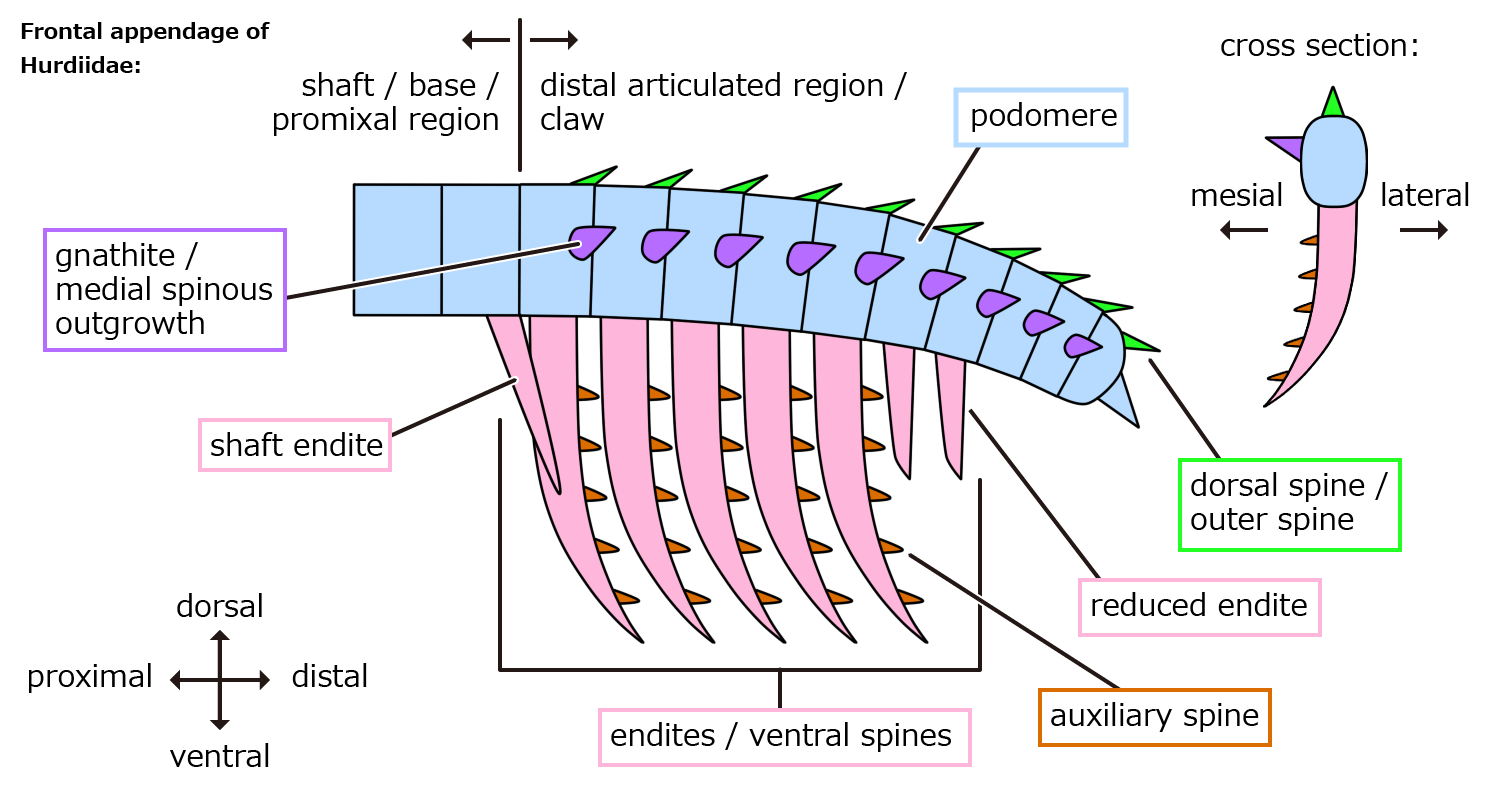
Anatomy of the frontal appendage of a hurdiid

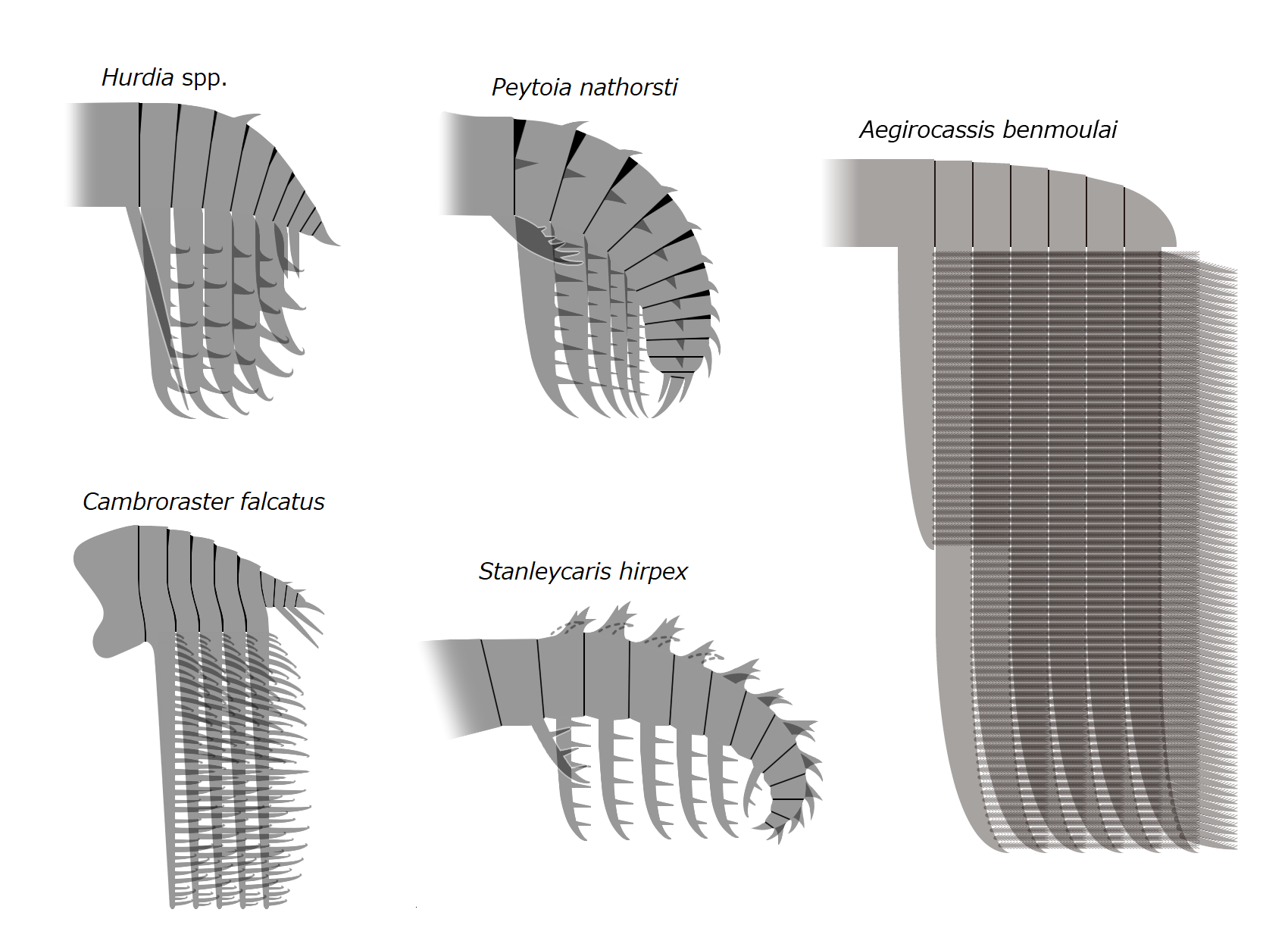
Frontal appendages of various species of hurdiid

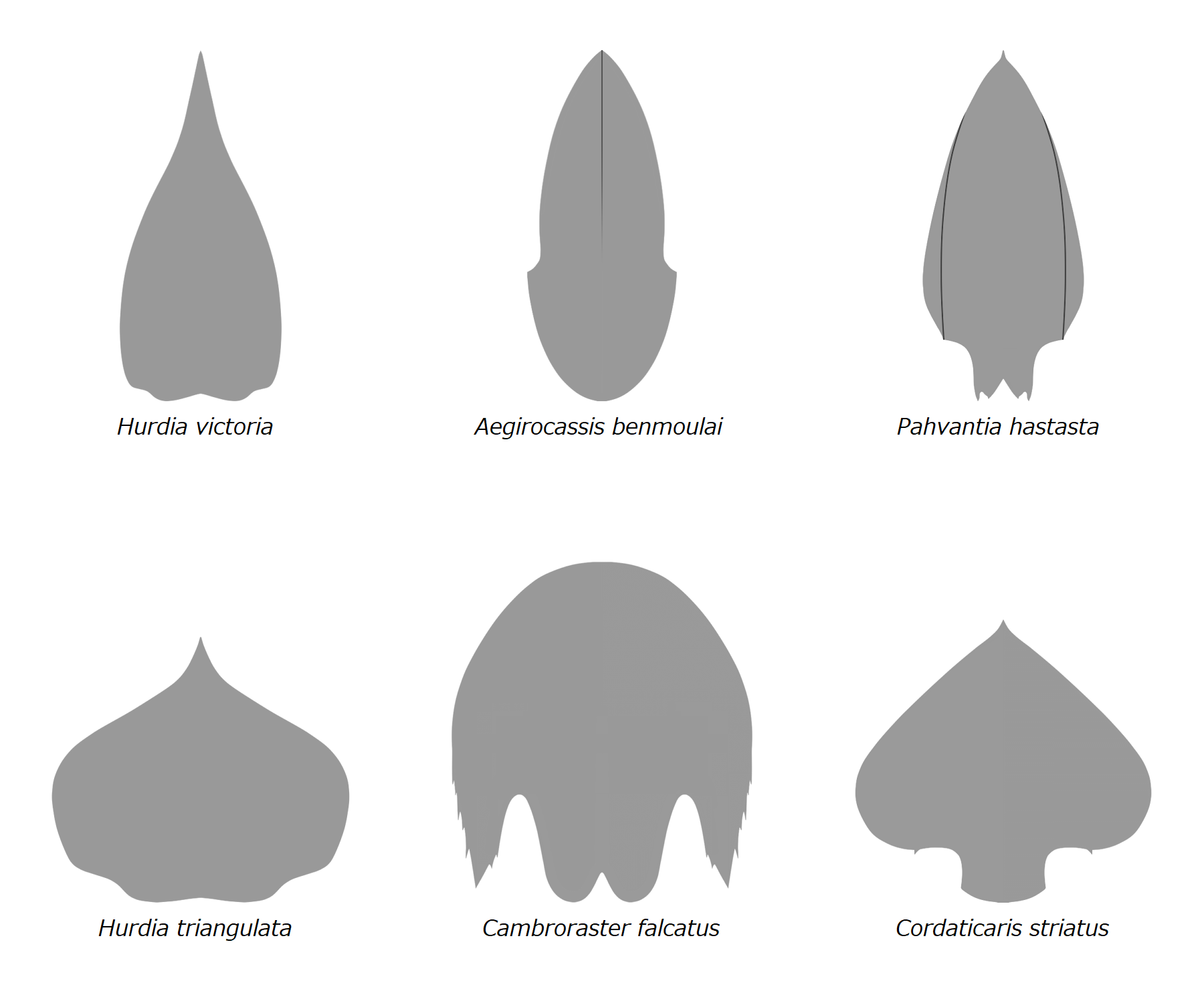
Dorsal carapaces of various species of hurdiid

Hurdiidae is characterized by frontal appendages with distal region composed of 5 subequal blade-like endites, alongside the enlarged head carapaces and tetraradial mouthpart (oral cone).

The frontal appendages of hurdiids have a distinctive morphology, with the appendage of most species bearing five equally-sized elongate blade-like ventral spines known as endites. Subsequent podomeres were reduced in size and with only small endites or none. Each podomere bore only a single endite, unlike other radiodonts, in which the endites were paired. In most species, the endites were curved medially, so that the appendages formed a basket-like structure. Some hurdiids had greater numbers of endites, with Cordaticaris bearing seven endites of equal length.

Hurdiids exhibited a wide range of body size. The smallest known hurdiid specimen, of an unnamed species, is estimated to have had a body length of 6–15 millimetres (0.24–0.59 in), but it is not known whether this specimen was a juvenile or an adult. Aegirocassis, the largest known hurdiid, was over 2 metres (6.6 ft) long, comparable in size to the largest known arthropods.

== Paleobiology ==
The majority of hurdiids appear to have been predators that fed by sifting sediment with their frontal appendages, but some members, like Aegirocassis, Pseudoangustidontus, and possibly Cambroraster, were suspension feeders.

== Distribution ==
Hurdiids had a global distribution. The earliest known hurdiid in the fossil record is Peytoia infercambriensis, which lived during the third age of the Cambrian in what is now the country of Poland. The group increased in diversity during the Miaolingian epoch. Post-Cambrian records of the group are rare, but the group lasted into the Devonian period, with the last known taxon being the Emsian Schinderhannes bartelsi from what is now Germany.

== Classification ==
Hurdiidae is classified within Radiodonta, a clade of stem-group arthropods. Hurdiidae is defined phylogenetically as the most inclusive clade containing Hurdia victoria but not Amplectobelua symbrachiata, Anomalocaris canadensis, or Tamisiocaris borealis. Some authors have argued that Peytoiidae, which was named by Conway Morris and Robison, 1982, has priority over Hurdiidae, and that Hurdiidae has "yet to be properly established following ICZN standards", due to its first definition not having a character-based diagnosis, and the second being published in an online-only journal without being registered in the ZooBank database.

Cladogram of Hurdiidae after Moysiuk & Caron, 2025:

- Hurdiidae
  - Mosura fentoni
  - - Schinderhannes bartelsi
    - - - Stanleycaris hirpex
        - Peytoia nathorsti
      - - Aegirocassis benmoulai
        - Hurdiinae
          - - Hurdia victoria
            - Hurdia triangulata
          - - Pahvantia hastata
            - - Cordaticaris striatus
              - - Titanokorys gainesi
                - Cambroraster falcatus

Species include:

- Falciscaris mumakiana
- Mosura fentoni
- Peytoia nathorsti
- Peytoia infercambriensis
- Schinderhannes bartelsi
- Stanleycaris hirpex
- Stanleycaris qingjiangensis
- Ursulinacaris grallae
- Hurdiinae
  - Acanthopahvantia boardmani
  - Buccaspinea cooperi
  - Cambroraster falcatus
  - Cordaticaris striatus
  - Hurdia triangulata
  - Hurdia victoria
  - Pahvantia hastata
  - Titanokorys gainesii
  - Zhenghecaris shankouensis?
- Aegirocassisinae
  - Aegirocassis benmoulai
  - Pseudoangustidontus duplospineus
  - Pseudoangustidontus izdigua

Tauricornicaris was previously considered as a member of Hurdiidae, but fossils of it were later reinterpreted to be euarthropod tergites.

Zhenghecaris was originally described as a thylacocephalan, but it was later considered a hurdiid dorsal carapace. However, its placement is questioned by some researchers, since its classification as a radiodont is largely based on the characters of Tauricornicaris.

While Schinderhannes was originally described as a stem-arthropod with characters of both euarthropods and radiodonts, this interpretation was denied and most researchers now agree that it is a hurdiid radiodont. A few researchers have raised questions about its classification as a hurdiid.

Huangshandongia yichangensis, Liantuoia inflata and Proboscicaris hospes may represent species of Hurdia.
