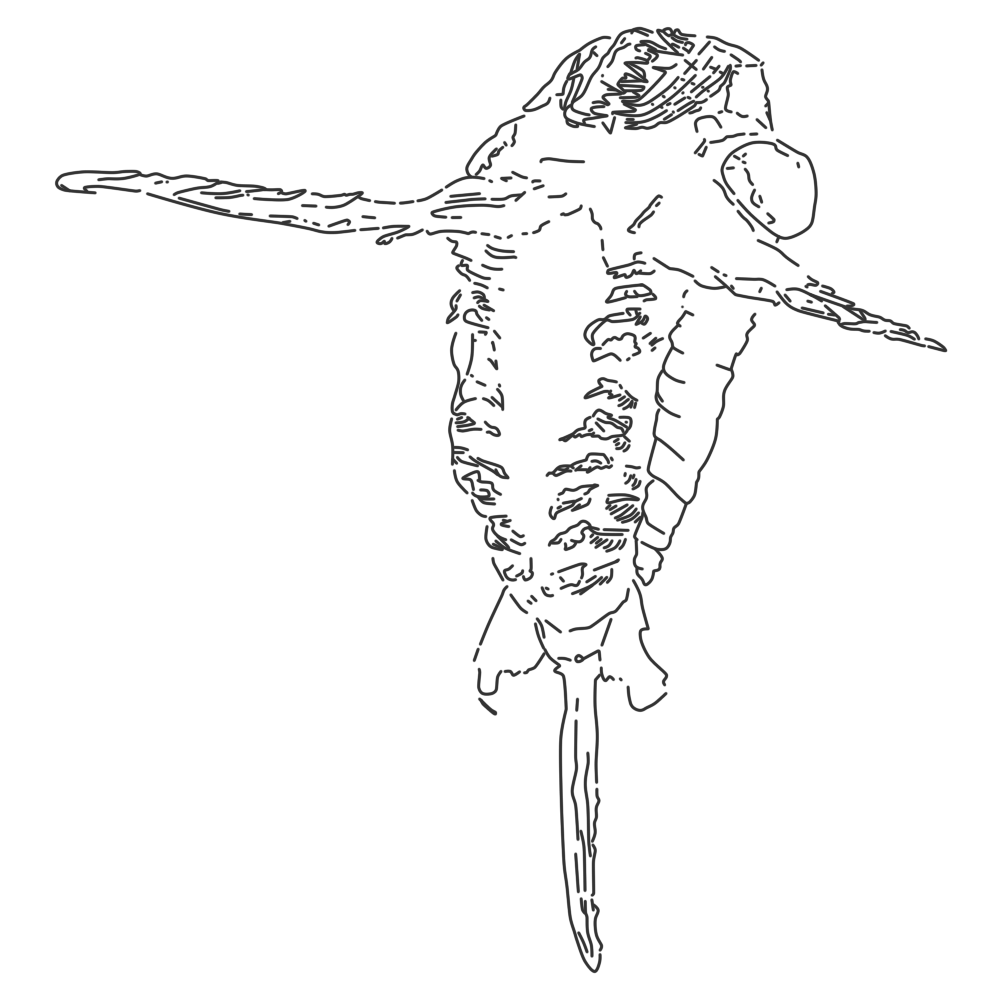
- Drawing of the holotype specimen

Scientific classification
- Kingdom: Animalia
- Stem group: Arthropoda
- Class: †Dinocaridida
- Order: †Radiodonta
- Family: †Hurdiidae
- Genus: †Schinderhannes
- Species: †S. bartelsi

Binomial name
- †Schinderhannes bartelsi Kühl, Briggs & Rust, 2009

= Schinderhannes bartelsi =

Schinderhannes bartelsi Temporal range: Early Devonian 408–400 Ma

Extinct species of radiodont

Schinderhannes bartelsi is a fossil species of hurdiid radiodont, known from a single specimen from the Lower Devonian Hunsrück Slate in Germany. Its discovery expanded the known range of radiodonts, the latest members of which were previously known only from the Early Ordovician, over 60 million years earlier than Schinderhannes bartelsi.

== Discovery and naming ==
Schinderhannes is represented by a single specimen that was discovered in the Eschenbach-Bocksberg Quarry in the municipality of Bundenbach in Rhineland-Palatinate, Germany. The specimen is currently housed in the Naturhistorisches Museum in Mainz.

The animal gets its generic name from Schinderhannes, an outlaw who frequented the area it was found. Its specific epithet "bartelsi" honors Christoph Bartels, a Hunsrück Slate expert.

== Description ==
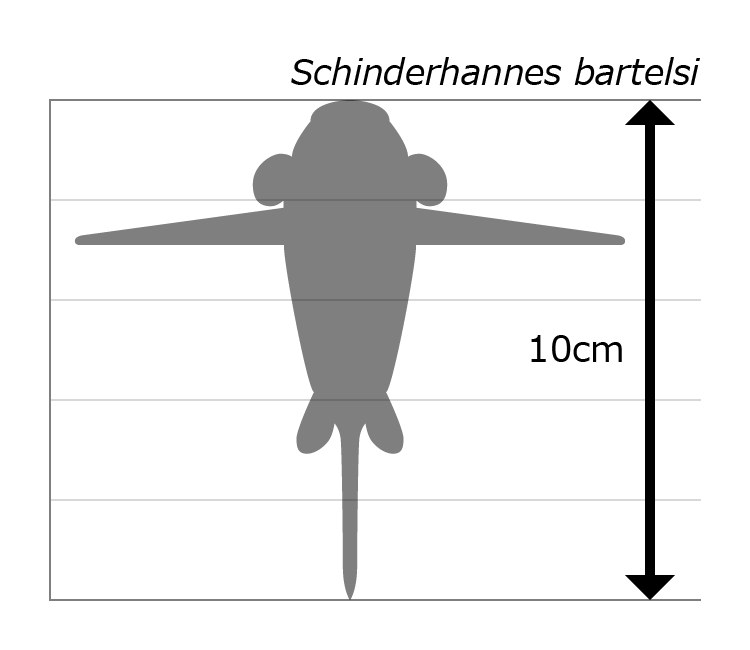
Approximate size of the animal

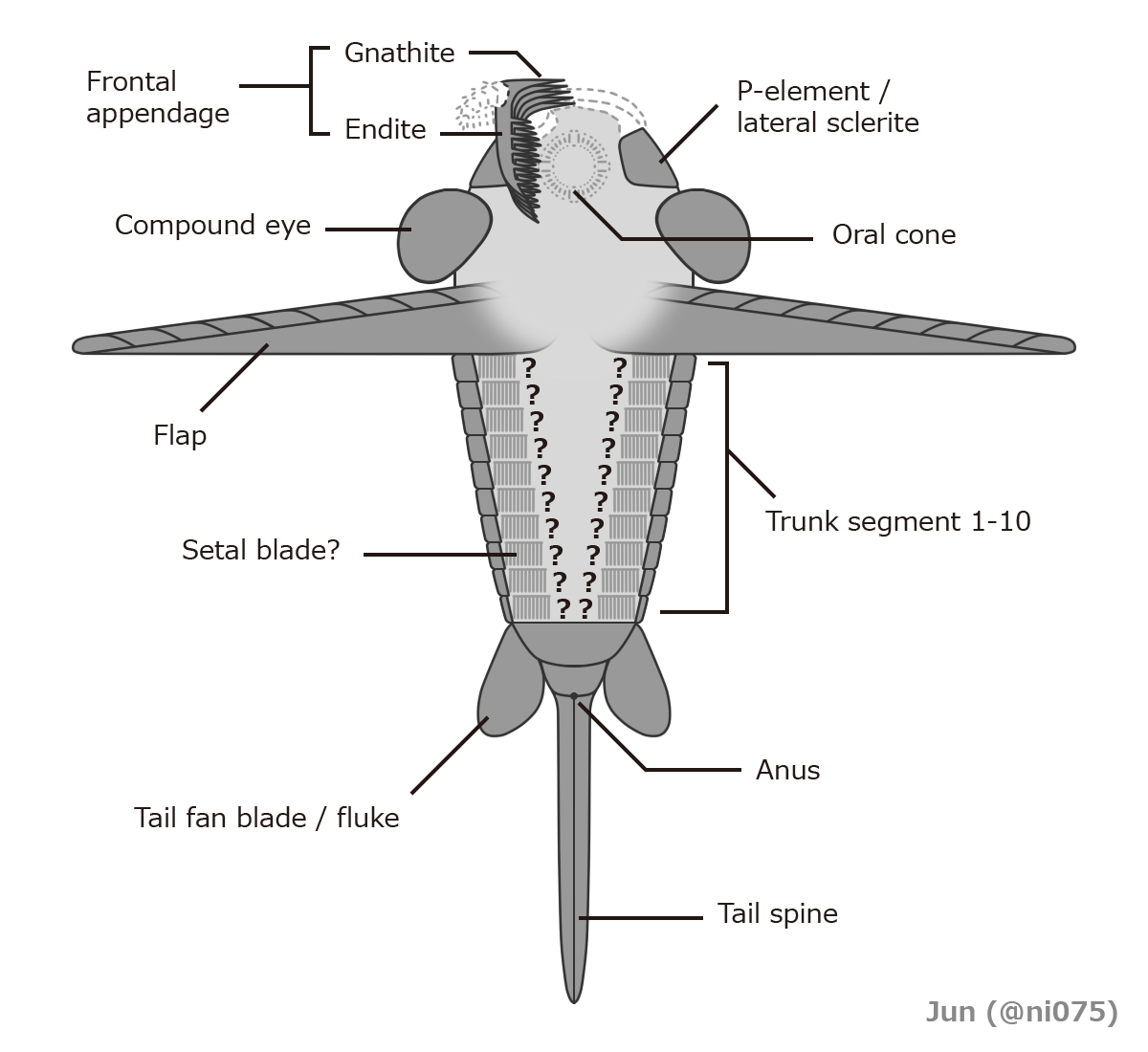
Ventral (underside) morphology of Schinderhannes bartelsi based on the reinterpretations from late 2010s.

=== Head ===
Like other radiodonts, the head bears a pair of spiny frontal appendages, a radially-arranged ventral mouthpart (oral cone), and a pair of large lateral compound eyes. Detailed morphology of the frontal appendages and oral cone are equivocal due to the limited preservation, but the former represent typical hurdiid features (e.g. subequal blade-like endites). The eyes were in a relatively anterior (forward) position in contrast to other hurdiids. There are traces of lateral structures originally thought to be the shaft regions of frontal appendages, which may rather represent P-elements (lateral sclerites) as seen in other radiodonts.

=== Body and limbs ===
Schinderhannes is about 9.8 cm (3.9 in) long in full body length, though 6.8 cm (2.7 in) long if excluding the telson. The boundary of head and trunk ('neck') was broad with a pair of long, ventrally-protruding flaps. The trunk compose of 12 body segments indicated by soft dorsal cuticle (originally thought to be rigid tergites). The first 10 segments possess pairs of striated structures originally interpreted as biramous (branched) ventral flaps, but later investigations from other radiodonts (e.g. Lyrarapax) suggest it may rather represent setal blades (dorsal gill-like structures of radiodont) and flap muscles. The 11th segment bears another pair of shorter, rounded flaps. The final segment lacking appendages and terminated with a long, spine-like telson. A ventral anus located immediately before the telson.

== Ecology ==
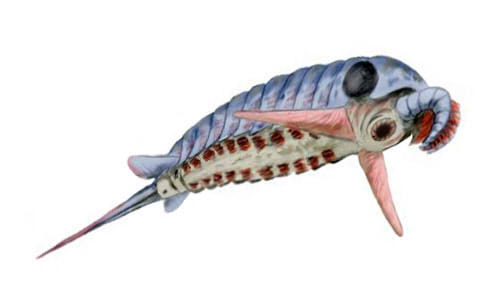
Life restoration based on information in the 2009 description

The preserved contents of its digestive tract are similar to those of other predatory arthropods, and this lifestyle is supported by the raptorial nature of the spiny frontal appendages and the size of the eyes. Schinderhannes may have been an active swimmer (nekton), propelling itself with the long flaps attached to its head, and using its shorter flaps on the 11th segment to steer. These flaps presumably derived from the lateral flaps of Cambrian radiodonts that used lobes along their sides to swim, but lacked the specializations as seen in Schinderhannes.

== Classification ==
As an Early Devonian radiodont, the discovery of Schinderhannes was significant for extending the known range of the group, since the latest definitive radiodonts were only known from the Early Ordovician, at least 66 million years before. This underlined the utility of lagerstätten like the Hunsrück Slate, as the exceptionally preserved fossil horizons may be the only available opportunity to observe non-mineralised forms.

The discovery of Schinderhannes has also prompted novel hypothesis about the classification of basal arthropods. One classification scheme has Schinderhannes sister to the euarthropods (crown or 'true' arthropods) instead of other radiodonts, based on the characters which interpreted to be euarthropod-like (e.g. sclerotized tergite, biramous appendage). This would mean that the euarthropod lineage evolved from a paraphyletic grade of radiodonts, and that the group of basal arthropods with 'great/frontal appendages' are not a natural grouping, and the biramous appendages of arthropods may then have arisen through fusion of radiodont lateral flaps and gills. However, this scenario had been challenged by later investigations, as the putative euarthropod-like features were questioned to be rather radiodont-like characters (e.g. soft trunk cuticle, setal blades and paired flap muscles). Phylogenetic analysis has repeatedly placed Schinderhannes within the radiodont family Hurdiidae.

Some researchers have remained skeptical of its taxonomic identity, questioning whether it is a hurdiid. In 2021, Zhu and colleagues argued that while the frontal appendages resemble those of radiodonts, the trunk anatomy of Schinderhannes is significantly different from the typical radiodont body plan, indicating that the hurdiid assignment should remain questionable before intermediate forms were discovered. In 2023, Potin and Daley suggested restudy of the material should be done to confirm with certainty its classification within Hurdiidae. Further studies such as those from Moysiuk and Caron in 2025 have subsequently recovered it as a basal hurdiid.
