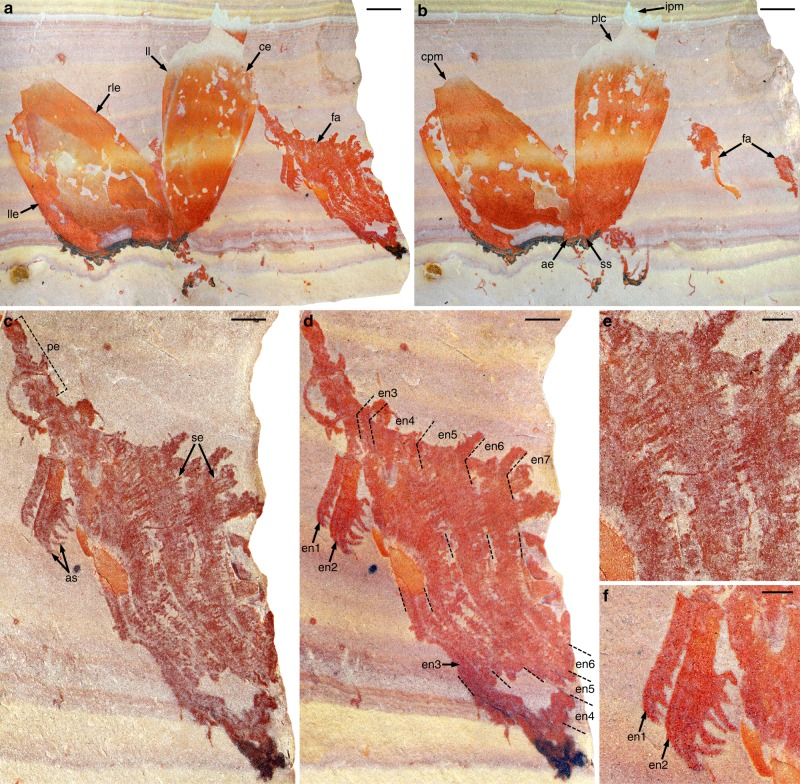
- Fossil specimens of Pahvantia hastata

Scientific classification
- Kingdom: Animalia
- Stem group: Arthropoda
- Class: †Dinocaridida
- Order: †Radiodonta
- Family: †Hurdiidae
- Subfamily: †Hurdiinae
- Genus: †Pahvantia; Robison & Richards, 1981

Type species
- Pahvantia hastata Robison & Richards, 1981

= Pahvantia =

Pahvantia Temporal range: Drumian

Extinct genus of radiodonts

Pahvantia is an extinct genus of hurdiid radiodont from the Cambrian period. It is known by a single species, Pahvantia hastata, described from Wheeler Shale and Marjum Formation in Utah. Although it was once considered as a filter feeder based on the large number of putative setae on the frontal appendage, these structures were later interpreted as fossil material of the "trunk" section.

== Description ==
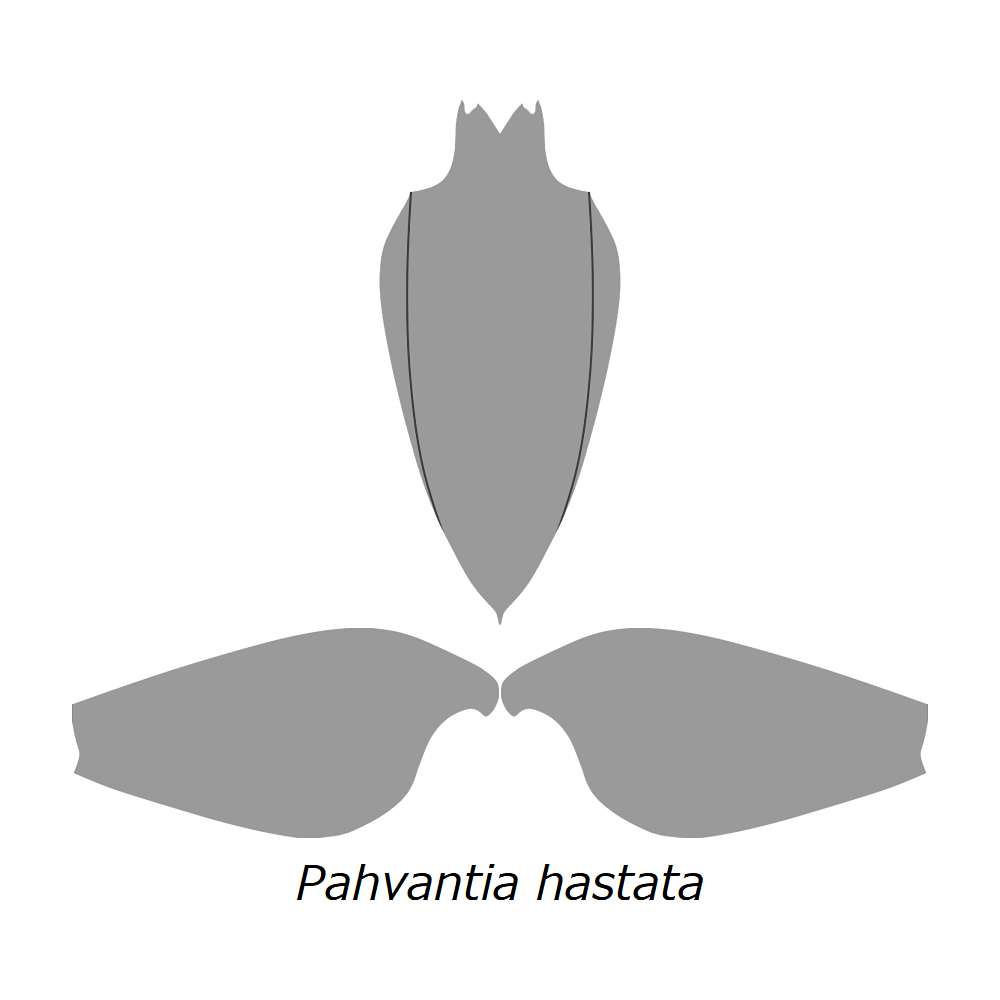
Head sclerites

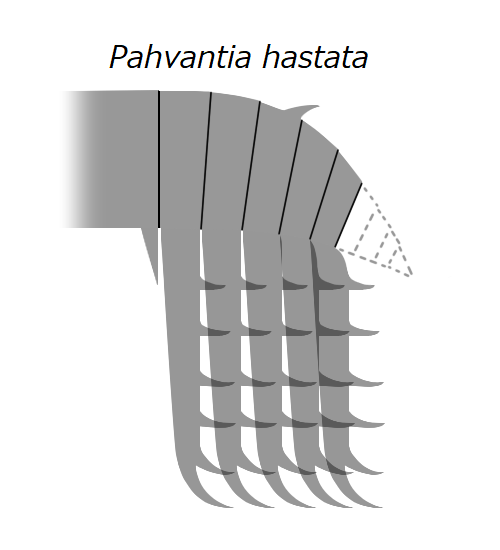
Frontal appendage

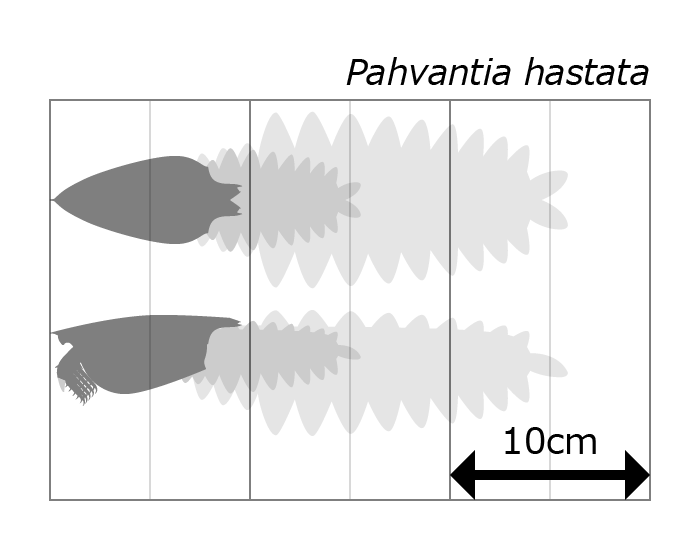
Size estimation

Pahvantia is named after the Pahvant people of western Utah. It was originally described as a possible arthropod of unknown affinity (evolutionary relatives). One specimen was described as a specimen of Proboscicaris agnosta, which was originally interpreted as a bivalved arthropod, but is now considered as the head sclerites of Hurdia.

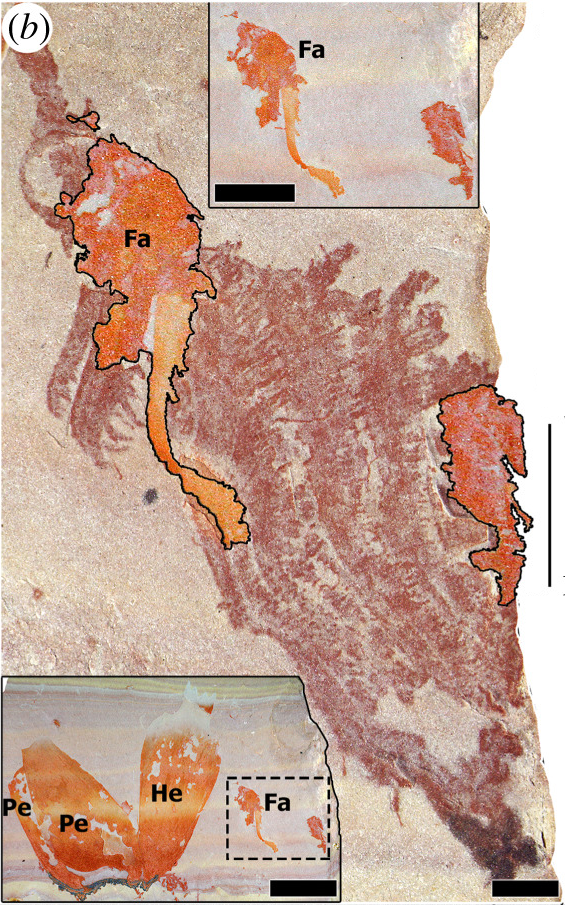
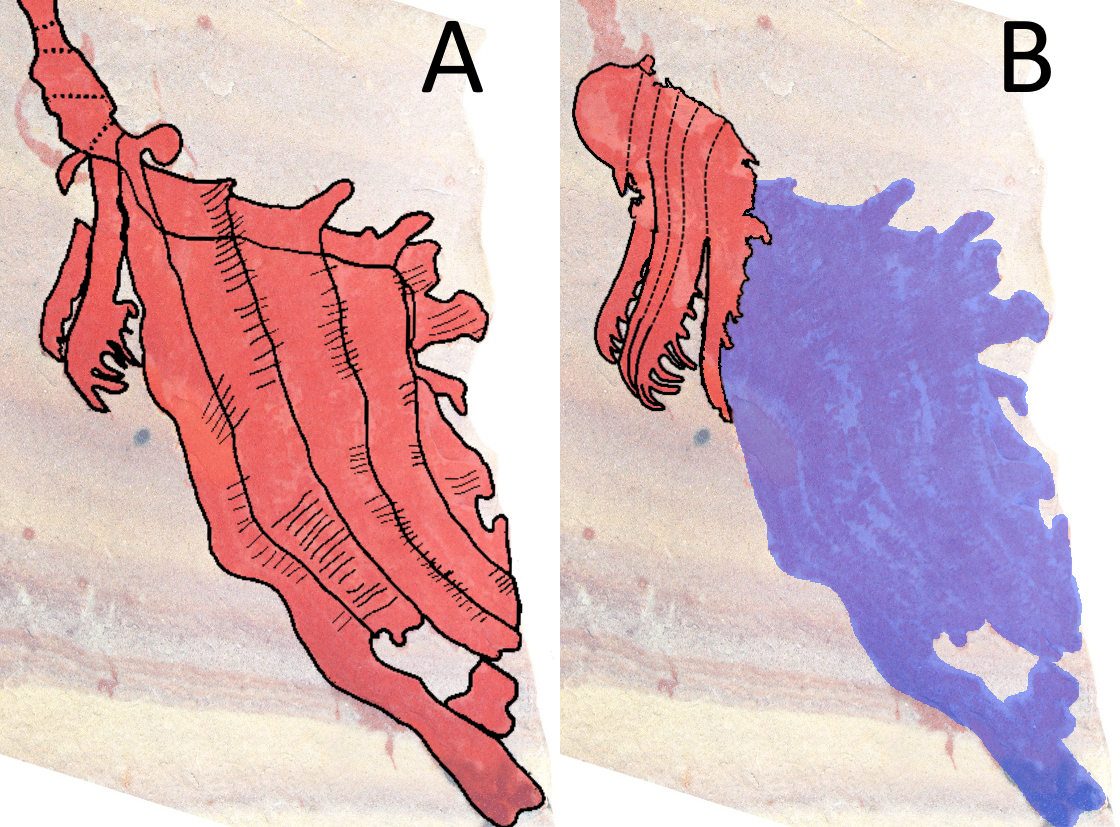
Analysis of KUMIP 314089. (Note: Top: counterslab elements overlaid on KUMIP 314089 showing supposed podomeres; Bottom: interpretations of KUMIP 314089; (A) whole fossil as filter-feeding frontal appendage, (B) a shorter Hurdia-like frontal appendage with trunk elements such as setal blades)

Pahvantia is a relatively small radiodont with an estimated length between 14.4–24 centimetres (5.7–9.4 in). Similar to most other hurdiids, Pahvantia had a large dorsal head sclerite (H-element), and it was more than twice as long than it is wide. Based on the frontal appendage, its morphology is most close to that of Hurdia, although the sclerites' forms are different enough (diagnostic) to consider Pahvantia a distinct genus.

=== Interpretation of frontal appendage ===
Lerosey-Aubril and Pates (2018) considered the fossil specimen KUMIP 314089 as the frontal appendage of the animal, with a multitude of long hair-like structures tentatively interpreted as setae. It was interpreted that frontal appendage had two different types of endites; two proximal short ones with robust, plate-like structures of different widths, and five apparently unpaired endites that are two to three times wider and around three times longer, with anterior margins fringed by numerous setae. However, Moysiuk and Caron (2019) questioned this interpretation, arguing that unnatural fossil preservation against flexibility of structures, no differentiation between the supposed podomeres and endites interpreted by Lerosey-Aubril and Pates (2018), and what would be much bigger frontal appendages compared to other hurdiids. It was considered that the morphology of the "frontal appendage" shows several bands of lamellae, possibly representing disarticulated endites. Due to preservation status, researchers considered the morphology of the frontal appendage to be uncertain. In 2021, Moysiuk and Caron reinterpreted the morphology of Pahvantia hastata by comparison with Titanokorys; through comparison of the part and counterpart of specimen KUMIP 314089, they found that these actually show a Hurdia-like frontal appendage, with "two proximal short endites with different widths". Lerosey-Aubril and Pates' interpretation (2018) was of one endite and three overlapped endites. The 2021 paper shows that the supposed "five endites with numerous setae" are more comparable to gill blades (setal blades) on the trunk segments.

== Palaeoecology ==
Pahvantia was originally interpreted as an example of suspension feeding radiodont taxa alongside Aegirocassis and Tamisiocaris, using the numerous setae on frontal appendage to capture microscopic food particles and plankton suspended in the water column. However, after the morphology of the frontal appendage was reinterpreted, it is now thought that Pahvantia probably had a nekto-benthic lifestyle; it may have captured larger prey living along or in the sediment, similar to what is thought for Hurdia, which had a comparable frontal appendage anatomy.
