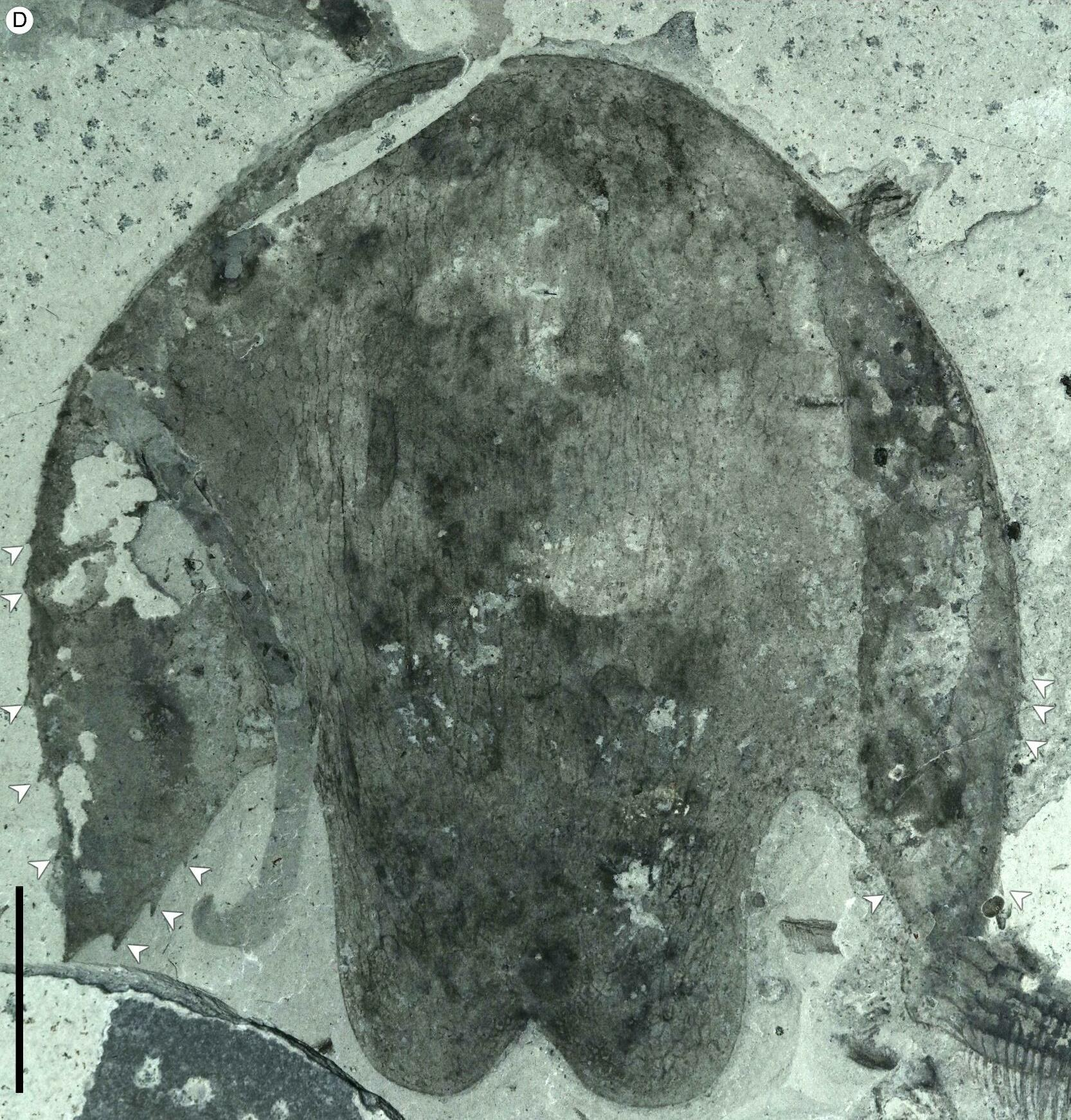
- Fossil of a Cambroraster head sclerite (ROMIP 65079)
- Video animation

Scientific classification
- Kingdom: Animalia
- Phylum: Arthropoda
- Class: †Dinocaridida
- Order: †Radiodonta
- Family: †Hurdiidae
- Subfamily: †Hurdiinae
- Genus: †Cambroraster

Type species
- Cambroraster falcatus Moysiuk & Caron, 2019

Species
- Cambroraster falcatus

= Cambroraster =

Cambroraster Temporal range: Mid Cambrian: Chengjiang–Burgess shale

Extinct genus of radiodonts

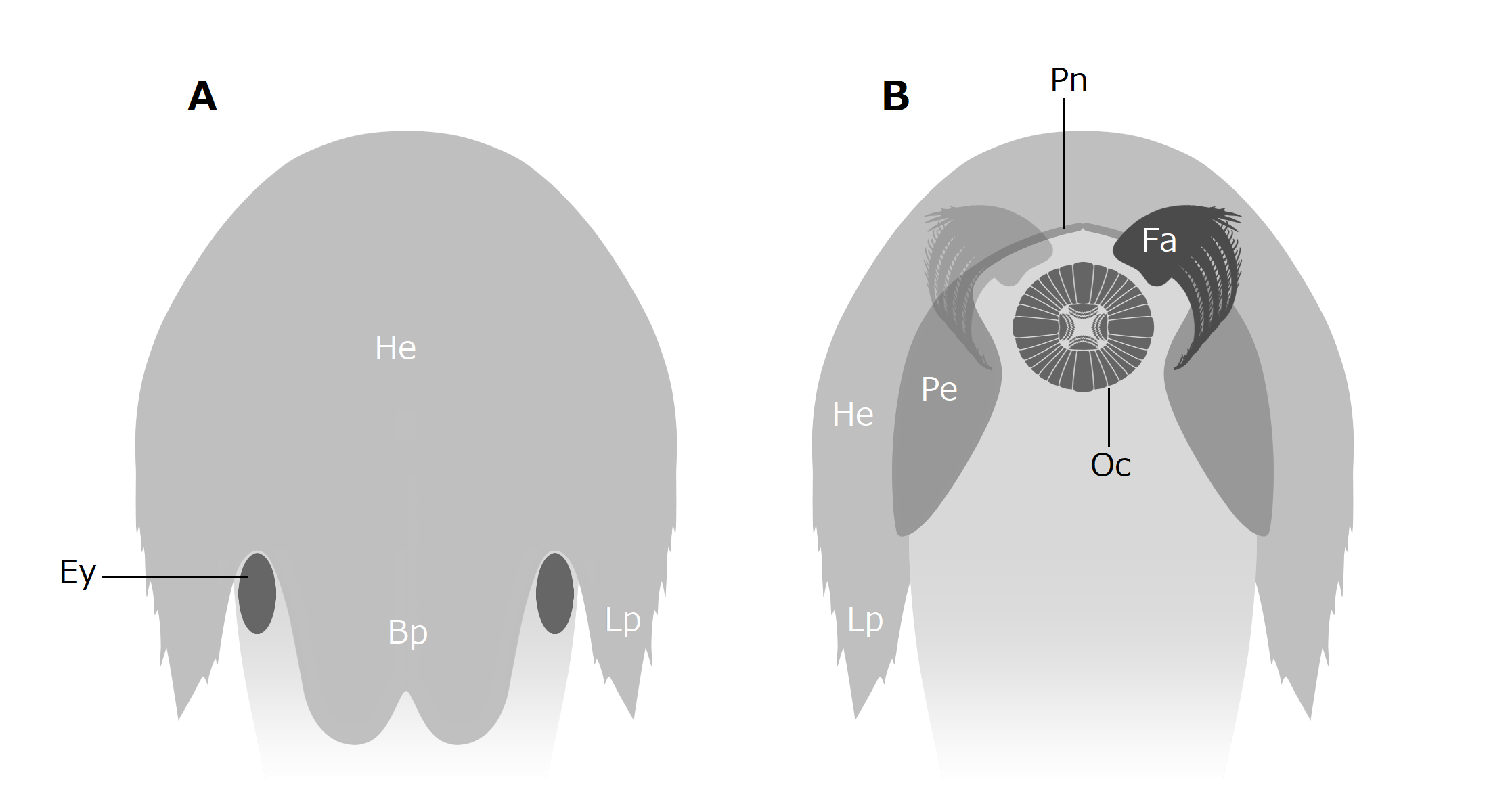
Reconstruction of the head region of Cambroraster falcatus. A: Dorsal view, B: Ventral view, Ey: Eye, Fa: Frontal appendage, He:H-element, Bp: Bilobate posterior region, Lp: Posterolateral process, Oc: Oral cone, Pe: P-element, Pn: P-element neck

Cambroraster is an extinct monotypic genus of hurdiid radiodont, dating to the middle Cambrian, and represented by the single formally described species Cambroraster falcatus. Hundreds of specimens were found in the Burgess Shale, and described in 2019. A large animal (for its era) at up to 30 centimetres (12 in) (but not as long as Titanokorys at 50 centimetres (20 in)), it is characterized by a significantly enlarged horseshoe-shaped dorsal carapace (H-element), and presumably fed by sifting through the sediment with its well-developed tooth plates (oral cone) and short frontal appendages with hooked spines. Nicknamed the "spaceship" fossil when first found, for the way its dorsal carapace resembles the fictional Millennium Falcon, the specific epithet falcatus in its scientific name is a nod to that resemblance.

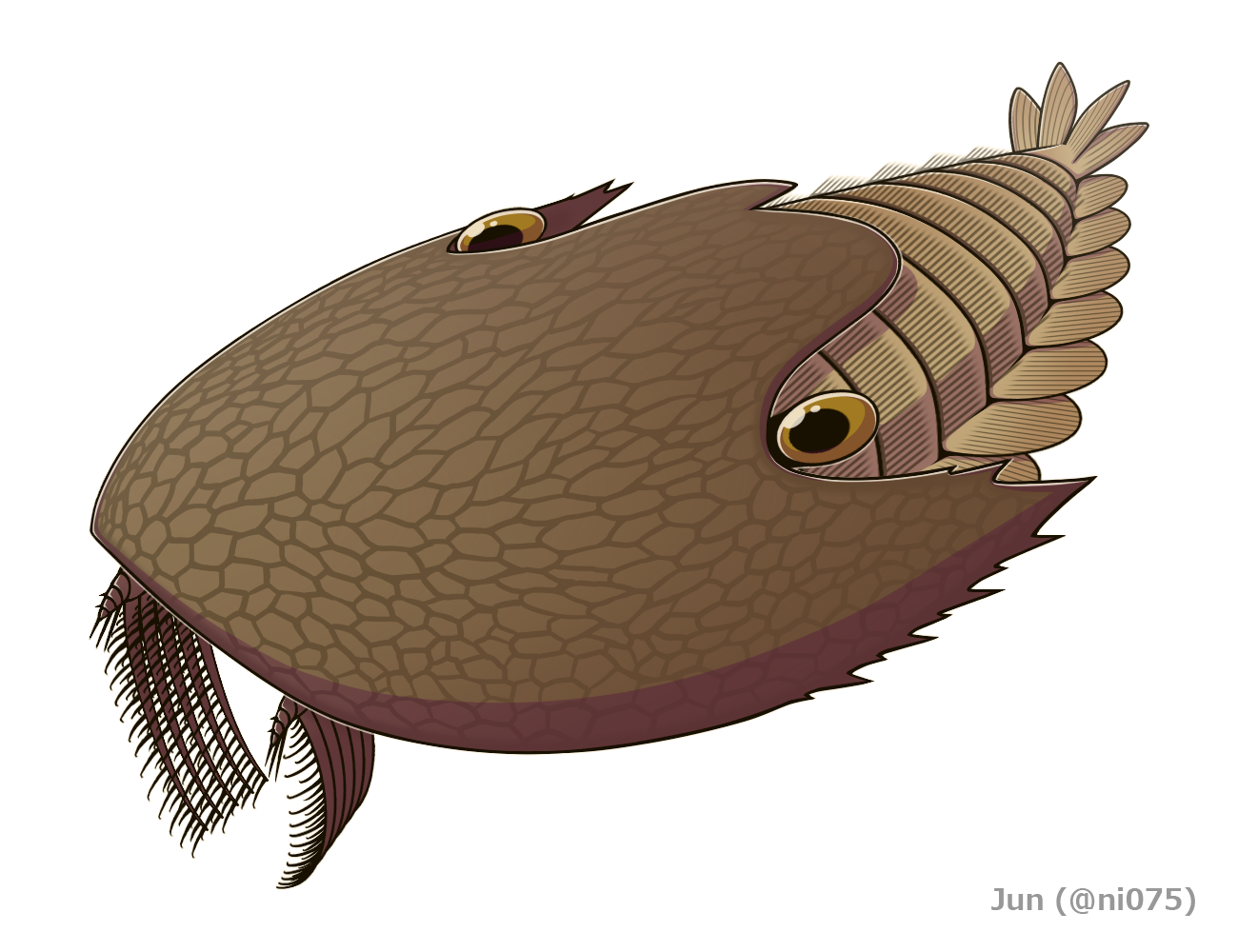
Reconstruction

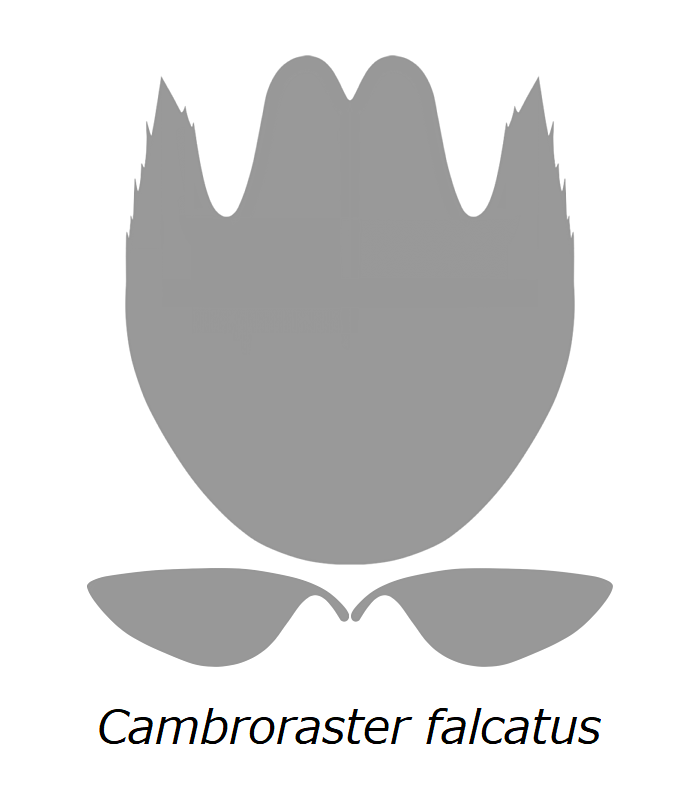
Head sclerites

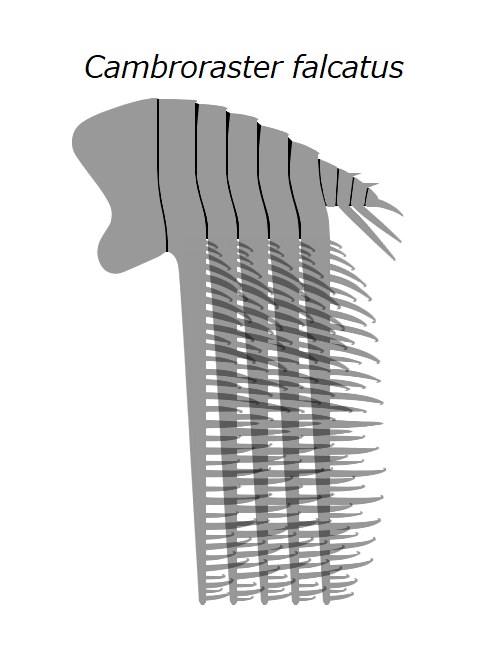
Frontal appendage

Movement range of the frontal appendage

A second species of Cambroraster is known from the Chengjiang Biota of South China, making it the first uncontroversial hurdiid from the Cambrian of China. This species is known only from a juvenile dorsal carapace, so it was not given a specific name.

Although originally suggested to have used its frontal appendages to sift sediment for prey, a later study by different authors suggested that it may have been a filter feeder instead.

== See also ==
- Paleobiota of the Burgess Shale
- List of Chengjiang Biota species by phylum
