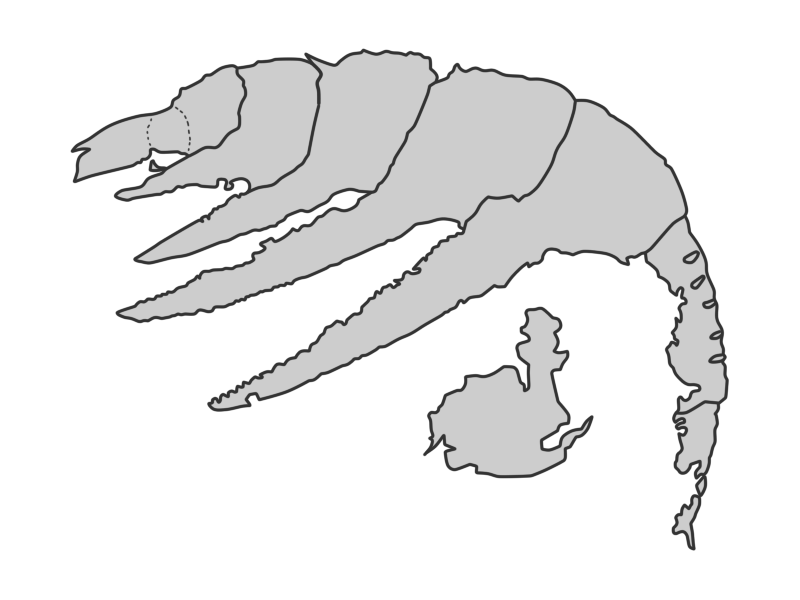
- Interpretive drawing of holotype specimen of P. infercambriensis

Scientific classification
- Kingdom: Animalia
- Stem group: Arthropoda
- Class: †Dinocaridida
- Order: †Radiodonta
- Family: †Hurdiidae
- Genus: †Peytoia
- Species: †P. infercambriensis

Binomial name
- †Peytoia infercambriensis (Lendzion, 1975)

Synonyms
- Cassubia infercambriensis (Lendzion, 1975); Pomerania infercambriensis Lendzion, 1975 (preoccupied)

= Peytoia infercambriensis =

Peytoia infercambriensis Temporal range: Cambrian Stage 3

Extinct species of arthropod

Peytoia infercambriensis is a species of hurdiid radiodont in the genus Peytoia.

P. infercambriensis is the geologically oldest known radiodont; its remains date to the third age of the Cambrian. The type and only known specimen, a partial appendage, was found in a core sample from a borehole nearly five kilometers deep in northern Poland. P. infercambriensis was previously regarded as belonging to a separate genus, Cassubia, named after the historical region of Kashubia in which the specimen was found, but Cassubia is now considered a junior synonym of Peytoia.

== History of study ==
=== Discovery and naming ===
The holotype—and only—specimen was recovered from the Kościerzyna borehole, in the Cambrian Stage 3 aged Zawiszyn Formation. It was found in the Fallotaspis Zone making it older than the Chengjiang biota. It was described by Kazimiera Lendzion in 1975 and given the name Pomerania infercambriensis, in reference to its Lower Cambrian provenance and the Pomerania region in which the specimen was found. In her initial description, Lendzion interpreted the fossil as preserving 11 thoracic segments and a chelicera of a Leanchoilia-like arthropod. In 1977, Lendzion discovered that the name Pomerania had already been used by an ammonoid, so she renamed the genus Cassubia, after the Kaszuby region of where the specimen was found.

=== Reinterpretations ===
In 1988, Jerzy Dzik and Kazimiera Lendzion reinterpreted the specimen as representing the appendage of an anomalocaridid. They interpreted both the "thorax" and "chelicera" as both parts of a single elongate appendage, similar to that of Anomalocaris. Some researchers, such as Simon Conway Morris, suggested that it may even be synonymous with Anomalocaris itself. In 1995, E. L. Bousfield proposed a taxonomic arrangement of early arthropods in which Cassubia and Anomalocaris were assigned to the same class, Anomalocaridea, but Cassubia was given a subclass of its own, Cassubiata. Though recognizing Cassubia as related to Anomalocaris, Bousfield followed Lendzion's original interpretation of the specimen as comprising a short appendage and long body. When the radiodont Tamisiocaris was discovered by Allison Daley and John Peel in 2010, they took note of its apparent similarity to Cassubia infercambriensis, as it had been interpreted by Dzik and Lendzion. In 2012, Joachim Haug et al. interpreted Cassubia as similar to the megacheiran Occacaris.

These diverse interpretations led Alison Daley and David Legg to restudy the original specimen. They concluded that the specimen did indeed consist of both a body and appendage, but that they did not belong to the same animal. Rather, the body was that of an indeterminate arthropod, while the appendage was that of a radiodont similar to Peytoia nathorsti. As such, they synonymized Cassubia with Peytoia, making the new combination Peytoia infercambriensis.

== Description ==
Peytoia infercambriensis differed from its close relative Peytoia nathorsti in several characteristics of its frontal appendage, the only part of its anatomy known. The ventral spines are only half as wide as the associated podomere, and are estimated to have borne approximately 24 tightly-spaced auxiliary spines. The endites decrease sharply in length, such that the distalmost endite is only a quarter the length of the proximalmost.

== Paleoecology ==
The Zawiszyn Formation, in which the only known specimen of Peytoia infercambriensis was found, dates back to the third age of the Cambrian, making P. infercambriensis the oldest known radiodont. P. infercambriensis predates the earliest known mineralized trilobites from Poland, but the trilobite-like nektaspid Liwia is known from close to the same layer as P. infercambriensis. The enigmatic small shelly fossil Mobergella is abundant in the rock layers where Liwia and P. infercambriensis are found. The depositional environment was a shallower-water environment than typical of places with Burgess Shale-type preservation.
