= Angarella =

Scientific classification
- Kingdom: Animalia
- Phylum: Brachiopoda (?)
- Order: †Kirengellida
- Family: †Kirengellidae
- Genus: †Angarella

Extinct genus of problematic fossils

Angarella is an early palaeozoic genus of problematic fossils, long held to belong to the molluscs based on supposed similarities in its musculature to that of hyoliths (now known to be brachiopod relatives) and mobergellids, but now considered to represent a brachiopod based on its calcitic mineralogy and paired symmetrical valves.

Its dorsal valve is low and conical, whereas its ventral is flat and follows the contours of the substrate, indicating a cementing habit. The dorsal valve bears a series of symmetrical muscle impressions, forming a ring concentric with the edge of the shell. The ventral valve has a pair of internal depressions.
