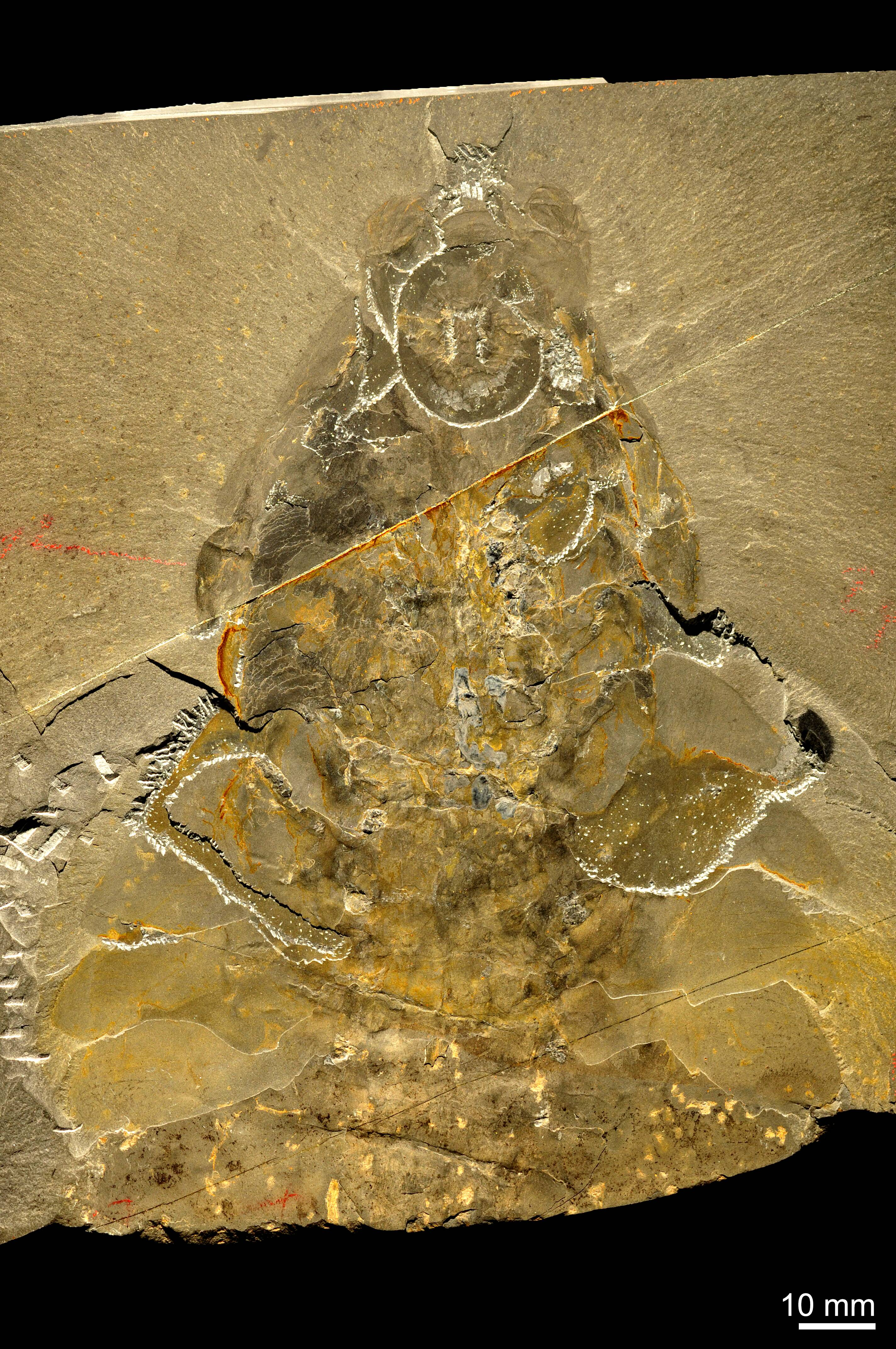
- Fossil specimen of Peytoia nathorsti
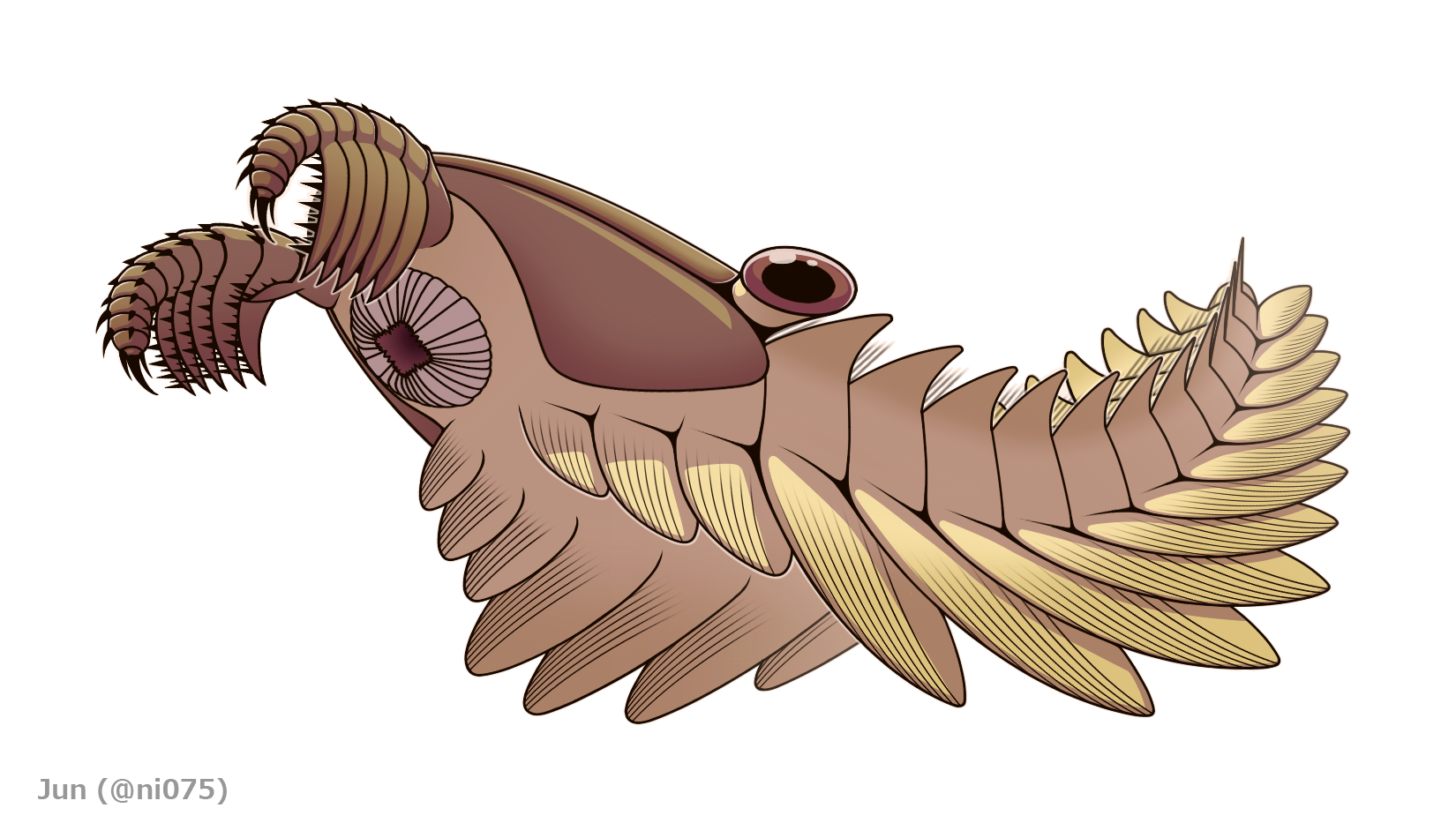
- Reconstruction of P. nathorsti

Scientific classification
- Kingdom: Animalia
- Stem group: Arthropoda
- Class: †Dinocaridida
- Order: †Radiodonta
- Family: †Hurdiidae
- Genus: †Peytoia; Walcott, 1911

Type species
- †Peytoia nathorsti Walcott, 1911

Species
- †Peytoia nathorsti Walcott, 1911; †Peytoia infercambriensis (Lendzion, 1975)

Synonyms
- Laggania Walcott, 1911; Pomerania Lendzion, 1975 (preoccupied); Cassubia Lendzion, 1977

= Peytoia =

Peytoia Temporal range: Cambrian Stage 3–Miaolingian

Extinct genus of radiodont

Peytoia is a genus of hurdiid radiodont, an early diverging order of stem-group arthropods, that lived in the Cambrian period, containing two species, Peytoia nathorsti from the Miaolingian of Canada and Peytoia infercambriensis from Poland, dating to Cambrian Stage 3. Its two frontal appendages had long bristle-like spines, it had no fan tail, and its short stalked eyes were behind its large head.

108 specimens of Peytoia are known from the Greater Phyllopod bed, where they comprise 0.21% of the community.

Peytoia nathorsti and its junior synonym Laggania cambria played a major role in the discovery of the radiodont body plan. Initially interpreted as a jellyfish and a sea cucumber respectively, they were eventually shown to be the mouthparts and body of a single animal, which bore Anomalocaris-like appendages.

Peytoia infercambriensis is the geologically oldest known radiodont species.

== Classification ==
Peytoia belongs to the clade Hurdiidae, and is closely related to the contemporary genus Hurdia.

Peytoia contains two named species: Peytoia nathorsti, the type species, from the Burgess Shale of Canada and the Wheeler and Marjum Formations of the United States, and Peytoia infercambriensis from the Zawiszyn Formation of Poland. Another species of Peytoia may be present in the Burgess Shale, represented by a single frontal appendage from the Tulip Beds locality. A specimen regarded as Peytoia cf. nathorsti is known from the Balang Formation of China.

== History ==
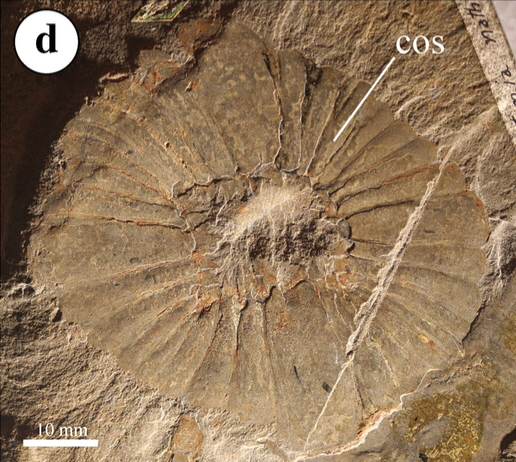
Holotype oral cone of Peytoia nathorsti

The history of Peytoia is entangled with that of "Laggania" and Anomalocaris: all three were initially identified as isolated body parts and only later discovered to belong to one type of animal. This was due in part to their makeup of a mixture of mineralized and unmineralized body parts; the oral cone (mouth) and frontal appendage were considerably harder and more easily fossilized than the delicate body.

The first was a detached frontal appendage of Anomalocaris, described by Joseph Frederick Whiteaves in 1892 as a phyllocarid crustacean, because it resembled the abdomen of that taxon. The first fossilized oral cone was discovered by Charles Doolittle Walcott, who mistook it for a jellyfish and placed it in the genus Peytoia. In the same paper, Walcott described a poorly-preserved body specimen as Laggania; he interpreted it as a holothurian (sea cucumber). In 1978, Simon Conway Morris noted that the mouthparts of Laggania were identical to Peytoia, but interpreted this as indicating that Laggania was a composite fossil of Peytoia and the sponge Corralio undulata. Later, while clearing what he thought was an unrelated specimen, Harry B. Whittington removed a layer of covering stone to discover the unequivocally connected arm thought to be a phyllocarid abdomen and the oral cone thought to be a jellyfish. Whittington linked the two species, but it took several more years for researchers to realize that the continuously juxtaposed Peytoia, Laggania and frontal appendage represented one enormous creature. Laggania and Peytoia were named in the same publication, but Conway Morris selected Peytoia as the valid name in 1978, which makes it the valid name according to International Commission on Zoological Nomenclature rules.

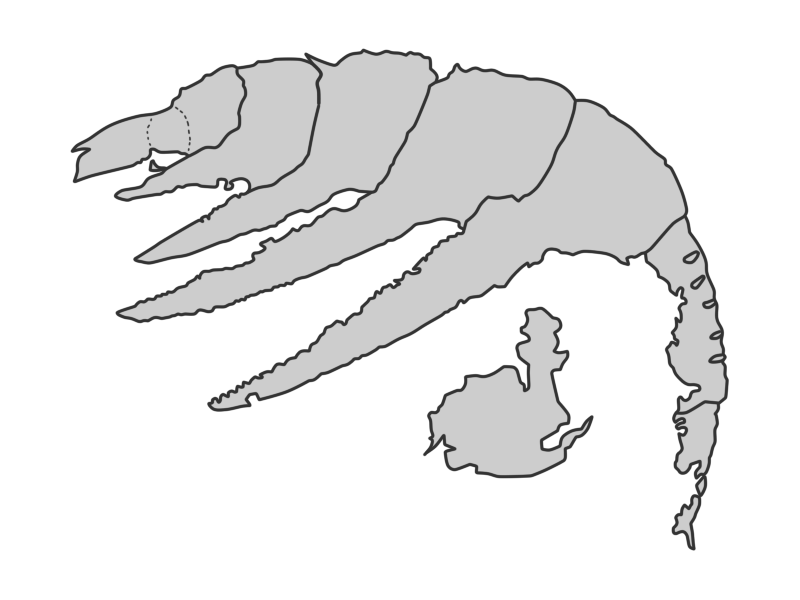
Only specimen of Peytoia infercambriensis

The discovery that Anomalocaris, Laggania, and Peytoia represented parts of a single type of animal led to the synonymization of the three genera, with Peytoia nathorsti reclassified as Anomalocaris nathorsti. Peytoia nathorsti was subsequently considered a junior synonym of Anomalocaris canadensis, while Laggania cambria became recognized as a distinct genus and species again, but in 2012 it was determined that Anomalocaris canadensis had an oral cone with only three large plates, unlike that of Laggania cambria and Peytoia nathorsti with four, and Peytoia was once again recognized as valid, with Laggania its junior synonym.

A second species, Peytoia infercambriensis, was named in 1975 as Pomerania infercambriensis. Its discoverer, Kazimiera Lendzion, interpreted it as a member of Leanchoiliidae, a family which now known as part of the unrelated megacheirans (great appendage arthropods). It was subsequently renamed Cassubia infercambriensis because the name Pomerania had already been used for an ammonoid. C. infercambriensis was later recognized as a radiodont. It was later determined that the specimen was a composite of a radiodont frontal appendage and the body of an unknown arthropod. Due to the close similarity of the appendage to Peytoia nathorsti, C. infercambriensis was reassigned to Peytoia.

== Description ==
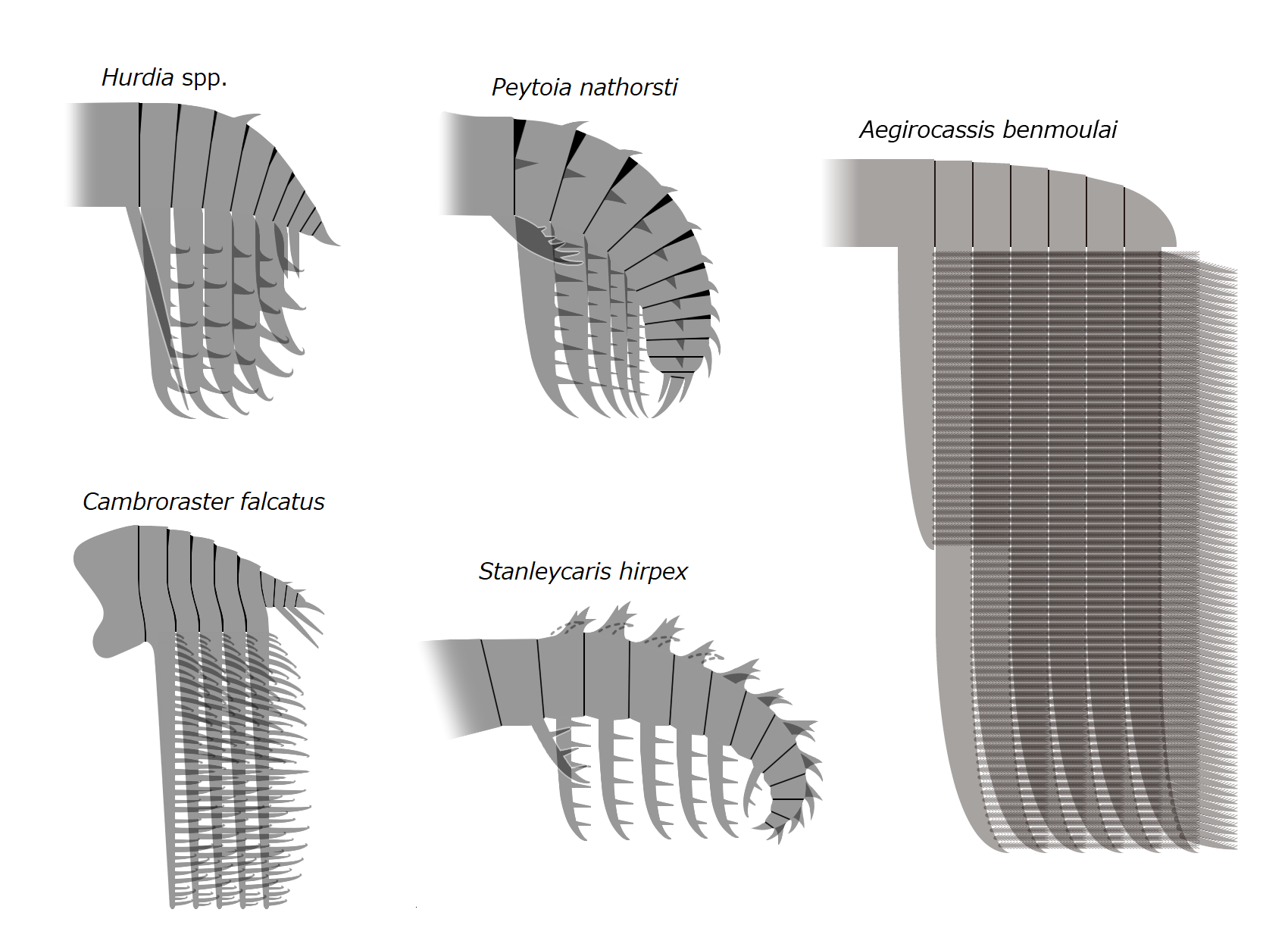
Comparison of the frontal appendages of Peytoia with other members of Hurdiidae

Morphology and movement range of the frontal appendage of Peytoia nathorsti

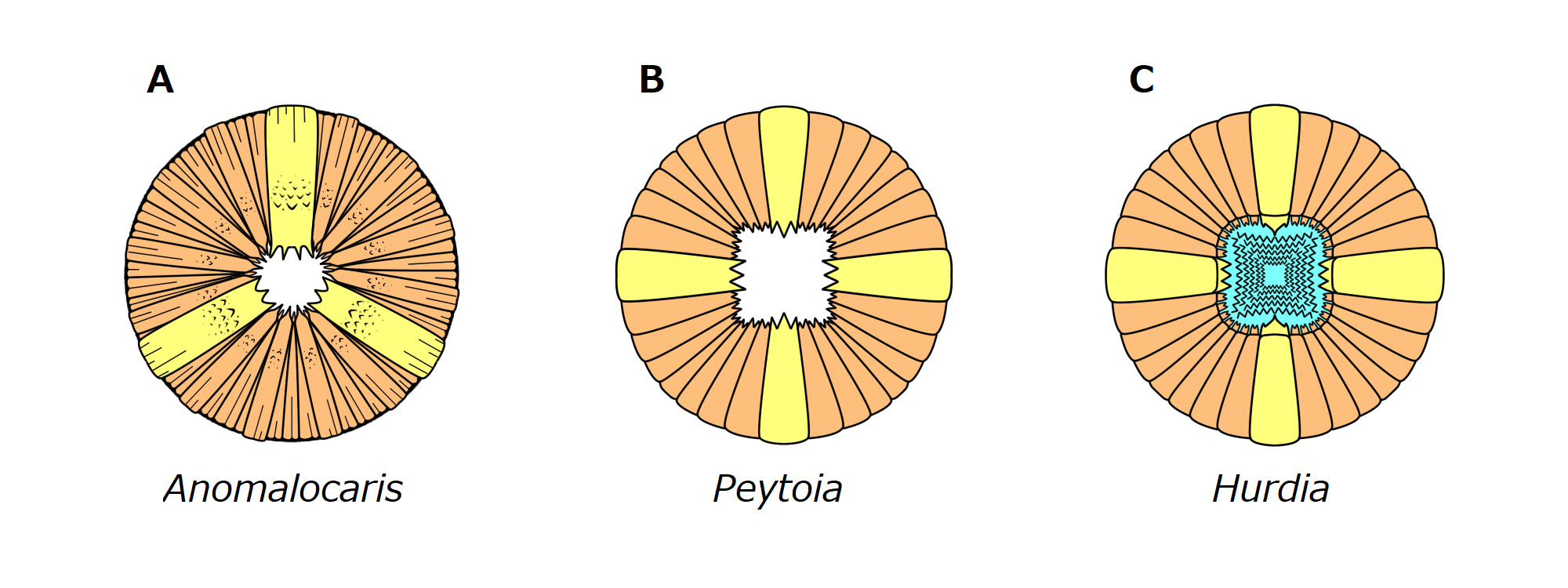
Oral cone of Peytoia nathorsti in comparison to Anomalocaris and Hurdia

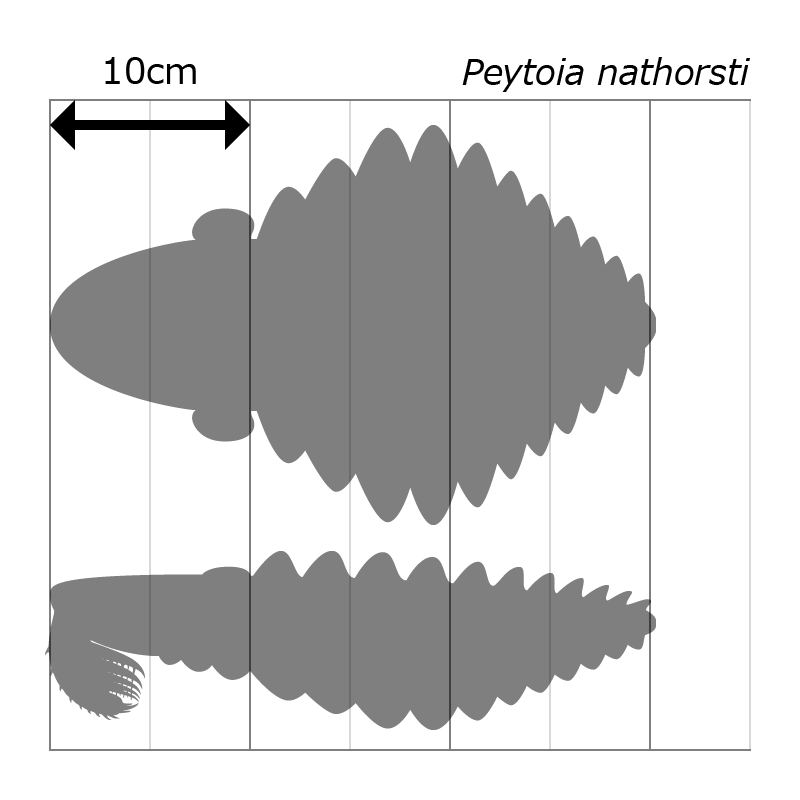
Size diagram

P. nathorsti had body length about 28.7–30.3 cm (11.3–11.9 in). The oral cone of Peytoia nathorsti has four large plates, similar to Hurdia, as compared to three in Anomalocaris. However, unlike Hurdia, the oral cone of Peytoia lacks inner rows of spines. The frontal appendages have 13 podomeres in their distal part, as is typical and likely ancestral for radiodonts. Like other hurdiid radiodonts, the frontal appendages have five blade-like endites, which have short auxiliary spines. An intercalary podomere is present, separating the proximal and distal ends of the appendage. The appendages also have large medial spines, sometimes referred to as "gnathites", which face towards the opposite appendage. The trunk consists of 13 segments, which are associated with wide swimming flaps. Compared to Hurdia, Peytoia has less prominent setal blades.

== Phylogeny ==
Phylogenetic position of Peytoia within Radiodonta and Hurdiidae according to Moysiuk et al. 2025:

- Radiodonta
  - Echidnacaris briggsi
  - - Houcaris saron
    - - Innovatiocaris maotianshanensis
      - Anomalocaris canadensis
      - - - ?Houcaris magnabasis
          - - Shucaris ankylosskelos
            - - Ramskoeldia
              - Amplectobelua
        - - Laminacaris chimera
          - - Lyrarapax
            - Hurdiidae
              - Mosura fentoni
              - - Schinderhannes bartelsi
                - - - Stanleycaris hirpex
                    - Peytoia nathorsti
                  - - Aegirocassis benmoulai
                    - Hurdiinae
                      - - Hurdia victoria
                        - Hurdia triangulata
                      - - Pahvantia hastata
                        - - Cordaticaris striatus
                          - - Titanokorys gainesi
                            - Cambroraster falcatus

== Ecology ==
It has been proposed that the frontal appendages of Peytoia were used to sift sediment for prey, however, some authors have considered this unlikely due to the small size and irregular spacing of the auxiliary spines. It has been alternatively proposed that Peytoia was a predator, using its appendages to capture slow-moving, relatively large benthic prey.

== See also ==
- Paleobiota of the Burgess Shale
