= Canningella =

Canningella Temporal range: Late Devonian–Recent

Scientific classification
- Kingdom: Animalia
- Phylum: Porifera
- Class: Demospongiae
- Family: †Anthaspidellidae
- Genus: †Canningella; Rigby, 1986

Extinct genus of sponges

Canningella is an extinct genus of sponge in the family Anthaspidellidae. There are at least four described species in Canningella.

== Species ==
These four species belong to the genus Canningella:

- † Canningella expansa Rigby, 1986
- † Canningella interrupta Rigby, 1986
- † Canningella magnipora Rigby, 1986
- † Canningella obconica Rigby, 1986
