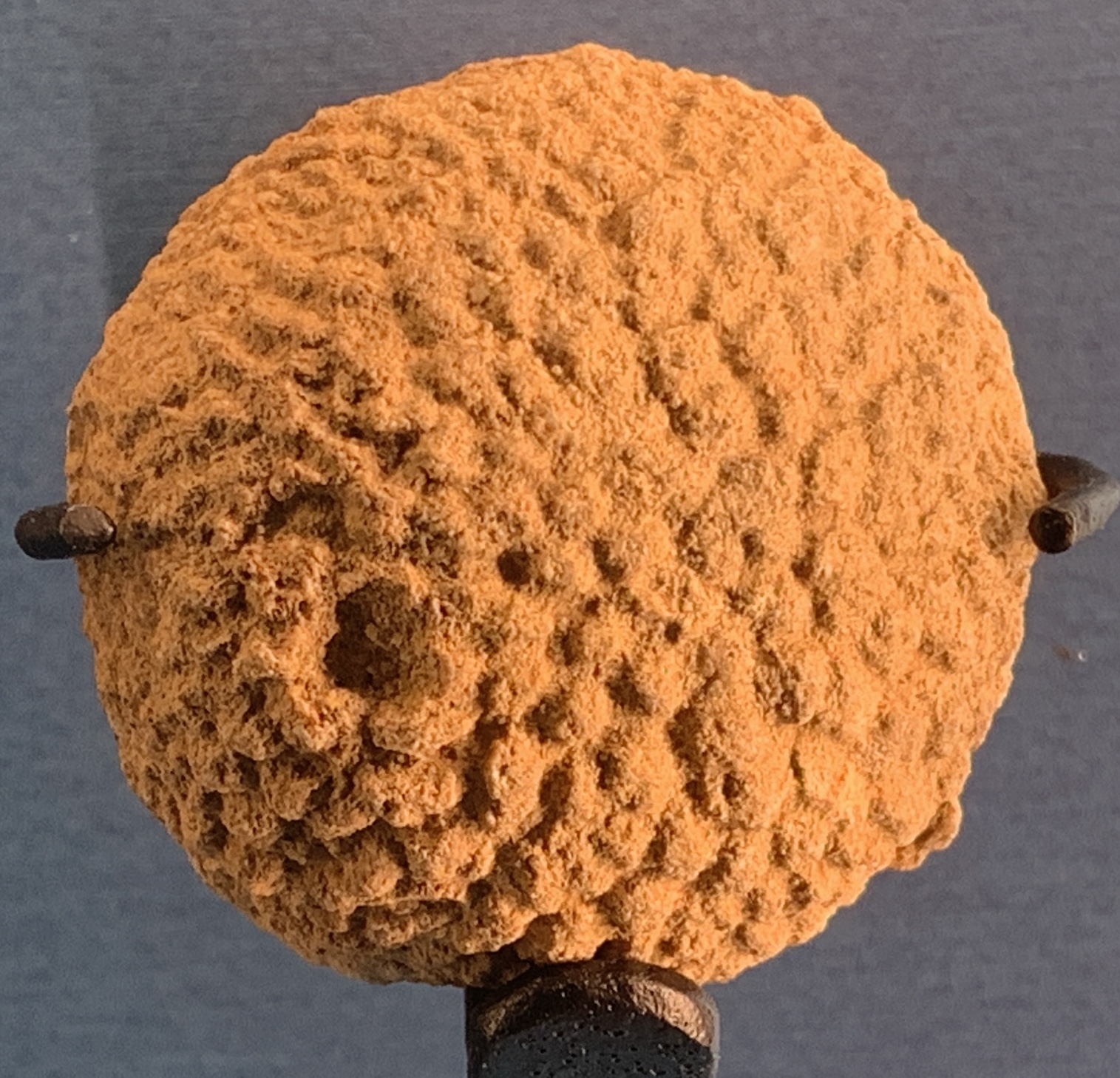
- Nevadacoelia wistae, from the early Ordovician of Nevada.

Scientific classification
- Domain: Eukaryota
- Kingdom: Animalia
- Phylum: Porifera
- Class: Demospongiae
- Suborder: †Orchocladina
- Family: †Anthaspidellidae; Miller, 1889

Genera
- Capsospongia; Rankenella; Calycocoelia; Zittelella; Rhopalocoelria Raymond and Okulitch, 1940; ?Eospongia (Billings, 1861; Raymond & Okulitch, 1940); ?Hudsonospongia (Raymond & Okulitch, 1940); ?Steliella (Hinde, 1889; Wilson, 1948); ?Zittelella (Ulrich & Everett, 1890)

= Anthaspidellidae =

Extinct family of sponges

Anthaspidellidae is an extinct family of sponges whose dendroclone spicules form ladder-like trabs.

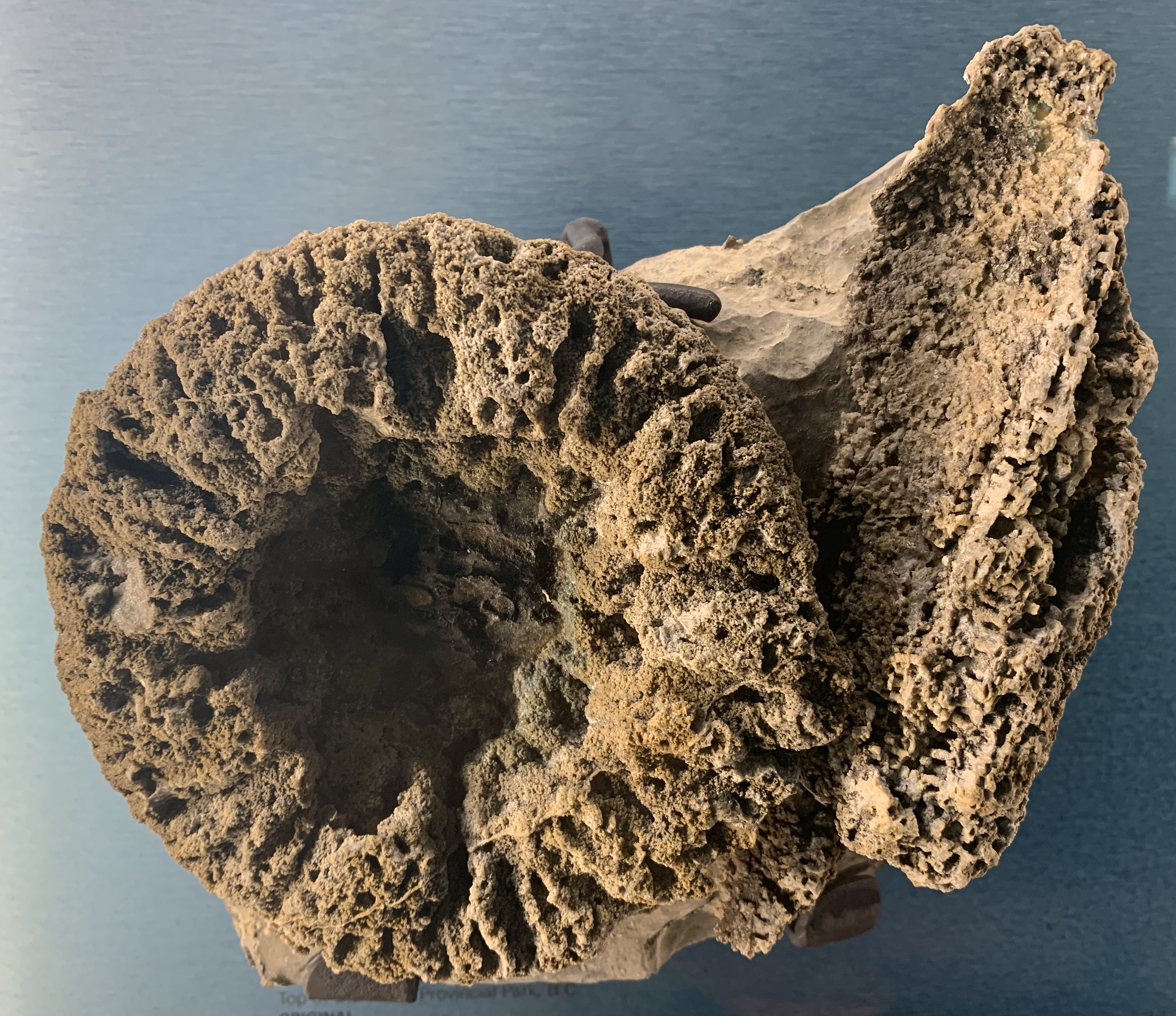
Hudsonospongia sp., late Ordovician, Beaverfoot Formation, Top Of the World Provincial Park, BC.
