= Trab =

Part of a sea sponge

A trab is a structural element within a sponge formed by the fusion of dendroclones.

In the Anthaspidellidae, when spicules (usually dendroclones) connect at their tips to form a ladder-like structure, trabs may be formed. Oxeas are sometimes employed in the central rod. Trabs have a feather-like structure, or may form rods.

Trabs are usually regularly spaced, usually at sub-millimetric intervals. Further dendroclones may interconnect adjacent trabs, forming ladder-like structures.

The presence and alignment of trabs is often related to the internal structure of canals within sponges.
