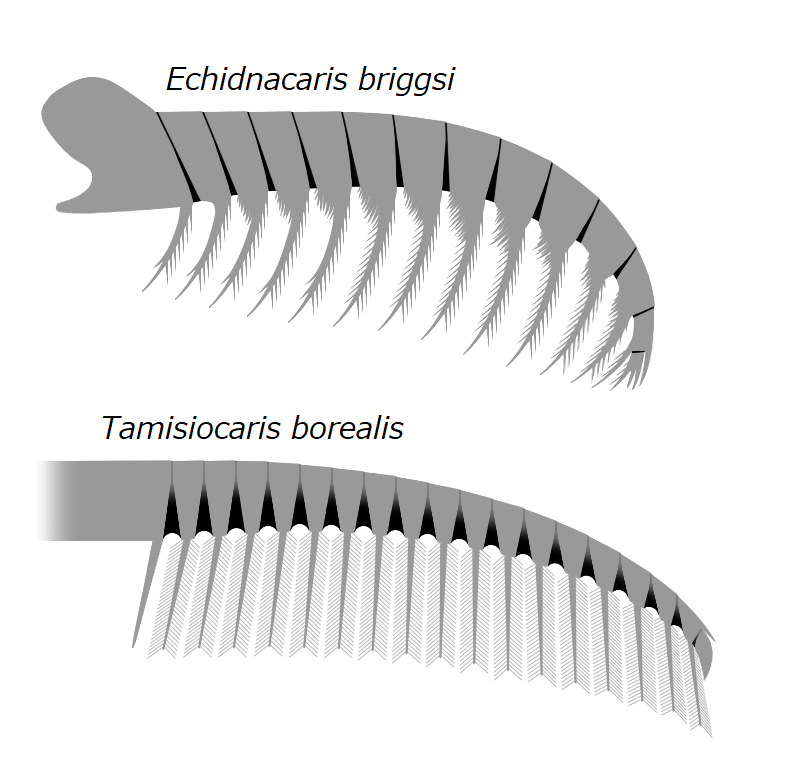
- Frontal appendages of Echidnacaris briggsi and Tamisiocaris borealis

Scientific classification
- Kingdom: Animalia
- Stem group: Arthropoda
- Class: †Dinocaridida
- Order: †Radiodonta
- Family: †Tamisiocarididae; Pates & Daley, 2019

Genera
- †Tamisiocaris; †Echidnacaris; †Houcaris?

Synonyms
- Cetiocaridae

= Tamisiocarididae =

Tamisiocarididae Temporal range: Cambrian stage 3–Cambrian stage 4

Clade of extinct arthropods

Tamisiocarididae is a family of radiodonts, extinct marine animals related to arthropods, that bore finely spined appendages that were presumably used in filter-feeding. When first discovered, the clade was named Cetiocaridae after a speculative evolution artwork, Bearded Ceticaris by John Meszaros, that depicted a hypothetical filter-feeding radiodont at a time before any were known to exist. However, the family name was not valid according to the International Code of Zoological Nomenclature, as no real genus named "Cetiocaris" exists, and in 2019 it was formally replaced by the name Tamisiocarididae, after the only valid genus of the clade at the time. The family is only known from Series 2 of the Cambrian, unlike other radiodont families, which persisted longer into the Cambrian. All known species would have lived in tropical or subtropical waters, suggesting a preference for warmer waters.

== Description ==
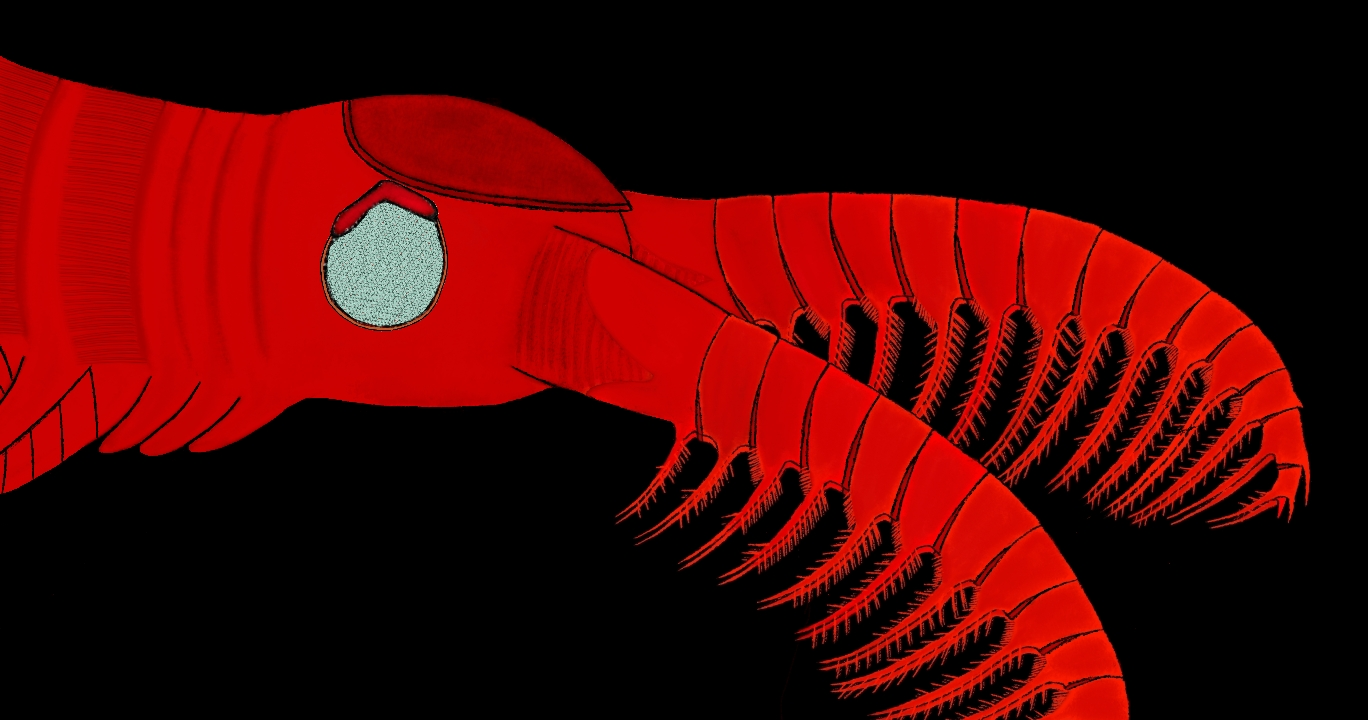
Reconstruction of the head of Echidnacaris.

Like most radiodonts, tamisiocaridids have spiny frontal appendages. However, in this family the auxiliary spines are fine and densely arranged, which are modified for use in filter feeding like modern basking sharks and mysticete whales. For example, Tamisiocaris is estimated to have fed on prey roughly a millimeter in size.

== Classification ==
- Radiodonta
  - Caryosyntrips
  - Anomalocarida
    - - Anomalocarididae
      - Amplectobeluidae
    - - Tamisiocarididae
        - Echidnacaris briggsi
        - Tamisiocaris borealis
      - Hurdiidae

Phylogenetic relationships of Tamisiocarididae

Tamisiocarididae was originally named Cetiocaridae. In the 2013 speculative paleoart book All Your Yesterdays, paleoartist John Meszaros depicted a hypothetical filter-feeding anomalocaridid he named "Ceticaris". This artwork inspired the name of Cetiocaridae. However, as no genus "Cetiocaris" actually exists, the name Cetiocaridae does not comply with article 29 of the International Code of Zoological Nomenclature and is invalid. The family Tamisiocarididae was subsequently devised as a replacement name for the clade. Cetiocaridae was originally defined phylogenetically as all species more closely related to Tamisiocaris borealis than to Anomalocaris canadensis, Amplectobelua symbrachiata, or Hurdia victoria. A 2025 paper described the genus Verrocaris and found it to be an intermediate between the predatory Anomalocarididae and the suspension feeding Tamisiocarididae.

Species of Tamisiocarididae
Species	Describers	Year Named	Age	Location	Frontal Appendage
Echidnacaris briggsi	Nedin	1995	Cambrian Stage 4	Australia	
Houcaris saron?	Hou, Bergström, & Ahlberg	1995	Cambrian Stage 3	China	
Houcaris? magnabasis?	Pates, Daley, Edgecombe, Cong, & Lieberman	2019	Cambrian Stage 4	United States	
Tamisiocaris borealis	Daley & Peel	2010	Cambrian Stage 3	Greenland	

== Distribution ==
Tamisocaridid fossils have been found in the Emu Bay Shale of Australia, Sirius Passet lagerstätte of Greenland, and Kinzers Formation of the United States. Their fossils date to stage 3 and stage 4 of the Cambrian.
