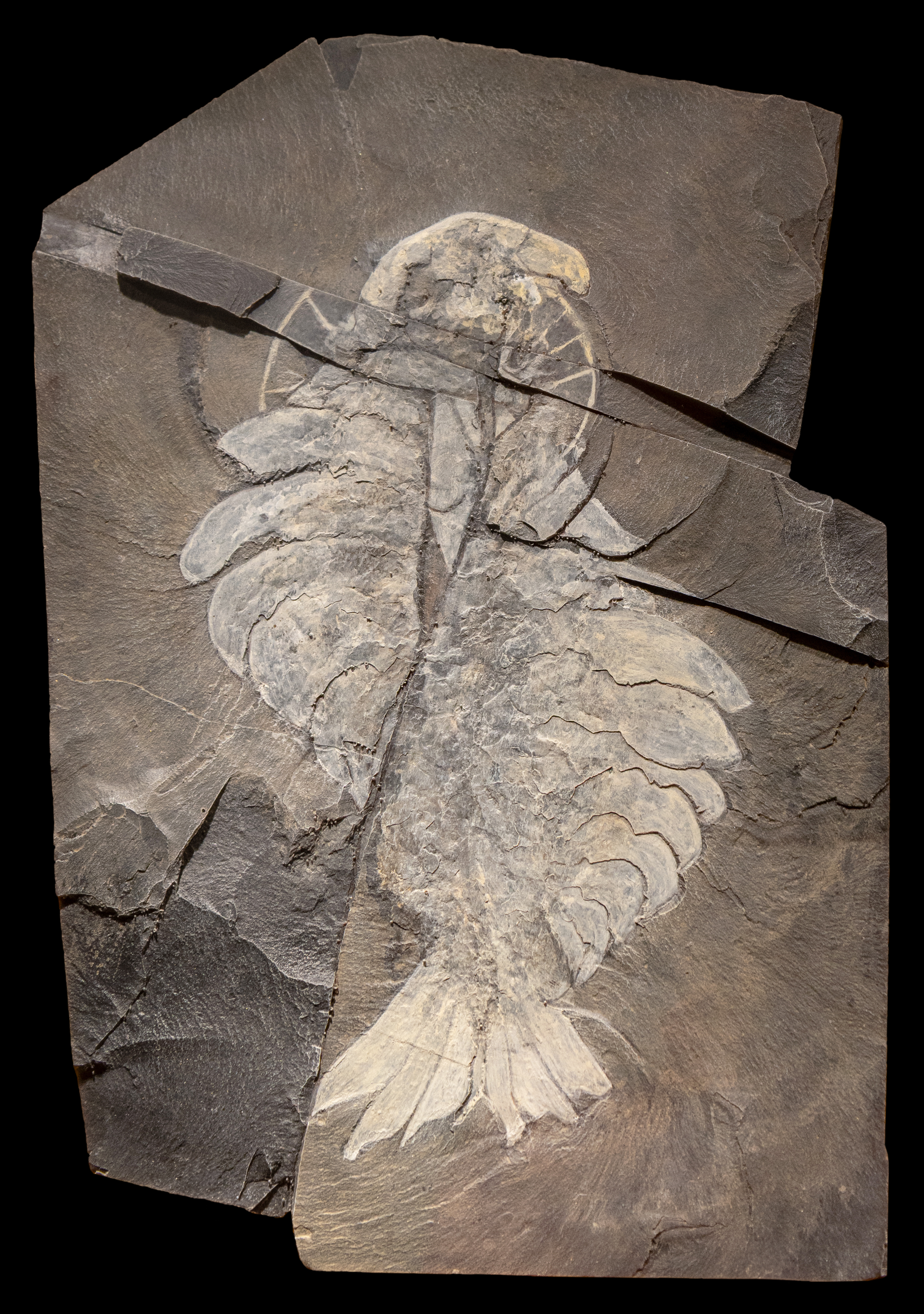
- Cast of TMP 2023.003.0003, a complete specimen of Anomalocaris canadensis
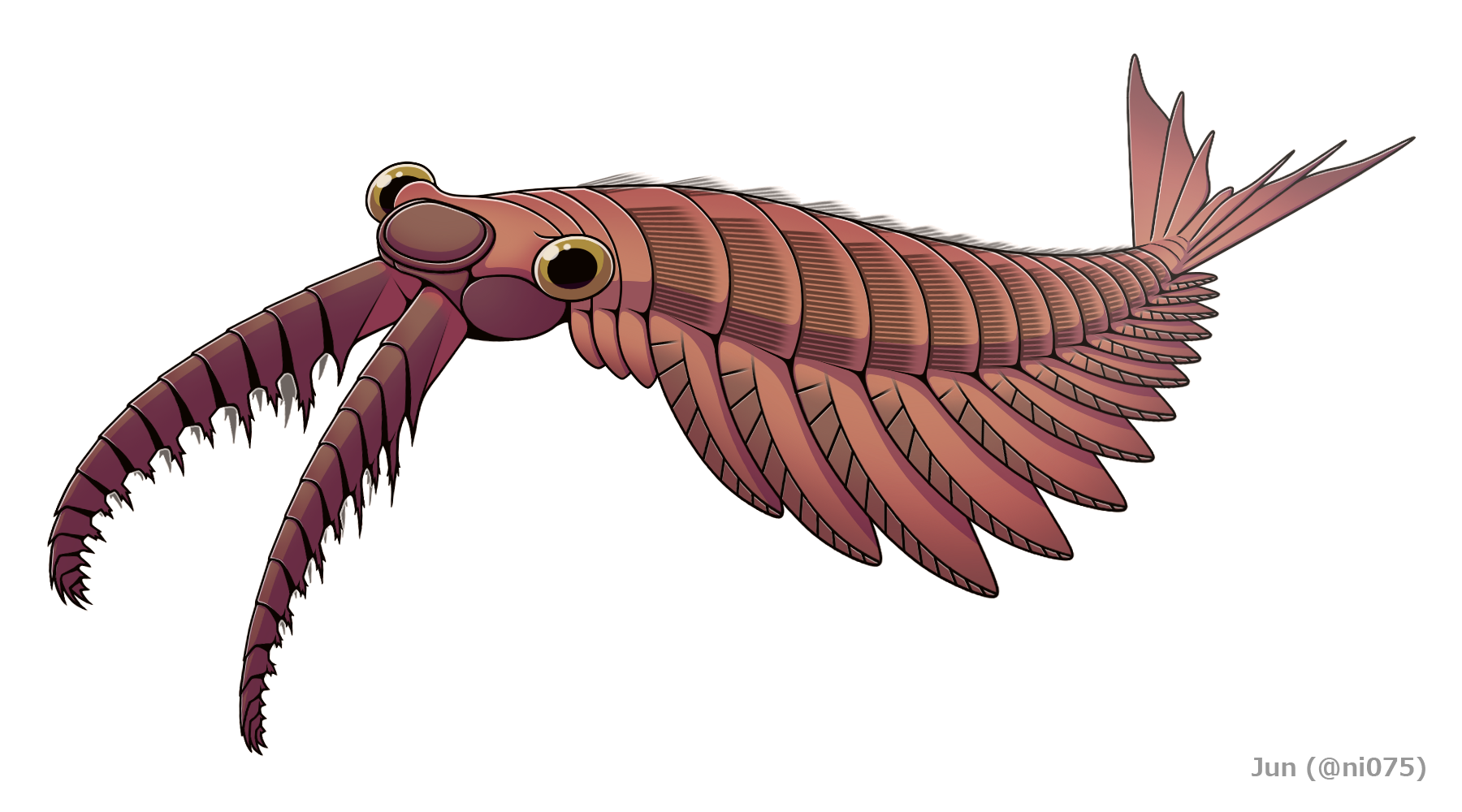
- Life restoration of Anomalocaris canadensis

Scientific classification
- Kingdom: Animalia
- Stem group: Arthropoda
- Class: †Dinocaridida
- Order: †Radiodonta
- Family: †Anomalocarididae
- Genus: †Anomalocaris; Whiteaves, 1892

Species
- A. canadensis Whiteaves, 1892; =A. whiteavesi Walcott, 1908; =A. gigantea Walcott, 1912; =A. cranbrookensis Resser, 1929; A. daleyae Paterson, García-Bellidob & Edgecombe, 2023; (8 more unnamed species)

= Anomalocaris =

Anomalocaris Temporal range: Early Cambrian to Middle Cambrian (Stage 3 to Guzhangian), 520–499 Ma

Extinct genus of Cambrian radiodont

Anomalocaris (from Ancient Greek ανώμαλος, meaning "anomalous", and καρίς, meaning "shrimp", with the intended meaning "unlike other shrimp") is an extinct genus of radiodont, an order of early-diverging stem-group marine arthropods. It is best known from the type species A. canadensis, found in the Stephen Formation (particularly the Burgess Shale) of British Columbia, Canada. The other named species A. daleyae is known from the somewhat older Emu Bay Shale of Australia. Other unnamed Anomalocaris species are known from China and the United States.

Like other radiodonts, Anomalocaris had swimming flaps running along its body, large compound eyes densely packed with lenses, and a single pair of segmented, frontal appendages, which in Anomalocaris were used to grasp prey. Estimated to reach 34.2–37.8 cm (13.5–14.9 in) long excluding the frontal appendages and tail fan, Anomalocaris is one of the largest animals of the Cambrian, and thought to be one of the earliest examples of an apex predator, though others have been found in older Cambrian lagerstätten deposits.

Anomalocaris was only known from its frontal appendages when it was first described in 1892, which were originally considered to be the body of a shrimp-like arthropod. Due to initially only being known from isolated body parts, Anomalocaris has a convoluted taxonomic history, being historically confused with the related radiodont genus Peytoia, with complete body specimens of Anomalocaris only being described in the late 20th century. It is the type genus of Anomalocarididae, a family which previously included all radiodonts but recently only Anomalocaris and a few closely related taxa.

== Discovery, identification and evolution ==
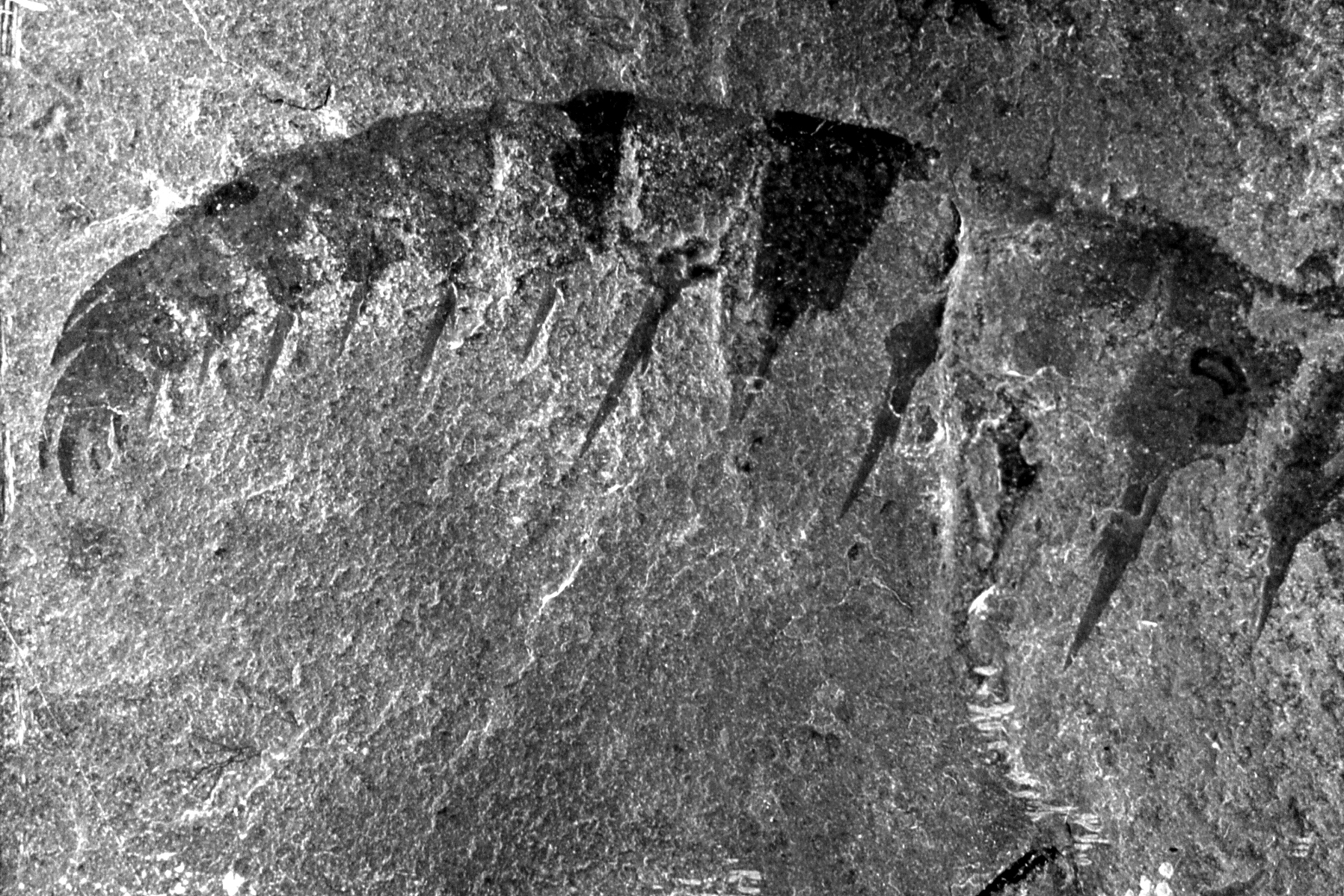
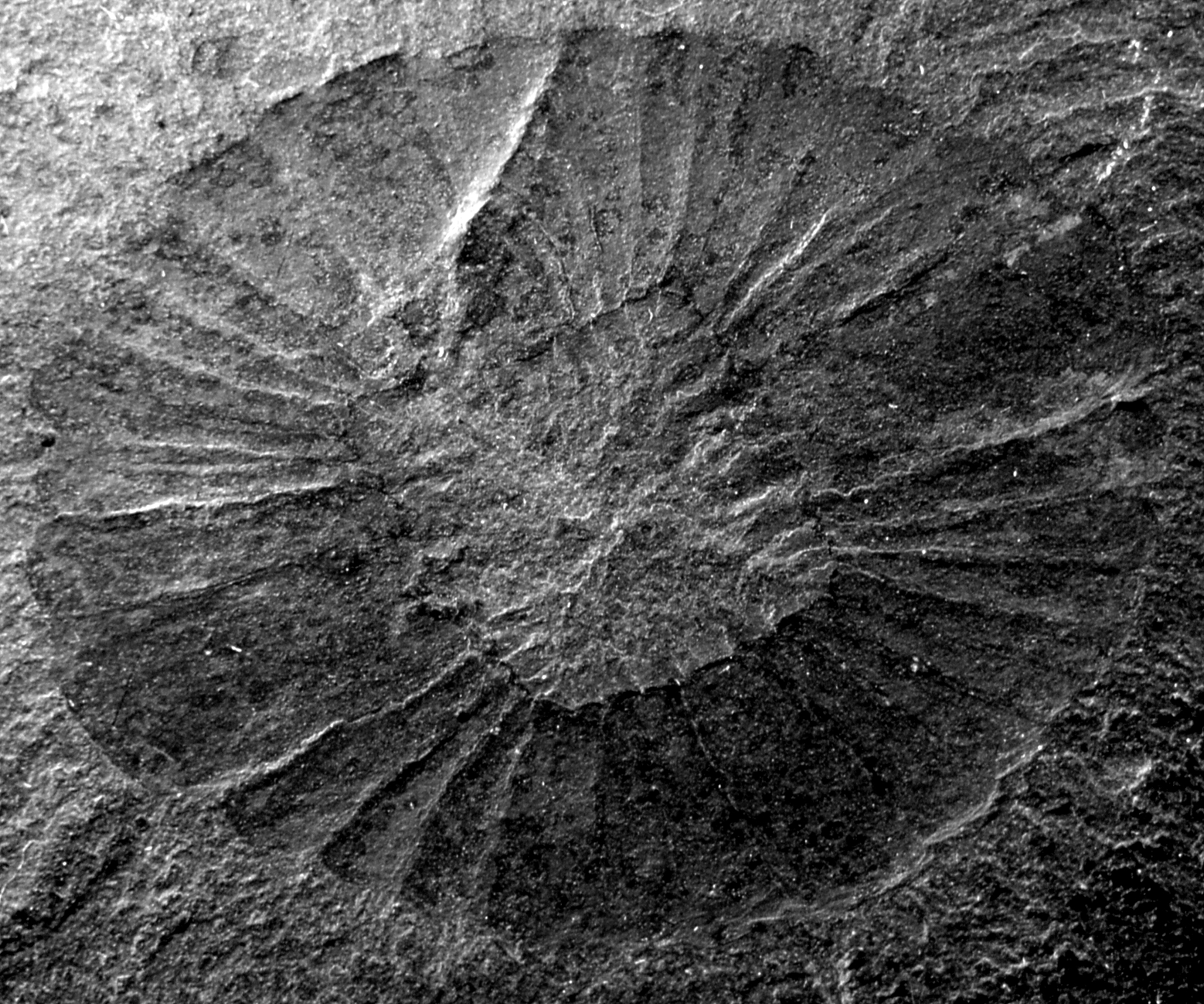
Frontal appendage of Anomalocaris canadensis (top) and mouthpiece of Peytoia nathorsti (bottom) from British Columbia. The latter was originally assigned to the former species.

=== History of research ===
From the start, Anomalocaris fossil was misidentified, followed by a series of misidentifications and taxonomic revisions. As Stephen Jay Gould, who popularised the Cambrian explosion in his 1989 book Wonderful Life, explained:

[The story of Anomalocaris is] a tale of humor, error, struggle, frustration, and more error, culminating in an extraordinary resolution that brought together bits and pieces of three "phyla" in a single reconstructed creature, the largest and fiercest of Cambrian organisms.

Anomalocaris fossils were first collected in 1886 by Richard G. McConnell of the Geological Survey of Canada (GSC). Having been informed of rich fossils at the Stephen Formation in British Columbia, McConnell climbed Mount Stephen on 13 September 1886. He found abundant trilobites, along with two unknown specimens. In August 1891, Henri-Marc Ami, Assistant Palaeontologist at GSC, collected many trilobites and brachiopod fossils, along with 48 more of the unknown specimens. The fifty specimens were examined and described in 1892 by GSC paleontologist Joseph Frederick Whiteaves. Whiteaves interpreted them as the abdomens of phyllocarid crustaceans, and gave the full scientific name Anomalocaris canadensis. He describes the crustacean characters:

Body or abdominal segments, which, in all the specimens collected, are abnormally flattened laterally, a little higher or deeper than long, broader above than below, the pair of ventral appendages proceeding from each, nearly equal in height or depth to the segment itself... The generic name Anomalocaris (from ανώμαλος, unlike,—καρίς, a shrimp, i.e., unlike other shrimps) [the species name referring to Canada] is suggested by the unusual shape of the uropods or ventral appendages of the body segments and the relative position of the caudal spine.

In 1928, Danish paleontologist Kai Henriksen proposed that Tuzoia, a Burgess Shale arthropod which was known only from the carapace, represented the missing front half of Anomalocaris. The artists Elie Cheverlange and Charles R. Knight followed this interpretation in their depictions of Anomalocaris.

Not known to scientists at the time, the body parts of relatives of Anomalocaris had already been described but not recognized as such. The first fossilized mouth of such a kind of animal was discovered by Charles Doolittle Walcott, who mistook it for a jellyfish and placed it in the genus Peytoia. Walcott also discovered a frontal appendage but failed to realize the similarities to Whiteaves' discovery and instead identified it as feeding appendage or tail of the coexisting Sidneyia. In the same publication in which he named Peytoia, Walcott named Laggania, a taxon that he interpreted as a holothurian.

In 1966, the Geological Survey of Canada began a comprehensive revision of the Burgess Shale fossil record, led by Cambridge University paleontologist Harry B. Whittington. In the process of this revision, Whittington and his students Simon Conway Morris and Derek Briggs would discover the true nature of Anomalocaris and its relatives, but not without contributing to the history of misinterpretations first. In 1978, Conway Morris recognized that the mouthparts of Laggania were identical to Peytoia, but concluded that Laggania was a composite fossil made up of Peytoia and the sponge Corralio undulata. In 1979, Briggs recognized that the fossils of Anomalocaris were appendages, not abdomens, and proposed that they were the walking legs of a giant arthropod, and that the feeding appendage Walcott had assigned to Sidneyia was the feeding appendage of similar animal, referred to as "appendage F". Later, while clearing what he thought was an unrelated specimen, Harry B. Whittington removed a layer of covering stone to discover the unequivocally connected frontal appendage identical to Anomalocaris and mouthpart similar to Peytoia. Whittington linked the two species, but it took several more years for researchers to realize that the continuously juxtaposed Peytoia, Laggania and frontal appendages (Anomalocaris and "appendage F") actually represented a single group of enormous creatures. The two genera have now been placed into the order Radiodonta and are commonly known as radiodonts or anomalocaridids. Since Peytoia was named first, it is the accepted correct name for the entire animal. However, the original frontal appendage was from a larger species distinct from Peytoia and "Laggania" and therefore retains the name Anomalocaris.

In 2011, compound eyes of Anomalocaris were recovered from a paleontological dig at Emu Bay Shale on Kangaroo Island, Australia, proving that Anomalocaris was indeed an arthropod as had been suspected. The find also indicated that advanced arthropod eyes had evolved very early, before the evolution of jointed legs or hardened exoskeletons. This specimen was later identified as that of a new species of Anomalocaris, A. daleyae.

=== Reassigned species ===
Numerous species have been previously referred to Anomalocaris, but subsequent analyses have doubted this generic assignment, and reclassified them within different genera. In 2021, "A." saron and "A." magnabasis were reassigned to the new genus Houcaris in the family Tamisiocarididae, but subsequent analysis suggests that H. saron is a member of the family Amplectobeluidae instead and that H? magnabasis (recovered as a sister taxon of Amplectobeluidae) does not form a monophyletic clade with other species of Houcaris. In the same year, "A." pennsylvanica was reassigned to the genus Lenisicaris. In 2022, specimen ELRC 20001 that was treated as an unnamed species of Anomalocaris or whole-body specimen of A. saron got a new genus, Innovatiocaris. In 2023, "A". kunmingensis was reassigned to the new genus Guanshancaris in the family Amplectobeluidae. Multiple phylogenetic analyses also suggested that "A". briggsi (tamisiocaridid) was not a species of Anomalocaris either, and it was reassigned to the genus Echidnacaris in the family Tamisiocarididae in 2023.

=== Evolution ===
Radiodonts like Anomalocaris are recognised as early diverging relatives of modern arthropods, sharing key morphological features such as bearing segmented frontal appendages and compound eyes, but also lacking key features of modern arthropods (Deuteropoda), such as lacking segmented two-branched (biramous) trunk limbs. Cladogram after Liu et al. 2026:

- Panarthropoda
  - † "Lobopodia" (paraphyletic, ancestral to tardigrades, onychophorans and arthropods)
  - Total group Euarthropoda
    - †Megadictyon
    - - - †Kerygmachela
        - - †Pambdelurion
          - - †Opabiniidae
            - - † Radiodonta (incl. Anomalocaris)
              - Deuteropoda
                - †Erratus
                - - †Sunella
                  - - †Isoxyidae + "Great appendage bivalved forms"
                    - - - †Fengzhengia
                        - †Kylinxia
                      - - †Megacheira
                        - Pan-Chelicerata
                      - - †Kiisortoqia
                        - †Bushizheia
                        - Antennulata
                          - †Artiopoda (including Trilobita)
                          - Mandibulata
                            - †Fuxianhuiida
                            - - †Hymenocarina
                              - - Myriapoda
                                - Pancrustacea

== Description ==
Size of a large A. canadensis compared to a human and Amplectobelua

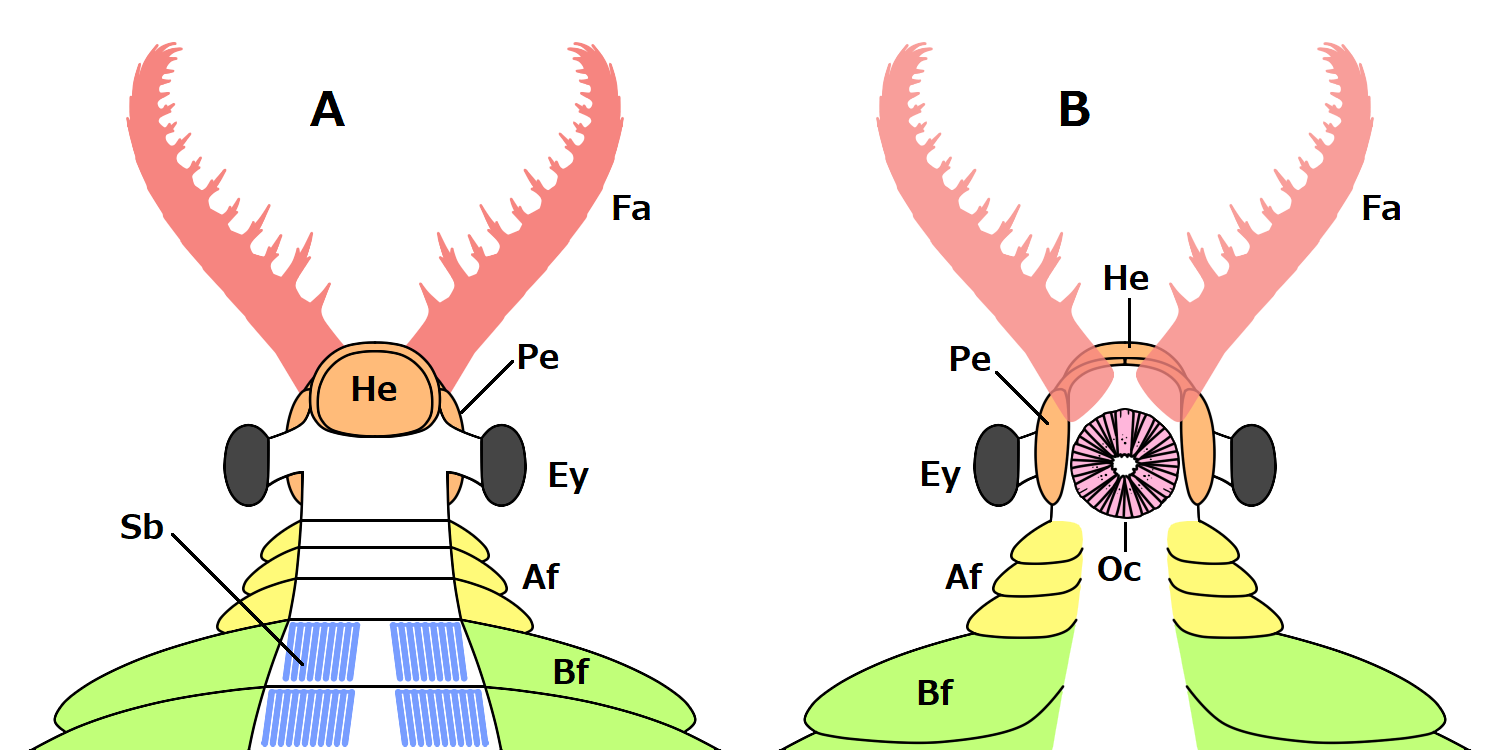
View of the head of Anomalocaris from above (left) and below (right) Key: Fa: Frontal appendage, He: H-element, Pe: P-element, Ey: Eye, Oc: Oral cone, Af: Anterior (neck) flap, Bf: Body flap, Sb: Setal blade

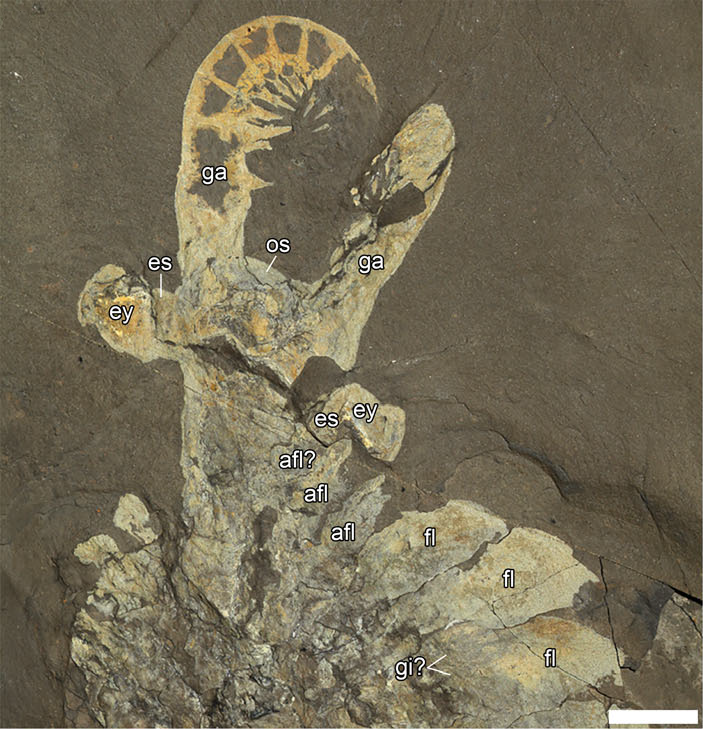
Closeup of the head of specimen ROMIP 51212 of Anomalocaris canadensis

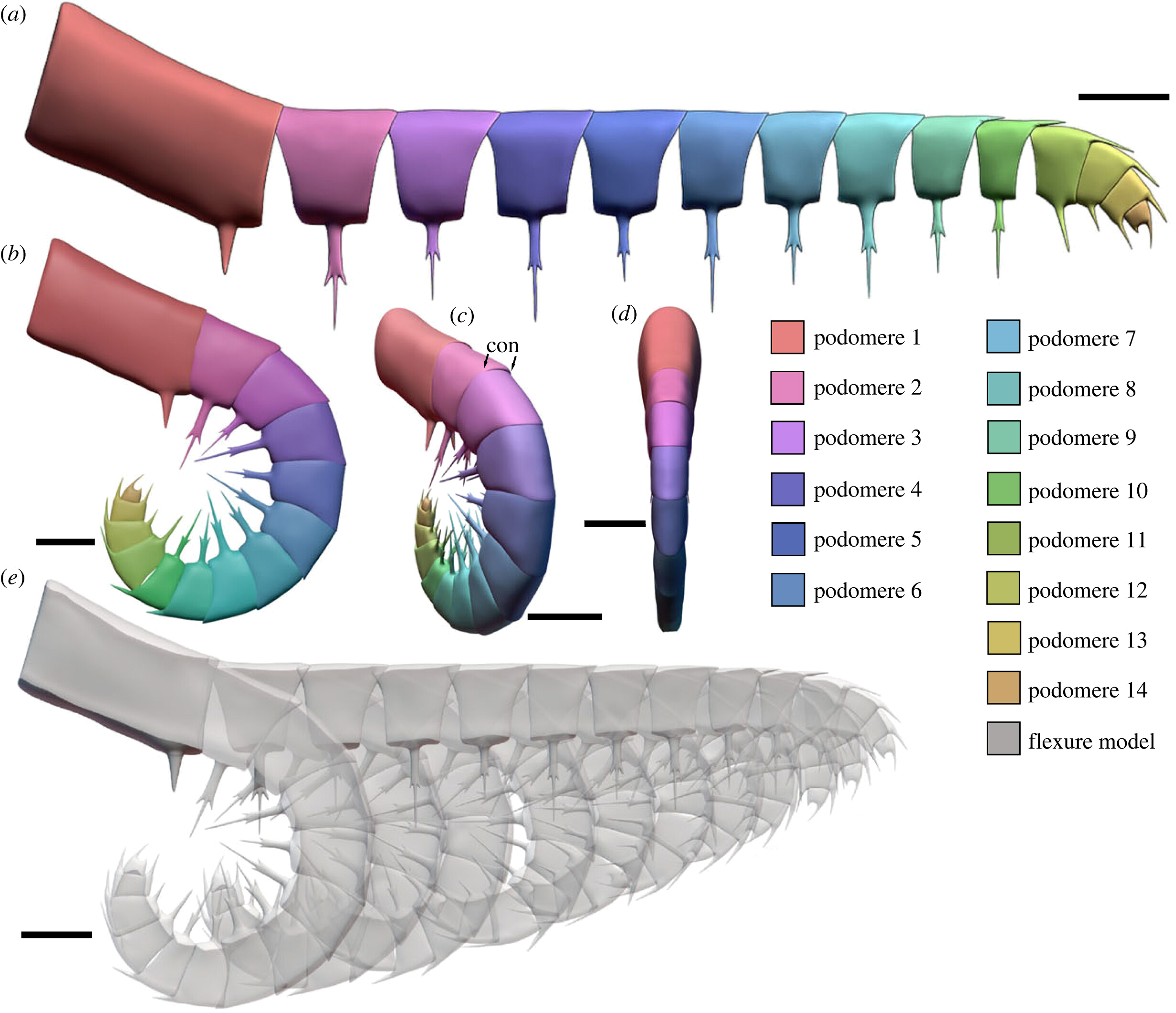
3D model of the frontal appendages of Anomalocaris canadensis

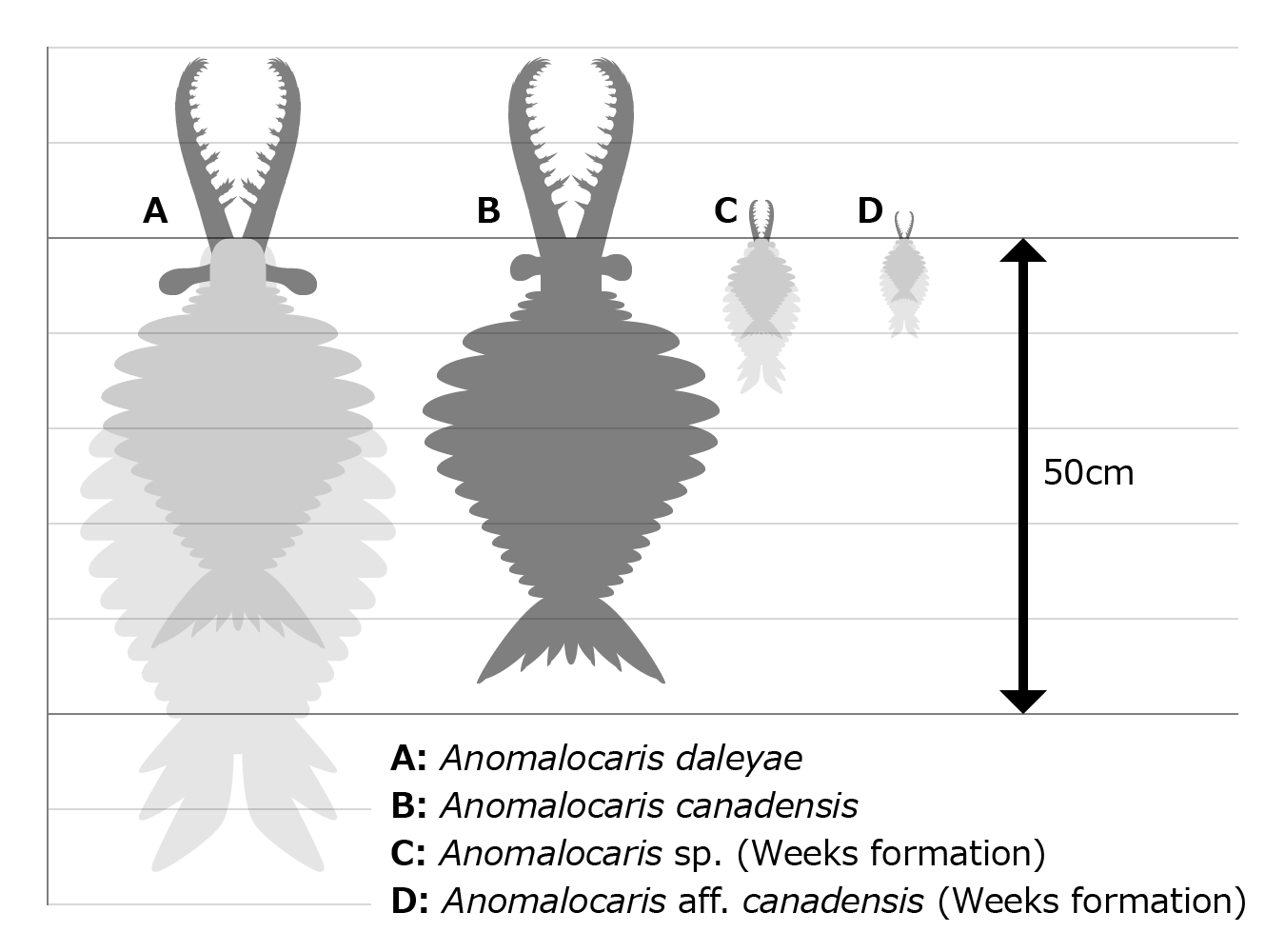
Size estimation of Anomalocaris specimens

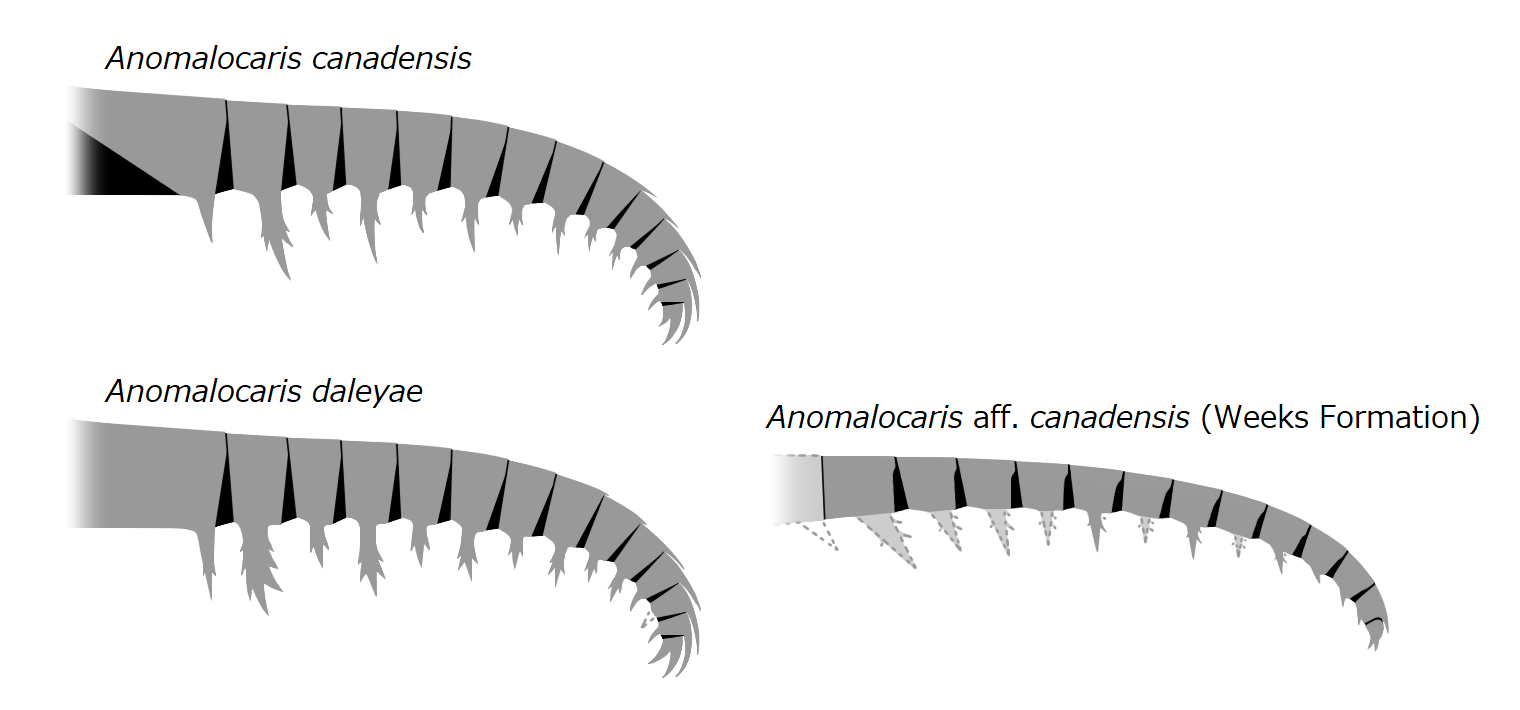
Frontal appendages of different Anomalocaris species

Anomalocaris was gigantic in comparison to contemporary animals. A complete specimen of A. canadensis, ROMIP 51211, is measured up to 20.5 cm (8.1 in) long (17.4 cm (6.9 in) long when excluding the frontal appendages and tail fan). The largest frontal appendage is measured up to 18 cm (7.1 in) long when extended, and this specimen of A. canadensis would have reached up to 34.2–37.8 cm (1.12–1.24 ft) in body length excluding the frontal appendages and tail fan.^{Dryad data 04} Previous body length estimation up to 1 m (3.3 ft) is unlikely based on the ratio of body parts (body length measured only about 2 times the length of frontal appendage in A. canadensis) and the size of largest frontal appendage. A. daleyae (formerly A. cf. canadensis or A. aff. canadensis) from the Emu Bay Shale of Australia is larger than A. canadensis, with the largest known appendage measuring up to 18.3 cm (7.2 in) long, which would have belonged to an individual between 34.8–51.2 cm (1.14–1.68 ft) long.

Animation showing the swimming motion of the body flaps used by radiodonts including Anomalocaris

Anomalocaris propelled itself through the water by undulating the flexible flaps on the sides of its body. Each flap sloped below the one more posterior to it, and this overlapping allowed the lobes on each side of the body to act as a single "fin", maximizing the swimming efficiency. The construction of a remote-controlled model showed this mode of swimming to be intrinsically stable, implying that Anomalocaris would not have needed a complex brain to manage balance while swimming. The body was widest between the third and fifth lobe and narrowed towards the tail, with additional three pairs of small flaps on the constricted neck region. It is difficult to distinguish lobes near the tail, making an accurate count difficult. For the main trunk flaps, the type species A. canadensis had 13 pairs.

Head anatomy

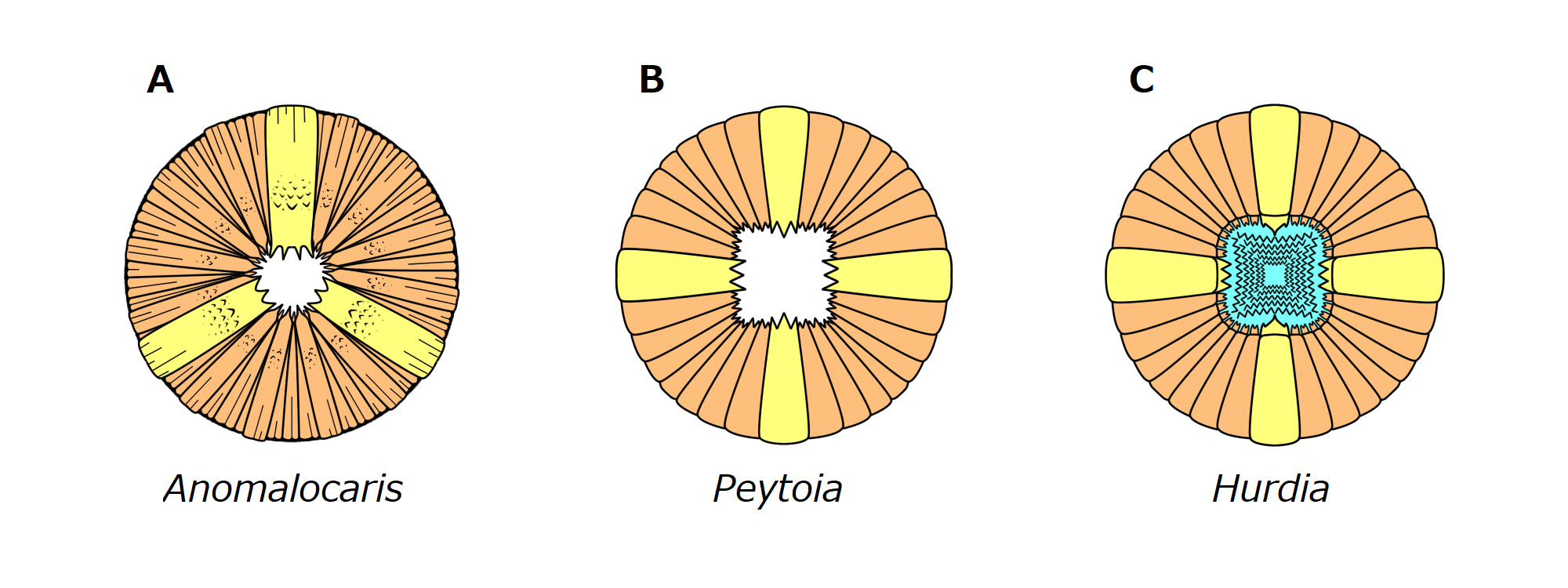
Oral cones of Anomalocaris (A), Peytoia (B) and Hurdia (C), the former showing unique triradial, tuberculated and wrinkled structures

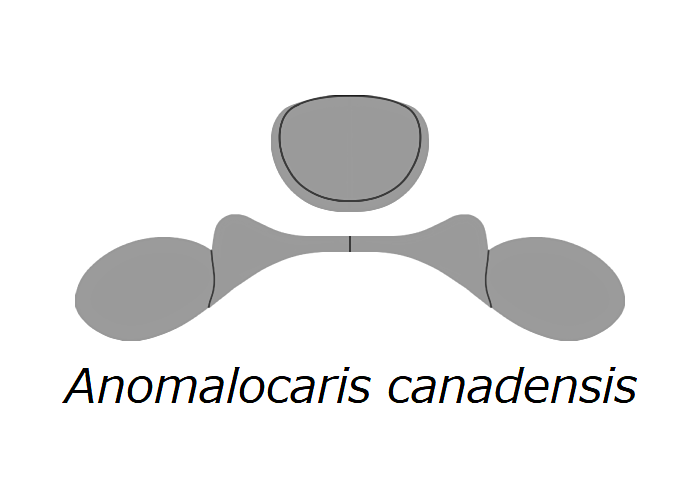
The head sclerite structure of Anomalocaris

Anomalocaris had an unusual disk-like mouth known as an oral cone. The oral cone was composed of several plates organized triradially. Three of the plates were quite large. Three to four medium sized plates could be found between each of the large plates, and several small plates between them. Most of the plates wrinkled and have scale-like tubercles near the mouth opening. Such an oral cone is very different from those of a typical hurdiid radiodont like Peytoia and Hurdia, which is smooth and tetraradial.

As a shared character across radiodonts, Anomalocaris also had three sclerites on the top and side of its head. The top one, known as a head shield, dorsal carapace or H-element, was shaped like a laterally-elongated oval, with a distinct rim on the outer edge. The remaining two lateral sclerites, known as P-elements, were also ovoid, but connected by a bar-like outgrowth. The P-elements were previously misinterpreted as two huge compound eyes.

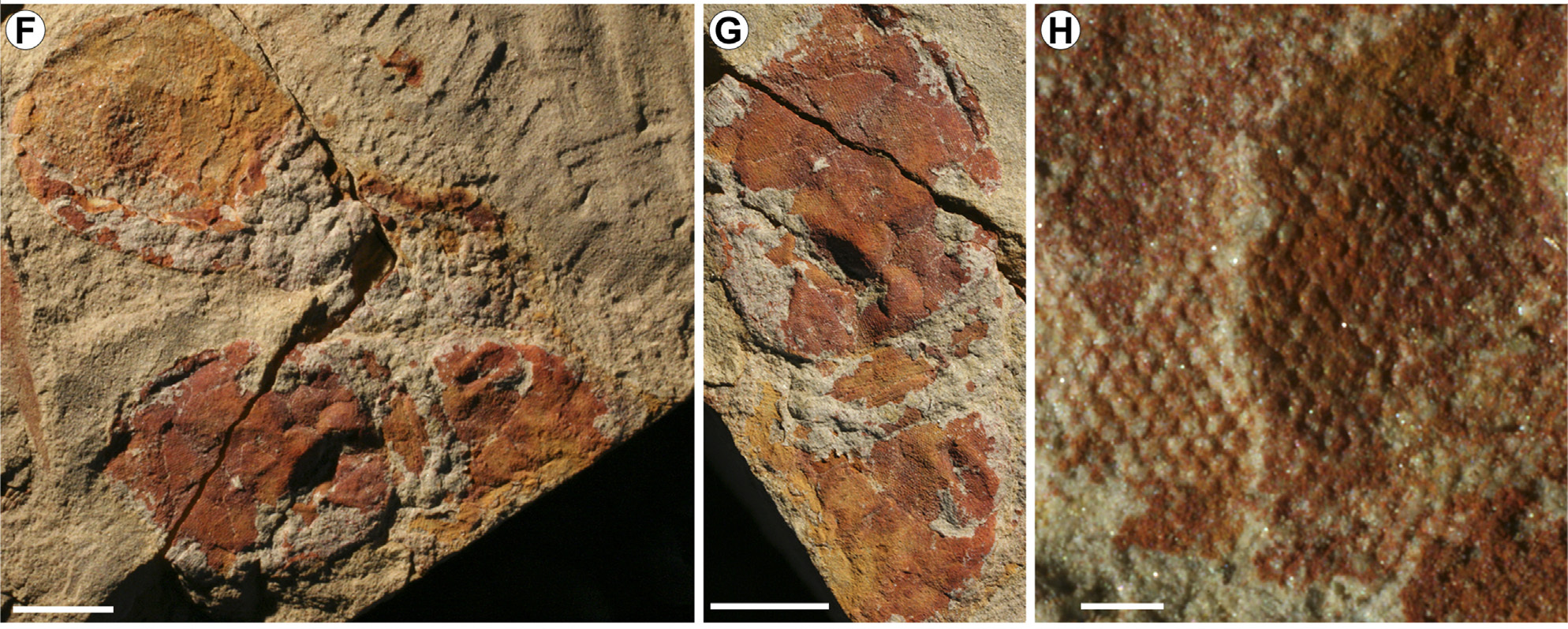
Fossilised compound eyes of Anomalocaris from the Emu Bay shale of Australia with preserved individual ommatidia lenses. Scale bar = 5 millimetres (0.20 in) in left and centre images, 0.3 millimetres (1/64 in) on right

Based on fossilized compound eyes from the Emu Bay Shale, which belong to the species Anomalocaris daleyae, the stalked eyes of Anomalocaris were 30 times more powerful than those of trilobites, long thought to have had the most advanced eyes of any contemporary species. With one specimen having over 24,000 lenses (ommatidia) in one eye, the resolution of the 3-centimetre-wide (1.2 in) eyes would have been rivalled only by that of the modern dragonfly, which has 28,000 lenses in each eye. Additionally, estimation of ecdysozoan opsins suggest that Anomalocaris may have had dichromatic color vision.

The tail was a large tail fan, composed of three pairs of large, lateral fin-shaped lobes and one terminal lobe-like tailpiece. Previous studies suggest the tail fan was used to propel it through Cambrian waters, while further hydrodynamic study rather suggest it was more adapted to provide steering function. The gills of the animal, in the form of long, thin, hair-like structures known as lanceolate blades, were arranged in rows forming setal blades. The setal blades were attached by their margin to the top side of the animal, two setal blades per body segment. A divide ran down the middle, separating the gills.

Perhaps the most notable part of Anomalocaris are the two frontal appendages, large limbs positioned in front of the mouth, at the front of the head. Each frontal appendage of Anomalocaris usually had 14 podomeres (segmental units, at least 1 for shaft and 13 for distal articulated region), with each appendage being laterally flattened (taller than wide). Most podomeres were tipped with a pair of endites (ventral spines). The endites themselves were both equipped with multiple auxiliary spines, which branches off from the anterior and posterior margin of the endites.

== Paleobiology ==
Grasping movement of the frontal appendage of A. canadensis

The interpretation of Anomalocaris as an active predator is widely accepted throughout the history of research, as its raptorial frontal appendages and mid-gut glands strongly suggest a predatory lifestyle. In the case of A. canadensis, its outstanding size amongst Burgess Shale fauna also make it one of the first apex predators known to exist.

However, the long-standing idea that Anomalocaris fed on hard-bodied animals, especially its ability to penetrate mineralized exoskeleton of trilobites, has been questioned, with many recent studies considering it more likely that Anomalocaris exclusively hunted soft-bodied prey. Some Cambrian trilobites have been found with round or W-shaped "bite" marks, which were identified as being the same shape as the mouthparts of Peytoia (previously misidentified as those of Anomalocaris). Stronger evidence that Anomalocaris ate trilobites comes from coprolites, which contain trilobite parts and are so large that the radiodonts are the only known organism from that period large enough to have produced them. However, since Anomalocaris lacks any mineralized tissue, it seemed unlikely that it would be able to penetrate the hard, calcified exoskeleton of trilobites. Rather, the coprolites may have been produced by different organisms, such as the trilobites of the genus Redlichia. Another suggested possibility was that Anomalocaris fed by grabbing one end of their prey in its oral cone while using its frontal appendages to quickly rock the other end of the animal back and forth. This produced stresses that exploited the weaknesses of arthropod cuticles, causing the prey's exoskeleton to rupture and allowing the predator to access its innards. This behaviour was originally thought to have provided an evolutionary pressure for trilobites to roll up, to avoid being flexed until they snapped.

The lack of wear on radiodont mouthparts suggests they did not come into regular contact with mineralized trilobite shells, and were possibly better suited to feeding on smaller, soft-bodied organisms by suction, since they would have experienced structural failure if they were used against the armour of trilobites. A. canadensis was suggested to have been capable of feeding on organisms with hard exoskeletons due to the short, robust spines on its frontal appendages. However, this conclusion is solely based on the comparison with the fragile frontal appendages of suspension feeding radiodonts (e.g. Echidnacaris and Houcaris spp.). The typical lack of damage to the endites on the frontal appendages of A. canadensis (with damage only present on a single specimen) suggests that they were not used to grasp hard-shelled prey. As opposed to Peytoia whose oral cone is more rectangular with short protruding spines, the oral cone of A. canadensis has a smaller and more irregular opening, not permitting strong biting motions, and indicating a suction-feeding behavior to suck in softer organisms. Three-dimensional modelling of various radiodont frontal appendages also suggest that A. canadensis is more capable to prey on smaller (2–5 cm or 0.8–2.0 inches in diameter), active, soft-bodied animals (e.g. vetulicolian; free-swimming arthropods like isoxyids and hymenocarines; Nectocaris).

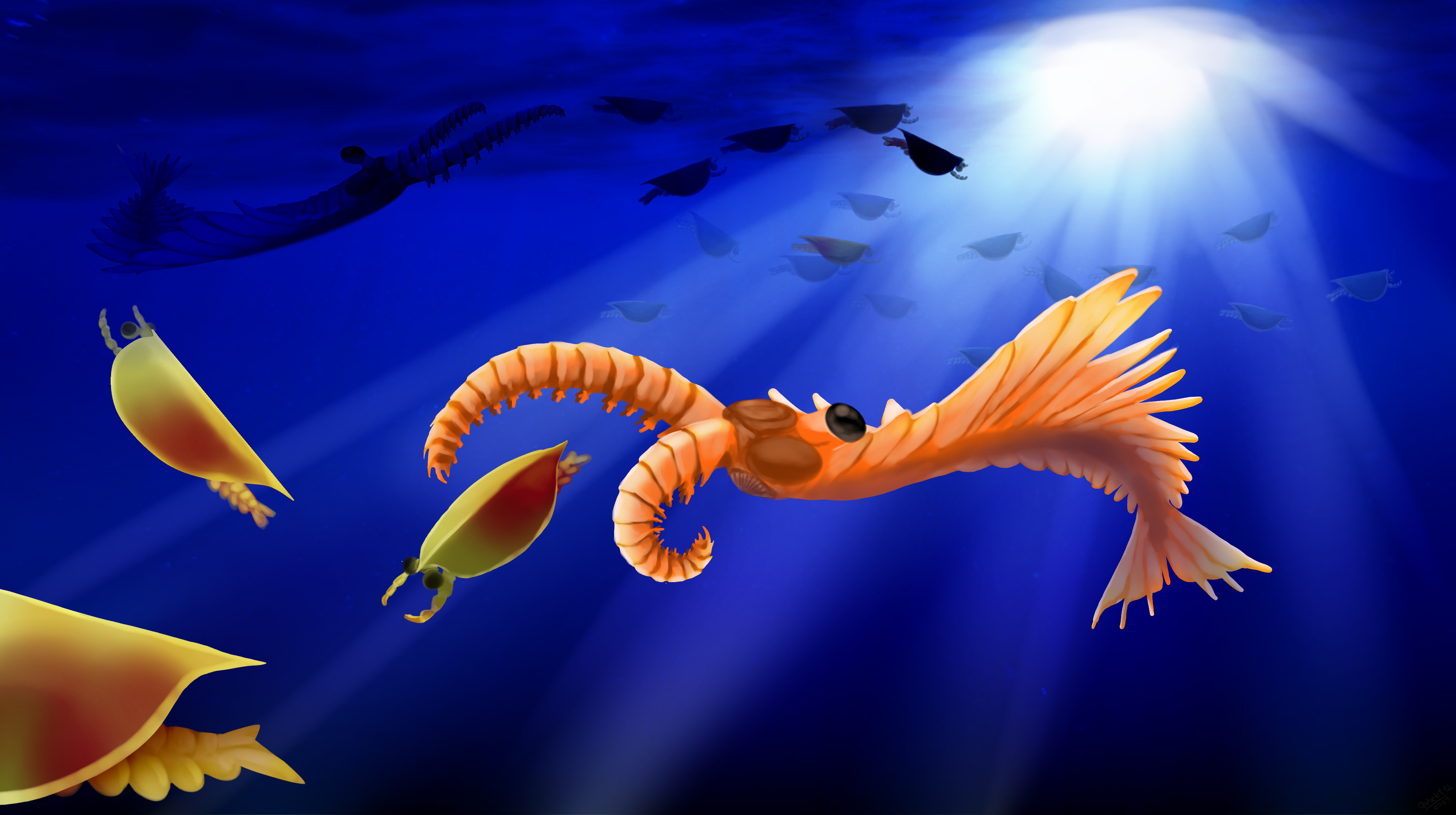
Ecological reconstruction of Anomalocaris hunting Isoxys, with Anomalocaris swimming posture in the background upper left with frontal appendages outstreched after that proposed in Bicknell et al. (2023)

Bicknell et al. (2023) examined the frontal appendages of Anomalocaris, suggesting it was an active nektonic apex predator. Postured with the frontal appendages outstretched, Anomalocaris would have been able to swim with maximized speed, similar to modern predatory water bugs. Its eyes would be suitable to hunt prey in well-lit waters. Anomalocaris would have hunted various free-swimming animals since there are a large diversity of nektonic and pelagic soft-bodied animals. It probably would have not hunted benthic animals like trilobites, considering the possibility of damaging the frontal appendages on the substrate while trying to grab prey from seafloor at speed. Instead, other animals such as other radiodonts (e.g. Hurdia, Cambroraster, Titanokorys, Stanleycaris) and artiopods (e.g. Sidneyia) would have been benthic predators in the Burgess Shale.

The large, high-resolution eyes of Anomalocaris—similar to those of dragonflies, as well as mantis shrimps and robberflies—suggests that they utilized the predictive target interception strategy of these extant species, that is, calculating a prey's trajectory in order to steer themselves to its anticipated location.

== Paleoecology ==
Specimens of Anomalocaris have been found worldwide spanning from Cambrian Stage 3 to the Guzhangian. Aside from the Burgess Shale and Emu Bay Shale, fossils have been found in the Chengjiang Biota, Hongjingshao Formation, Balang Formation and the Kaili Formation of China, as well as the Eagar Formation and Weeks Formation in the United States.

Anomalocaris canadensis lived in the Burgess Shale in relatively great numbers. In the Burgess Shale, Anomalocaris is more common in the older sections, notably the Mount Stephen trilobite beds. However, in the younger sections, such as the Phyllopod bed, Anomalocaris could reach much greater sizes—roughly twice the size of its older, trilobite bed relatives. These rare giant specimens have previously been referred to a separate species, Anomalocaris gigantea; however, the validity of this species has been called into question, and is currently synonymized to A. canadensis.

Other unnamed species of Anomalocaris live in vastly different environments. For example, Anomalocaris cf. canadensis (JS-1880) lived in the Maotianshan Shales, a shallow tropical sea or river delta in what is now Eastern Yunnan in modern China. Anomalocaris daleyae (Emu Bay Shale) lived in a comparable environment; the shallow, tropical waters of Cambrian Australia. The Maotianshan Shale and the Emu Bay Shale are very close in proximity, being separated by a small landmass, far from the Burgess Shale. These two locations also included "Anomalocaris" kunmingensis and "Anomalocaris" briggsi respectively, which are no longer considered species of Anomalocaris.

== See also ==
- 8564 Anomalocaris, an asteroid named after this animal.
- Aegirocassis, a giant filter-feeding radiodont from Ordovician Morocco.
- Opabinia, a genus of bizarre stem-group arthropods related to the radiodonts.
- Wiwaxia, a genus of possible mollusk that had copious numbers of carbonaceous scales, and lived alongside Anomalocaris.
- Paleobiota of the Burgess Shale
