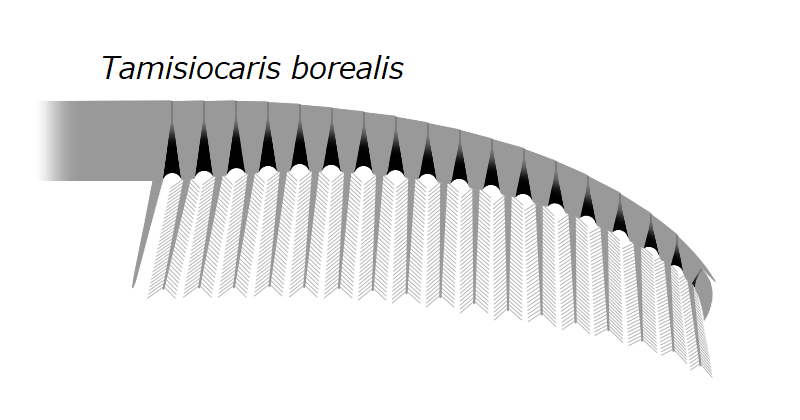

- Movement of a frontal appendage

Scientific classification
- Kingdom: Animalia
- Stem group: Arthropoda
- Class: †Dinocaridida
- Order: †Radiodonta
- Family: †Tamisiocarididae
- Genus: †Tamisiocaris; Daley & Peel, 2010
- Species: †T. borealis

Binomial name
- †Tamisiocaris borealis Daley & Peel, 2010

= Tamisiocaris =

Tamisiocaris Temporal range: Cambrian Stage 3

Extinct genus of marine animals

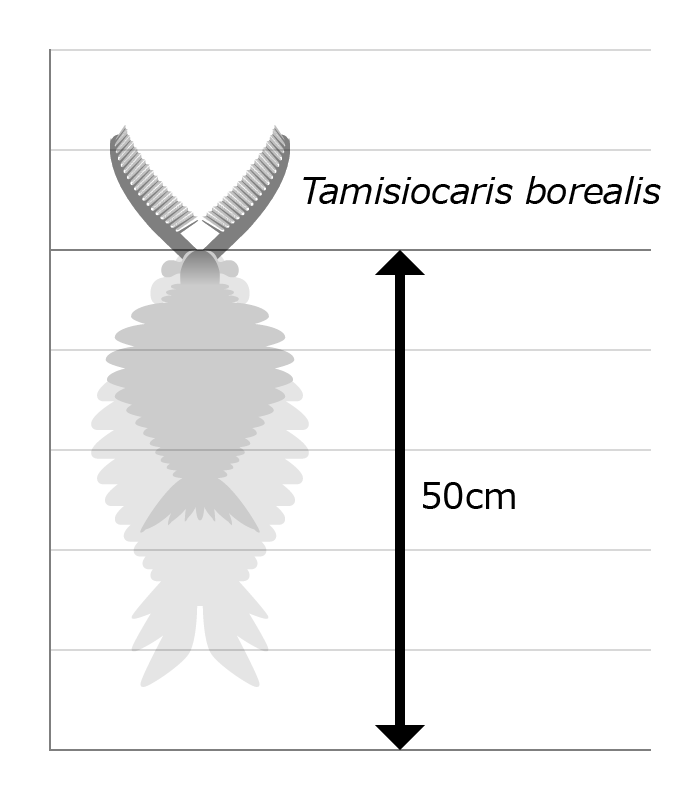
Size diagram

Tamisiocaris (from Latin tamisium, sieve, and Greek karis, crab, shrimp) is a radiodont genus from the Cambrian period. The taxon was initially described in 2010 based on frontal appendages discovered from the Sirius Passet lagerstatte in northern Greenland. A subsequent study by Vinther and colleagues in 2014 revealed that the frontal appendages were segmented and bore densely packed auxiliary spines, which were adapted to suspension feeding in a manner analogous to modern baleen whales. It is assigned to the family Tamisiocarididae, and is measured about 22.8–33.6 cm (0.75–1.10 ft) long.

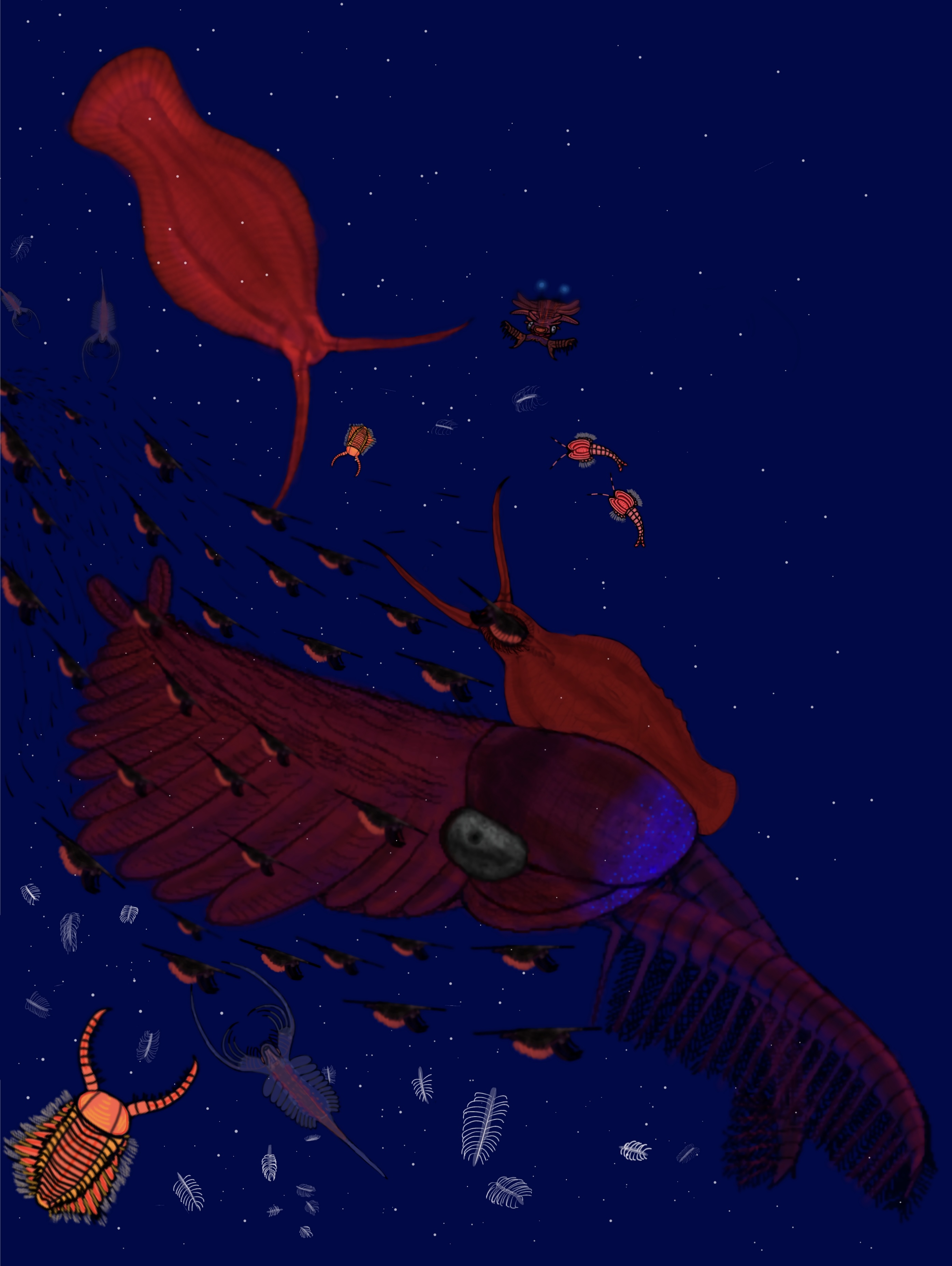
Life reconstruction of Tamisiocaris borealis alongside other organisms from the Sirius Passet.

== Phylogeny ==
Tamisiocaris in cladogram after Vinther et al., 2014.

- Radiodonta
  - Caryosyntrips
  - Anomalocarida
    - - Anomalocarididae
      - Amplectobeluidae
    - - Tamisiocarididae
        - Echidnacaris briggsi
        - Tamisiocaris borealis
      - Hurdiidae
