= Top of the World Provincial Park =

Provincial park in British Columbia, Canada

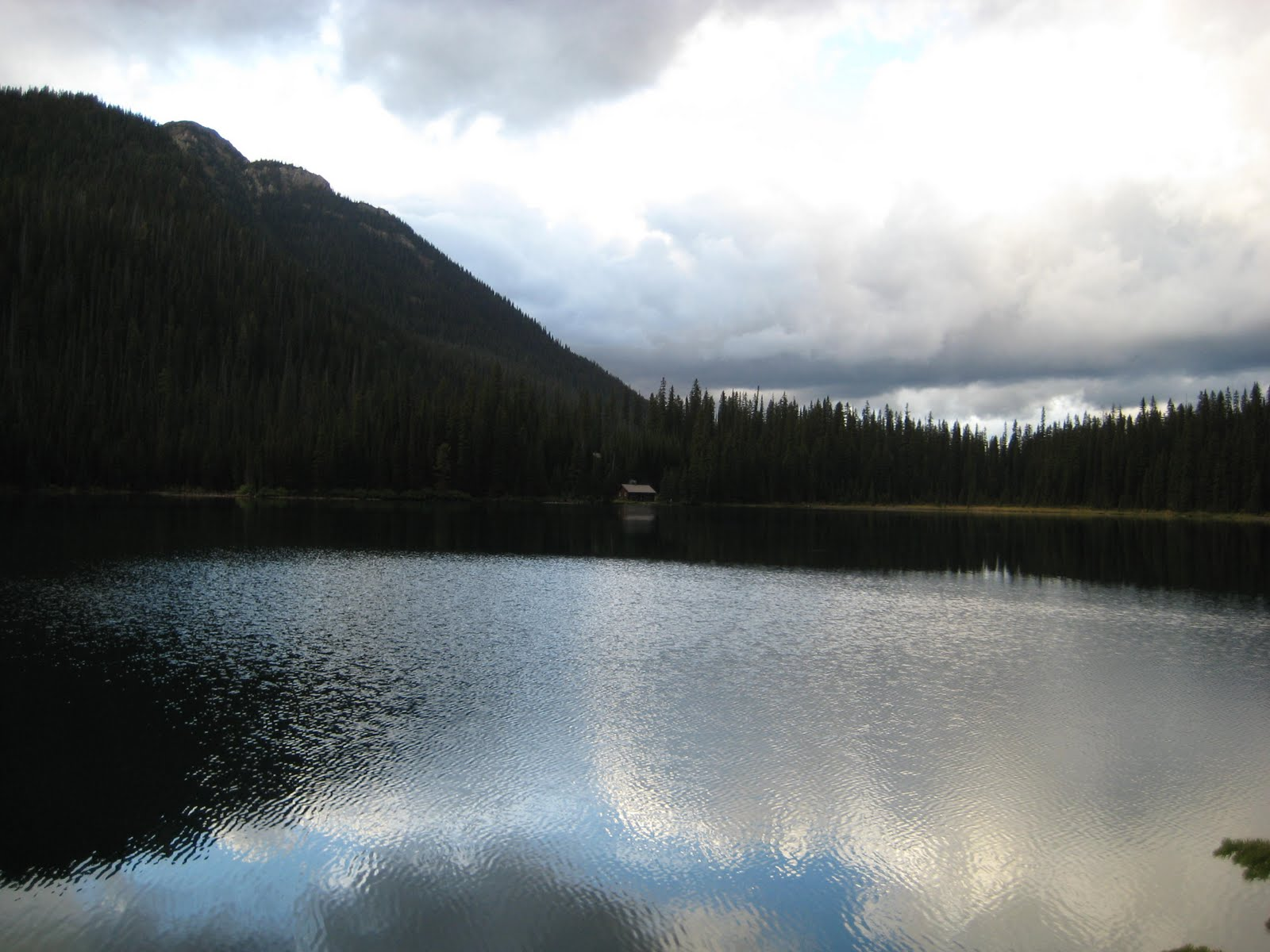
- Fish Lake and cabin
- Interactive map of Top of the World Provincial Park
- Location: British Columbia, Canada
- Nearest city: Kimberley, British Columbia
- Coordinates: 49.849°N 115.403°W
- Governing body: Provincial

Top of the World Provincial Park is a provincial park in British Columbia, Canada.
