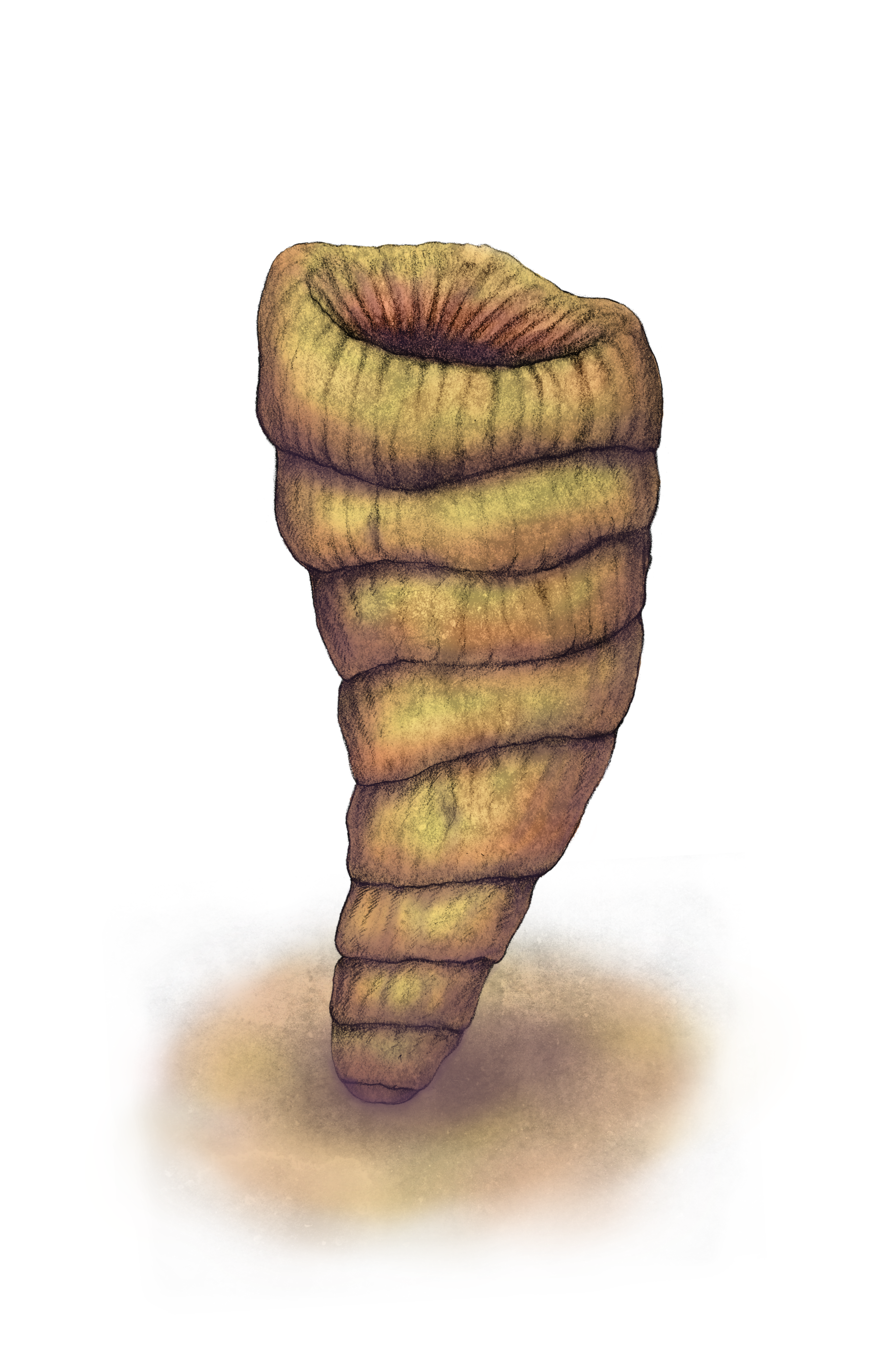
- Artist's restoration

Scientific classification
- Kingdom: Animalia
- Phylum: Porifera
- Class: Demospongiae
- Family: †Anthaspidellidae
- Genus: †Capsospongia; Rigby 1986
- Species: †C. undulata

Binomial name
- †Capsospongia undulata Walcott 1920

= Capsospongia =

Capsospongia Temporal range: Middle Cambrian, Burgess shale

Extinct genus of sponges

Capsospongia, formerly known as Corralia or Corralio, is a middle Cambrian sponge genus known from three specimens in the Burgess Shale. Its type and only species is Capsospongia undulata. It has a narrow base, and consists of bulging rings which get wider farther up the sponge, resulting in a conical shape. Its open top was presumably used to expel water that had passed through the sponge cells and been filtered for nutrients.

Like most sponges, Capsospoingia had a spicular skeleton; long spicules parallel to the growth direction formed columns which were connected by shorter lateral spicules.

== History ==
Capsospongia undulata was named in 1920 by Charles Walcott as Corralia undulata. However, the name was preoccupied by Corralia Roewer, 1913, a member of Opiliones. In 1955, de Laubenfels renamed the genus Corralio, adopting an incorrect spelling of Corralia Walcott had used. In 1986 Keith Rigby established the new genus Capsospongia for it. In 2004, he and Desmond Collins described a third specimen.

C. undulata intersects with the complicated taxonomic history of the anomalocarids. In 1911, Walcott had named two taxa, Peytoia and Laggania, which he interpreted as a jellyfish and a sea cucumber respectively. In 1978, Simon Conway Morris recognized that the mouthparts of Laggania closely resembled Peytoia, but erroneously concluded that this was because Laggania was a composite fossil of a Peytoia and another organism, which he concluded was a sponge and suggested was probably a specimen of C. undulata. However, it was subsequently determined that Laggania and Peytoia were partial specimens of a larger animal, a radiodont, which now bears the name Peytoia.
