= Mobergella =

Mobergella Temporal range: Lower Cambrian

Scientific classification
- Domain: Eukaryota
- Kingdom: Animalia
- Phylum: incertae sedis
- Family: †Mobergellidae
- Genus: †Mobergella; Moberg, 1892

Species
- M. (= Discinella) holsti Moberg, 1892; M. radiolata Bengtson, 1968; M. turgida Bengtson, 1968

Extinct genus of shelled animals

Mobergella is a millimetric Lower Cambrian shelly fossil of unknown affinity, usually preserved in phosphate and particularly well known from Swedish strata, where it is diagnostic of lowermost Cambrian rocks. Originally interpreted as a monoplacophoran, the circular, cap-shaped shell resembles a hyolith operculum, with concentric rings on its upper surface, and seven pairs of internal muscle scars. It is never found in association with a conch, and its affinity therefore remains undetermined. Nevertheless, its heavy musculature does seem to indicate that it functioned as an operculum.

Some specimens bear evidence of healed injuries.

It's also been compared to the Kirengellids, which are probably brachiopods.

== Occurrence ==
The genus is unique to Lower Cambrian strata and has been found throughout the northern hemisphere.
