= Mobergellidae =

Mobergellidae Temporal range: Early Cambrian–Early Middle Cambrian

Scientific classification
- Kingdom: Animalia
- Phylum: incertae sedis
- Family: †Mobergellidae; Missarzhevsky, 1989

Genera
- Discinella Hall, 1872 (type); Mobergella Moberg 1892; Aktugaia; Tateltella Streng & Skovsted 2006; (Others may exist; please expand)

Extinct family of shelled animals

The Mobergellidae are a family of small shelly fossils from the lower Cambrian. The small shells vary widely in shape, but are all bilaterally symmetrical discs with paired muscle scars radiating from the centre of the internal surface.
