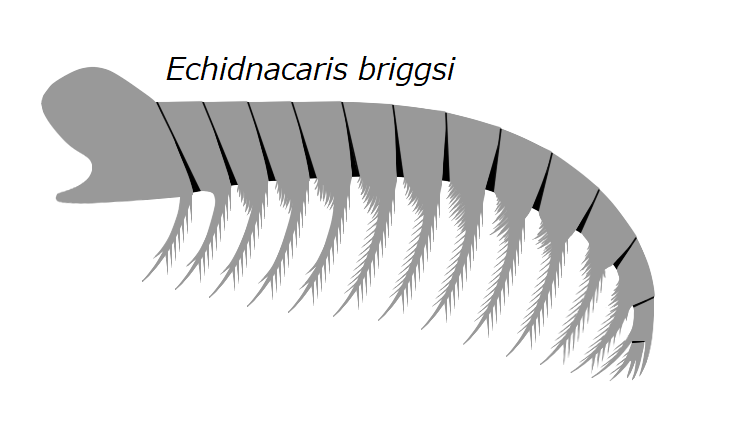
- Diagram of frontal appendage
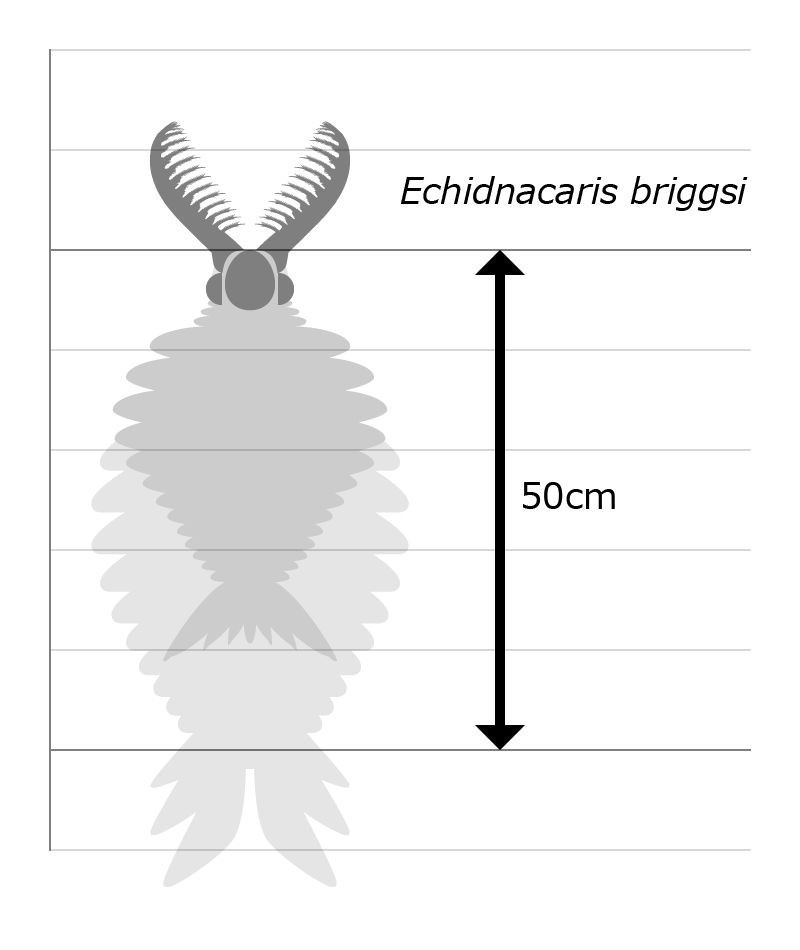
- Speculative body size estimation

Scientific classification
- Kingdom: Animalia
- Stem group: Arthropoda
- Class: †Dinocaridida
- Order: †Radiodonta
- Family: †Tamisiocarididae
- Genus: †Echidnacaris; Paterson, García-Bellido & Edgecombe, 2023
- Species: †E. briggsi

Binomial name
- †Echidnacaris briggsi (Nedin, 1995)

= Echidnacaris =

Echidnacaris Temporal range: Cambrian Stage 4

Extinct genus of tamisiocaridid radiodonts

Echidnacaris briggsi is an extinct species of radiodont known from the Cambrian Stage 4 aged Emu Bay Shale of Australia. Formerly referred to as "Anomalocaris" briggsi, it was placed in the new monotypic genus Echidnacaris in 2023. It is only distantly related to true Anomalocaris, and is instead placed in the family Tamisiocarididae.

== Description ==
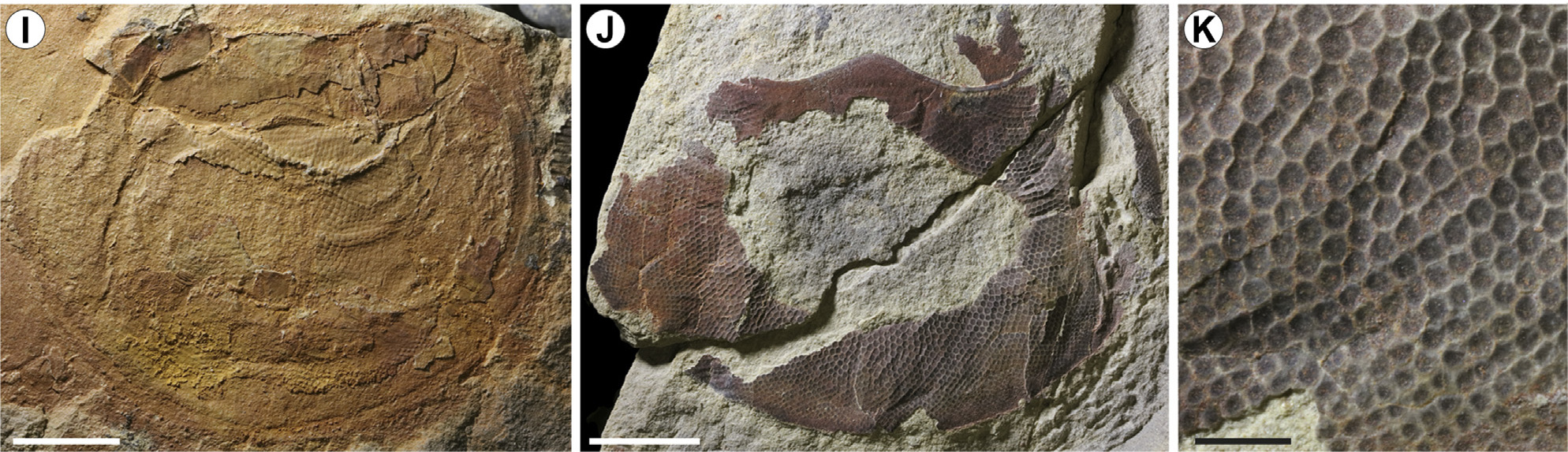
Fossilised compound eyes of Echindacaris from the Emu Bay shale of Australia with preserved individual ommatidia receptors. Scale bar = 5 mm in left and centre images, 1 mm on right

Echidnacaris is primarily known from its frontal appendages which had 13 podomeres. The largest appendages measured up to 17.5 cm (6.9 in) long, which would have belonged to an individual measuring between 33.2–49 cm (1.09–1.61 ft) long. The first few segments of the appendages were substantially taller than they were wide, with podomeres 2-12 bearing long, slender posteriorly curving endites/ventral spines which bore numerous small auxiliary spines. Isolated eyes attributed to the species suggest that they were not stalked, but instead were attached directly to the head, and surrounded by sclerotised structures. There were more than 13,000 lenses in the largest eyes, which were over 3 cm (1.2 in) in diameter. The individual lenses were large, with some exceeding 335 μm (0.335 mm or approximately ^{1}/_{64} of an in) in diameter, which was possibly an adaptation to seeing in low-light waters. The oral cone was triradial with three large plates, with the plates being studded with numerous tubercules.

== Diet ==
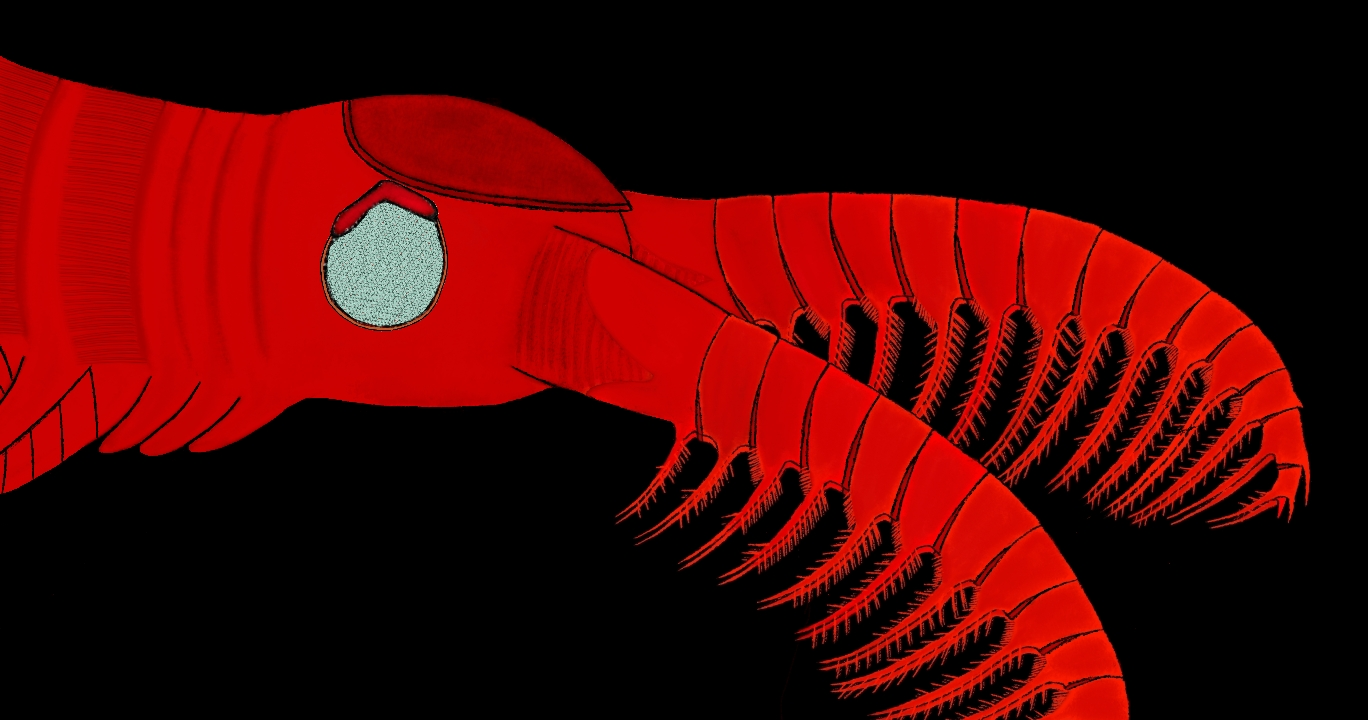
Life restoration of the head of Echidnacaris briggsi, based on known remains

Like other tamisiocaridids, it is suggested to have been a suspension feeder, using its frontal appendages to capture small prey.
