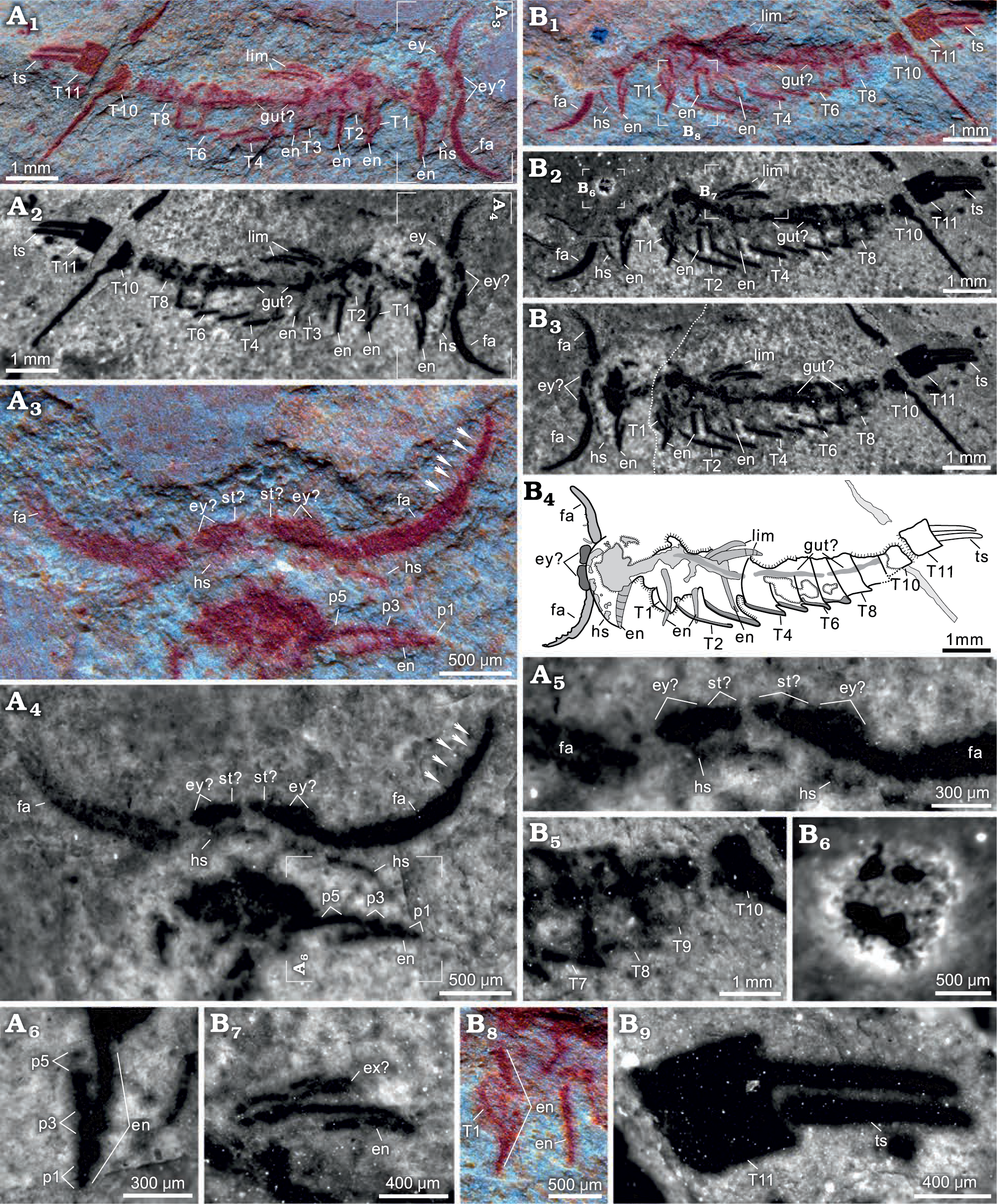
- Holotype specimen

Scientific classification
- Kingdom: Animalia
- Phylum: Euarthropoda
- Order: incertae sedis
- Genus: †Astutuscaris; Jiao et al., 2022
- Species: †A. bispinifer

Binomial name
- †Astutuscaris bispinifer Jiao et al., 2022

= Astutuscaris =

Astutuscaris Temporal range: Cambrian Stage 4

Extinct genus of Cambrian arthropod

Astutuscaris is an extinct genus of small euarthropod with uncertain affinities. It was found in the Chinese Burgess Shale-type Cambrian Stage 4 Guanshan Biota, part of the Wulongqing Formation, which has provided numerous non-trilobite arthropods. The genus contains one species, Astutuscaris bispinifer.

== Discovery and naming ==
The only known specimen is an articulated individual, accessioned as RCP 0002 and its counterpart RCP 0002b at the Research Center of Paleobiology, Yuxi Normal University. It is dorsoventrally compressed and nearly complete. The specimen was found near Lihuazhuang village in siltstone, sandstone, and thin muddy shale beds, situated in the Yiliang County, Kunming in Yunnan Province, southern China. This locality is part of the lower Cambrian Stage 4 Wulongqing Formation (Palaeolenus biozone).

The genus name comes from the Latin astutus, meaning flexible, and caris, meaning shrimp, referring to the fact that it was a marine arthropod. The specific name means "two spines" in Latin, in reference to the pair of terminal spines.

== Description ==
Astutuscaris is a small elongate euarthropod. The body is 8.6 mm (0.34 in) long and 2.2 mm (0.087 in) wide. The most distinctive feature is the first pair of curved horn-like appendages without sturdy spines or elbow articulation. No segmentation is observed. The cephalon is incomplete but seems to be semi-elliptical. It possesses a pair of possible antero-median large eyes. The dorsal exoskeleton is composed of 11 imbricated tergites and is terminated by a pair of sturdy spines. The eleventh tergite is slightly longer than the others and has no pleural spine. There is a robust endopod composed of five segments under the cephalic shield. Four other endopods are observed under the first three tergites. They do not display any clear segmentation. The positioning suggests one pair of appendages per tergite. A limb of the third tergite possibly preserves an exopod. A possible gut is also preserved along the body.

== Affinities ==
Astutuscaris is currently regarded as an indeterminate euarthropod, and additional material is required to clarify its phylogenetic position.

=== Megacheira ===
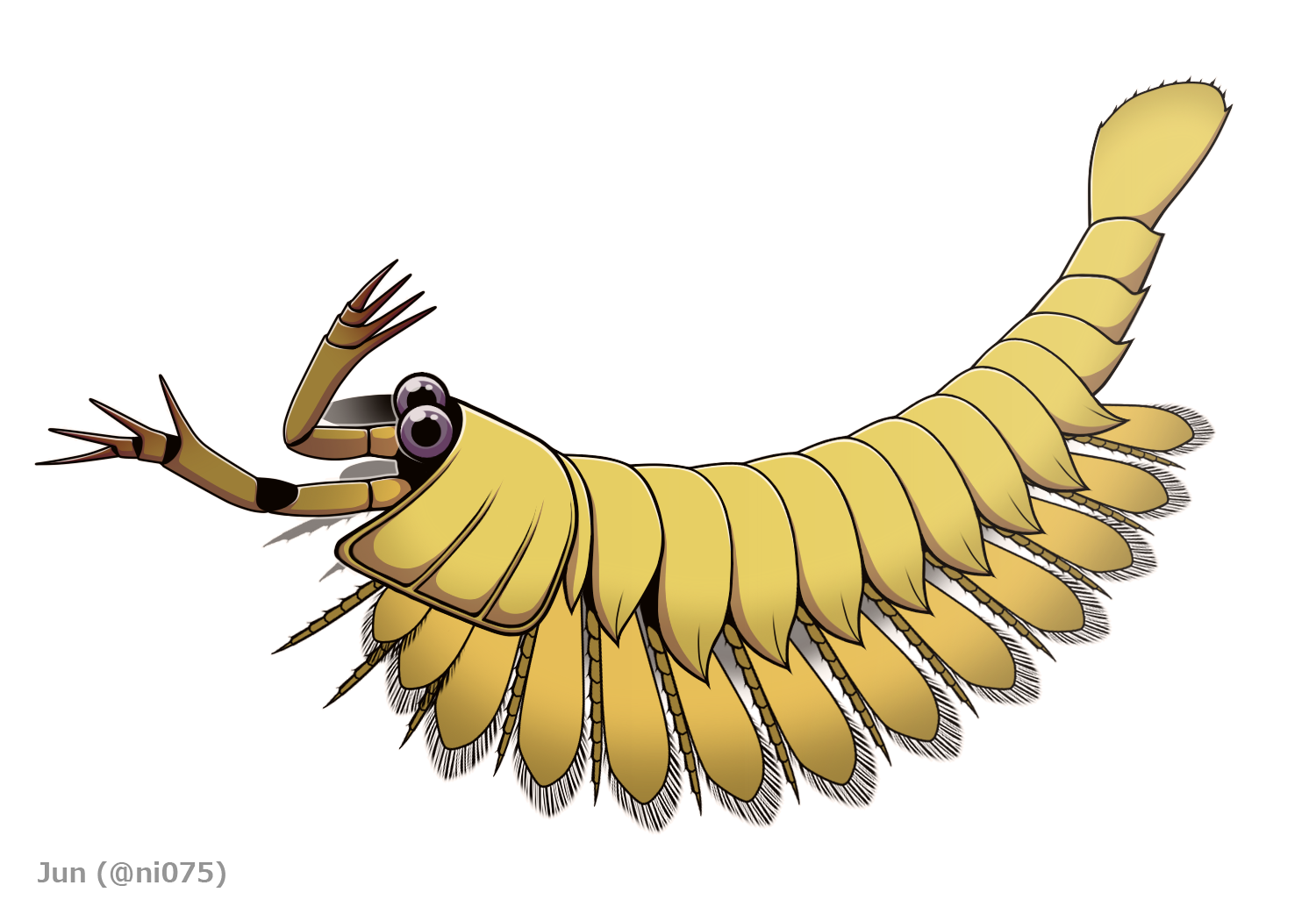
Artistic reconstruction of the similar Yohoia

The small, elongated body, large antero-medially positioned eyes, and the presence of a first pair of great appendages make Astutuscaris superficially similar to megacheirans. It is particularly reminiscent of the genus Yohoia. However, the morphology of the frontalmost appendages, the tergite structure, and the presence of two separate terminal spines distinguish it from this genus.

=== Fuxianhuiida ===
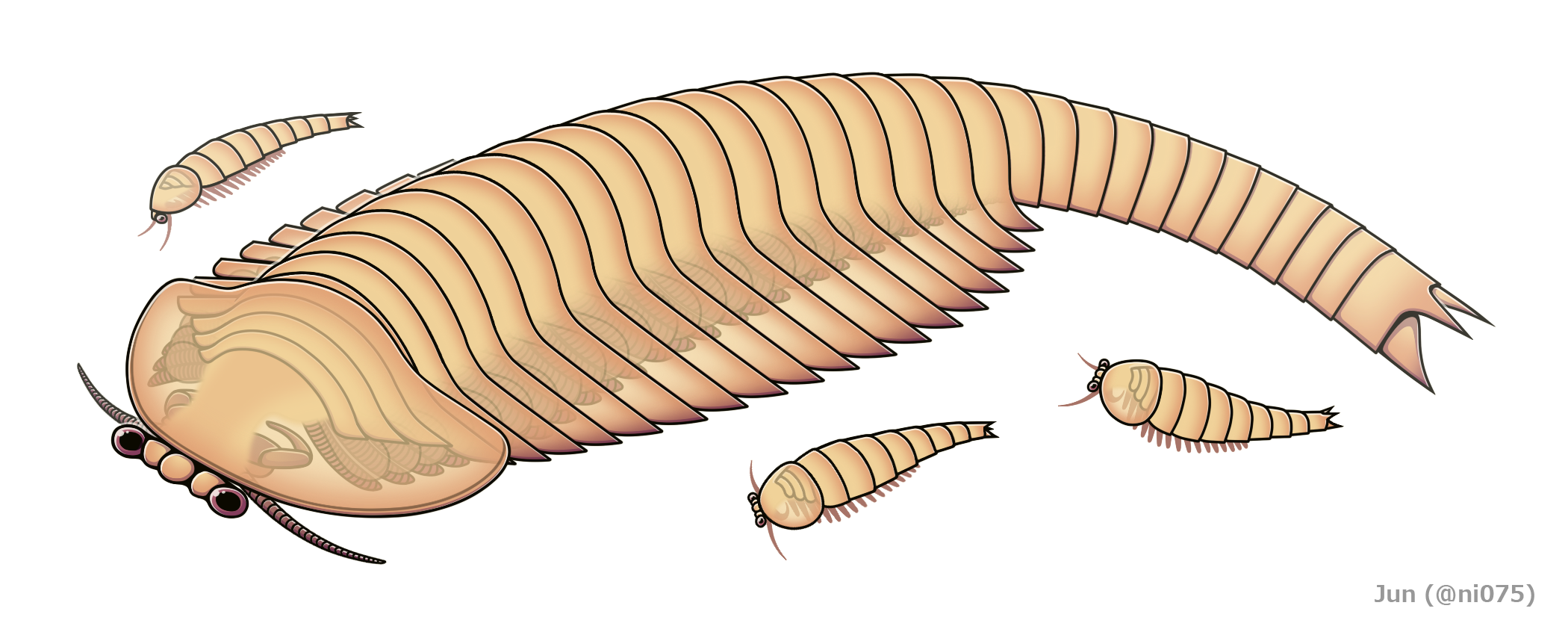
Artistic reconstruction of adult and juvenile Fuxianhuia

Astutuscaris differs from Guangweicaris in its overall body shape, the morphology of its frontalmost appendages, which are not comparable to the antennae of Guangweicaris, and in lacking medial axial spines on the exoskeleton. It is also distinct from juvenile stages of Fuxianhuia, having more trunk tergites, a different appendage organization, and two terminal spines that do not resemble the caudal flukes of Fuxianhuia. Although the morphology of the first limb beneath the head resembles that of Chengjiangocaris, the presence of one pair of appendages beneath each tergite and the terminal spines differentiate Astutuscaris from any member of Fuxianhuiida.

=== Artiopoda ===
The pair of terminal spines in Astutuscaris may represent modified appendages of the terminal somite, similar to those observed in vicissicaudates. If so, Astutuscaris could represent a vicissicaudate-like euarthropod. However, its general anatomy differs from artiopods.

== Ecology ==
Astutuscaris is part of the Guanshan Biota, a Lagerstätte dating back to the Cambrian Stage 4 between the Maotianshan Shales and the Burgess Shale. It represents a marine shallow offshore environment. It was probably affected by cyclic fair weather and storm conditions. It is characterized by abundant brachiopods, which suggests regular mixing between oxygen-enriched water and stagnant bottom water, favoring high nutrient conditions and suspension feeders. The biota provides diverse non-trilobite arthropods like radiodonts (Guanshancaris and Paranomalocaris), fuxianhuiids (Guangweicaris), and enigmatic euarthropods (Lihuacaris).
