= List of Xiaoshiba Biota species =

List of paleobiota

This is a list of the fossils found within the Xiaoshiba Biota.

The Xiaoshiba Biota is a lagerstätte from south China, belonging to the Hongjingshao Formation. It dates to roughly 514 mya, near the end of Cambrian Stage 3. This interval lies between the more famous Maotianshan Shales and Burgess Shale in age.

== Ecdysozoa ==
=== Scalidophora ===
| Genus | Species | Material | Notes | Images |
|---|---|---|---|---|
| Paraselkirkia | P. sinica | Around 200 specimens | Similar to Selkirkia in appearance, likely generalistic in diet | Reconstruction of Paraselkirkia |
| Mafangscolex | M cf. yunnanensis | 13 specimens | Palaeoscolecid | |

=== Panarthropoda ===
==== Lobopodia ====
| Genus | Species | Material | Notes | Images |
|---|---|---|---|---|
| Collinsium | C. ciliosum | Three mostly complete specimens | Related to Acinocricus from North America | |
| Omnidens | O. amplus ("Omnidens qiongqii" is likely synonymous) | Hundreds of oral cones, several frontal appendages | Largest animal of the Cambrian, related to Pambdelurion from Greenland | A partial mouth apparatus of Omnidens, alongside a small trilobite |

==== Arthropoda ====
| Genus | Species | Material | Notes | Images |
|---|---|---|---|---|
| Alacaris | A. mirabilis | Around 40 specimens | Fuxianhuiid, one specimen preserved while moulting | Reconstruction of Alacaris |
| Chengjiangocaris | C. kunmingensis | Numerous specimens | Fuxianhuiid | Reconstruction of Chengjiangocaris |
| Fuxianhuia | F. xiaoshibaensis | Numerous specimens | Fuxianhuiid | Reconstruction of Fuxianhuia |
| Lihuacaris | L. ferox | Six specimens | Indeterminate arthropod, likely a fuxianhuiid | |

===== Hymenocarina =====
| Genus | Species | Material | Notes | Images |
|---|---|---|---|---|
| Clypecaris | C. serrata | Multiple complete specimens | First pair of appendages specialised for predation, carapace serrated | Reconstructions of Clypecaris serrata |
| Pectocaris | P. paraspatiosa; P. eurypetala; P. spatiosa; P. inopinata | 12 specimens of P. paraspatiosa, 19 specimens of P. spatiosa, 2 specimens of P. eurypetala and one specimen of P. inopinata | All species of Pectocaris present | Pectocaris species. Left to right, top to bottom: P. spatiosa, P. erypetala, P. inopinata, P. paraspatiosa |
| Jugatacaris? | J. sp? | One partial specimen | Unclear whether it belongs to the genus due to its fragmentary nature | Reconstruction of Jugatacaris |

===== Artiopoda =====
| Genus | Species | Material | Notes | Images |
|---|---|---|---|---|
| Sidneyia | S. minor | Two specimens | Smaller tail fluke than other species | Reconstruction of Sidneyia minor |
| Zhangshania | Z. typica | Numerous specimens of all ages | Synonymous with "Parazhangshania" | |
| Zhiwenia | Z. coronata | Four specimens | Basal artiopod, related to Acanthomeridion | |

== Spiralia ==
=== Annelida ===
| Genus | Species | Material | Notes | Images |
|---|---|---|---|---|
| Xiaoshibachaeta | X. biodiversa | One mostly complete fossil | Earliest fossil of a burrowing annelid known | |

=== Mollusca ===
| Genus | Species | Material | Notes | Images |
|---|---|---|---|---|
| Wiwaxia | W. foliosa | Six specimens | Lacks spines, unlike W. corrugata | Model of a juvenile Wiwaxia corrugata, somewhat similar to Wiwaxia foliosa in its lack of spines |

== Green and red algae ==
| Genus | Species | Material | Notes | Images |
|---|---|---|---|---|
| Doulia | D. rara | Two specimens | | |
| Eolaminaria | E. simigladiola | Three specimens | | |
| Rugophyca | R. longa | Eight specimens | | |
| Singulariphyca | S. ramosa | Thirty-five specimens | | |

== Miscellaneous/Enigmatic ==
| Genus | Species | Material | Notes | Images |
|---|---|---|---|---|
| Protomelission? | P. sp.? | Twelve specimens | Assignment to the genus dubious due to differing preservation methods | Microfossil of Protomelission from Wirrealpa. Reproduced from Zhang et al., 2021 |

== See also ==
- List of Guanshan Biota species
- Paleobiota of the Maotianshan Shales
