= List of Guanshan Biota species =

List of paleobiota

This article lists the fauna of the Guanshan Biota.

The Guanshan Biota is a collection of organisms from Cambrian China within the Wulongqing Formation, dating to near the beginning of Cambrian Stage 4. It is distinguished by its shallow depositional environment and large quantities of brachiopods.

== Ecdysozoa ==
=== Scalidophora ===
Genus	Species	Material	Notes	Images
Guanduscolex	G. minor	Several specimens	Digestive tract preserved	
Palaeoscolex	P. xinglongensis	Two incomplete specimens	Also similar to Sahascolex	
Mafangscolex	M. cf. yunnanensis	3 fragmentary specimens	Unclear whether it belongs to this species due to lack of preserved mouthparts	
Yunnanoscolex	Y. magnus	Around 50 specimens, most fragmentary	Unusually large for palaeoscolecids	
Wudingscolex	W. sapushanensis	Two specimens	Similar to Yunnanoscolex	
Paramaotianshania	P. zijunia	15 specimens, 3 with introverts preserved	Differentiated from Maotianshania by hair-like protrusions and a larger size	
Corynetis	C. fortis	Over 100 specimens, around 10 being well-preserved	Has an unusual looped intestine	Reconstruction of Corynetis
Xiaoheiqingella	X. sp	One specimen	Likely a new species, however the lack of specimens means no name has been provided	Reconstruction of X. peculiaris
Eximipriapulus?	?E. sp	Four specimens	Specimens all found inside hyolith shells, suggesting a "hermiting" lifestyle for the genus.	Reconstruction of Eximipriapulus

=== Panarthropoda ===
Genus	Species	Material	Notes	Images
Guanshancaris	G. kunmingensis	Multiple frontal appendages and oral cones	An amplectobeluid radiodont, formerly placed within Anomalocaris.	Reconstruction of a Guanshancaris frontal appendage
Paranomalocaris	P. simplex; P. multisegmentalis	Multiple frontal appendages	Unusually similar to the frontal appendages of Kylinxia, possibly a relative	Reconstructions of both Paranomalocaris species' appendages
Astutuscaris	A. bispinifer	One mostly complete specimen	Placement within Arthropoda uncertain, no limbs other than frontal appendages preserved	
Hallucigenia	H. fortis; H. hongmeia; H. sparsa	Dozens of isolated sclerites, a few complete specimens	One of the most widely distributed lobopodians	Reconstructions of H. fortis, H. hongmeia, and H. sparsa to scale.
Guangweicaris	G. spinatus	Over 150 specimens	Most recent known fuxianhuiid	Fossil of Guangweicaris
Leanchoilia	L. ilecebrosa	Several specimens	Also known from the Maotianshan Shales	Restoration of L. superlata
Tuzoia	T. sinensis; T. ?retifera; T. tylodensa	Multiple carapaces	Known from all around the world	Reconstruction of Tuzoia
Isoxys	I. wudingensis; I. minor	Multiple carapaces	Wide distribution, one of the most common Cambrian arthropods globally	Reconstruction of I. curvirostratus
Longquania	L. spinosa	Several partial specimens	Possibly within Trilobitomorpha	
Branchiocaris	B. yiliangensis	Several specimens	One of several species from China	Reconstruction of B. pretiosa
Liangshanella	L. liangshanensis; L. yunnanensis	Multiple carapaces	Also known from the Burgess Shale	Fossil of L. burgessensis
Houlongdongella	H. disulcata	Multiple carapaces		
Neokunmingella	N. minuta	Multiple carapaces		
Waptia	W. sp	Several partial specimens	Mainly known from the Burgess Shale	Reconstruction of W. fieldensis
Parapeytoia	P. sp	Several appendages	Originally classed as a radiodont	Holotype fossil of Parapeytoia

==== Artiopoda ====
Genus	Species	Material	Notes	Images
Sinoburius	S. sp	Well-preserved specimens	Mainly known from the Maotianshan Shales	Reconstruction, in dorsal and ventral views
Panlongia	P. tetranodusa	Multiple specimens	Assigned to Nektaspida in 2024	Panlongia tetranodusa reconstruction
Redlichia	R. mansuyi; R. yunnanensis; R. noetlingi; R. mai; R. chinensis; R. kaiyangensis	Hundreds of fossils	Most diverse genus in the Guanshan Biota, R. mansuyi specimens preserve gut structures	Fossil of R. chinensis
Palaeolenus	P. lantenoisi; P. douvillei	Hundreds of fossils	Multiple specimens preserve gut structures	A pair of P. douvillei fossils
Megapalaeolenus	M. deprati	Eight specimens	Merged into Palaeolenus multiple times	
Yuehsienszella	Y. szechuanensis	Multiple specimens	Found in various other formations in Asia	
Kootenia	K. sp		Mainly known from the Burgess Shale	Fossil of Kootenia from the Burgess Shale
Breviredlichia	B. sp	Multiple specimens	Has very large genal spines	
Naraoiidae indet.	Unapplicable	3 specimens	Similar to both naraoiids and Emucaris	
Sidneyidae indet.	Unapplicable	One nearly complete specimen	Differing tail fan and tergite shapes distinguish it from Sidneyia	
Bailongia	B. longicaudata	One complete specimen	Unclear position within Artiopoda	Fossil and diagram of Bailongia

== Spiralia ==
Genus	Species	Material	Notes	Images
Bryozoa indet?	Unapplicable	One specimen	Possible bryozoan, earliest record of such if it is one.	
Gaoloufangchaeta	G. bifurcus	One mostly complete specimen	Earliest member of Errantia known	Holotype fossil of Gaoloufangchaeta
Guanshanchaeta	G. felicia	One specimen	First annelid from Cambrian China found	

=== Brachiopoda ===
Genus	Species	Material	Notes	Images
Linevitus	L. malongensis	Several specimens	Some specimens preserve helens	
Heliomedusa	H. minuta	Several specimens	Soft tissues such as the lophophore are preserved.	Fossil of H. orienta
Diandongia	D. pista	Over 200 specimens	Likely epifaunal due to its very long pedicle.	Fossil of Diandongia pista
Acanthotretella	A. decaius	Around 15 specimens	Likely epifaunal similar to Diandongia above.	
Eoobolus	E. malongensis	Around 700 specimens	Formerly placed within Lingulellotreta	
Nisusia	N. sp	6 specimens	A very rare calcareous brachiopod	
Kutorgina	K. sp	8 specimens	A very rare calcareous brachiopod	
Neobolus	N. wulongqingensis	Thousands of specimens	Some fossils preserve unusual tubes, which are likely parasites	Various Neobolus fossils
Westonia	W. sp	Over 500 specimens	Most common in the higher assemblages of the biota	
Linnarssonia	L. sp	Around 60 specimens	Rarest non-calcareous brachiopod in the Guanshan Biota	Possible Linnarssonia fossil
Schizopholis	S. sp	Multiple specimens		
Palaeobolus	P. sp	Multiple specimens	Closely related to lingulids	
Acrothele	A. rara	Multiple specimens		

== Deuterostomia ==
Genus	Species	Material	Notes	Images
Vetulicola	V. gangtoucunensis; V. longbaoshanensis	Hundreds of specimens	The two recorded species may be synonymous with each other.	Fossil of V. cuneata
Wudingeocrinus	W. rarus	Several specimens	Similar to a genus from the Balang fauna	
Kunmingeocrinus	K. cupuliformis	Two specimens	Possibly weakly biomineralised	
Phlogites	P. sp	Several specimens	Possibly synonymous with Cheungkongella?	Reconstruction of Phlogites
Eldonioidea indet.	Unapplicable	Over 30 specimens	Possibly within Rotadiscidae	

== Enigmatic/Miscellaneous ==
Genus	Species	Material	Notes	Images
Dinomischidae indet?	Unapplicable	One specimen	Closely resembles Xianguangia, may instead be a cnidarian	
Allonnia	A. tenuis	Hundreds of specimens	Member of Chancelloriidae, possibly sponge relatives?	Reconstruction of Allonnia
Sinoflabrum	S. antiquum	Several specimens	Similar to both Ediacaran biota and sponges	Fossil of Sinoflabrum
Guangweia	G. cheni	30 specimens, 10 well-preserved	Similar in form to the Ediacaran biota	
Nidelric	N. gaoloufangensis	Multiple spines	An enigmatic animal, possibly related to the chancelloriids	

=== Porifera ===
Genus	Species	Material	Notes	Images
Crumillospongia	C. biporosa	Several specimens	Known from multiple sites around the world.	
Choia	C. sp.	Several specimens	Known from multiple sites such as the Burgess Shale.	Reconstruction of C. carteri, as according to the Fezouata specimens
Paraleptomitella	P. sp.	Many specimens	The most common sponge in the Guanshan Biota.	
Archaeocyatha indet?	Unapplicable	Two specimens	Unusually similar to vauxiid sponges, suggesting a relationship between the two	

=== Cnidaria ===
Genus	Species	Material	Notes	Images
Sphenothallus	S. sp.	Many specimens	Possibly a conulariid.	Holdfast of an Ordovician Sphenothallus
Gangtoucunia	G. aspera	Around 80 specimens	Identified as a cnidarian in 2022.	Fossil of Gangtoucunia

== See also ==
- List of Xiaoshiba Biota species
- Paleobiota of the Maotianshan Shales
