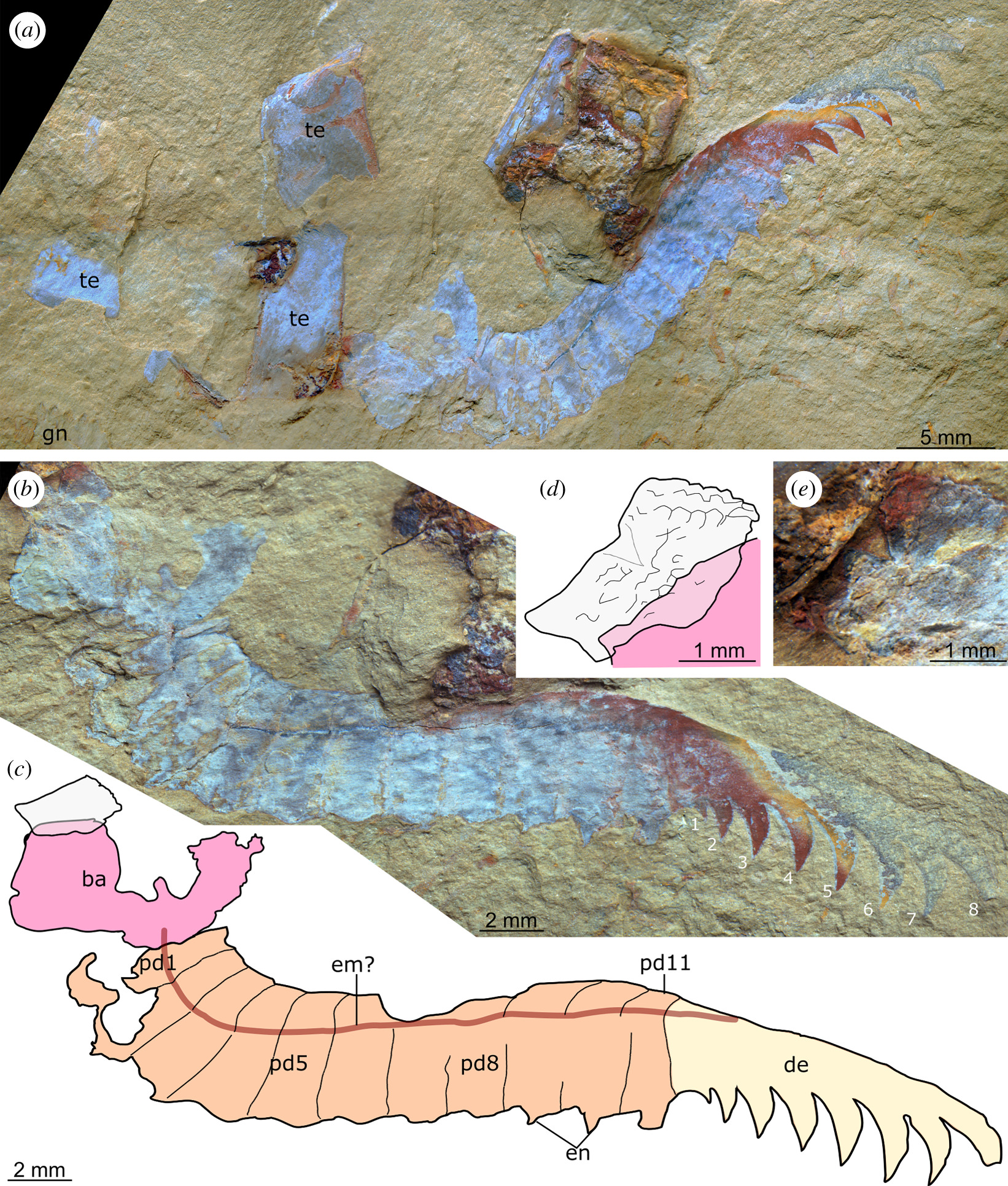
- Holotype of Lihuacaris

Scientific classification
- Kingdom: Animalia
- Phylum: Arthropoda
- Genus: †Lihuacaris; Jiao et al., 2021
- Species: †L. ferox

Binomial name
- †Lihuacaris ferox Jiao et al., 2021

= Lihuacaris =

Lihuacaris Temporal range: Cambrian Stage 4

Extinct Cambrian arthropod

Lihuacaris is a genus of possible fuxianhuiid from the Cambrian Guanshan biota of China. It contains one species, Lihuacaris ferox. It is only known from isolated appendages, which resemble both the raptorial appendages of radiodonts and the endopods of deuteropods, such as chengjiangocarid fuxianhuiids.

== Description ==
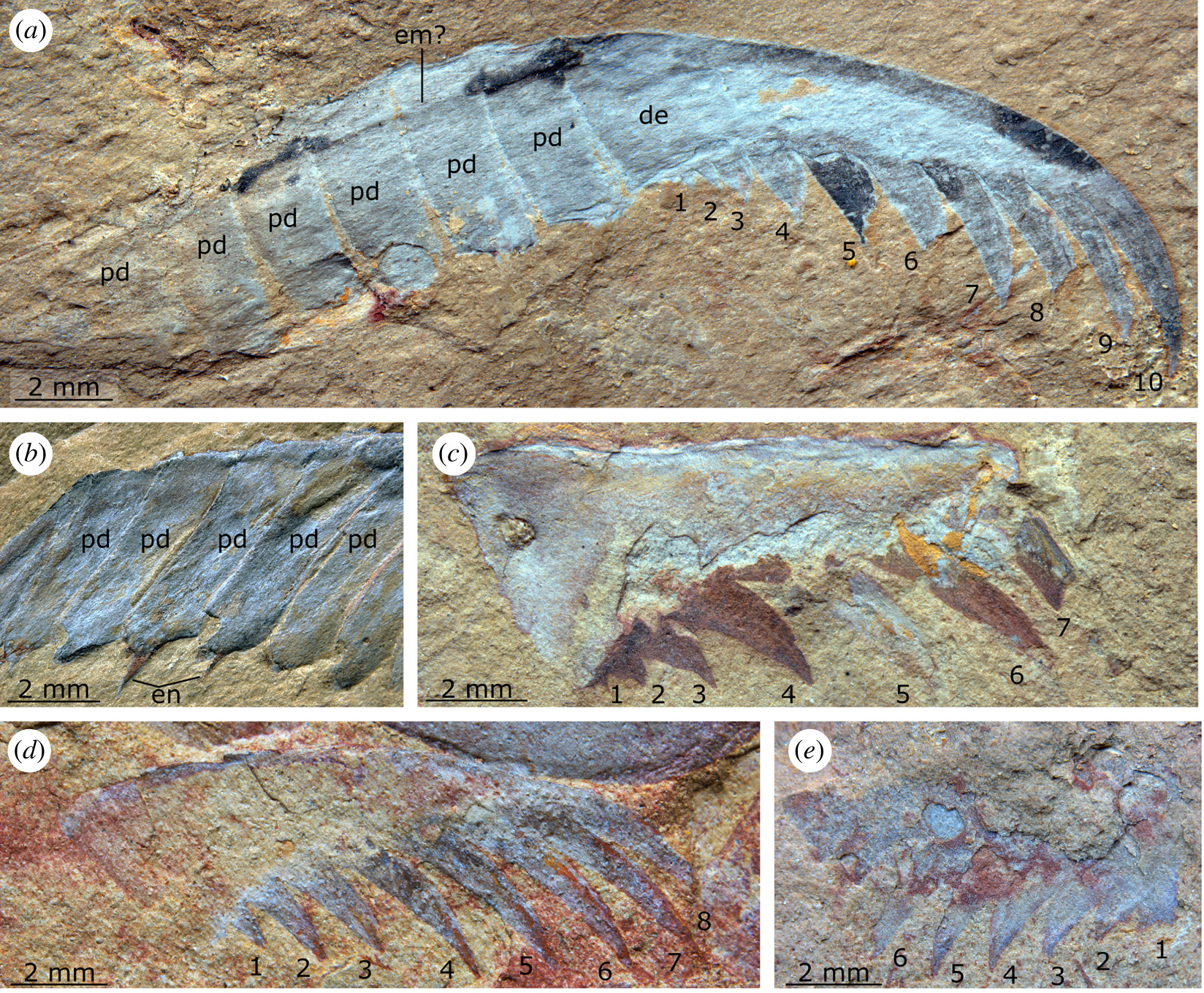
Paratype specimens of Lihuacaris

The holotype appendage of Lihuacaris has a rectangular base, bearing eleven podomeres and a long spined distal element. Away from the base, the appendage curves about fifty degrees, alongside the podomeres becoming longer and thinner. The appendage remains straight afterwards, with the final podomere being trapezoid-shaped due to becoming thinner dorsally (on the top). Podomeres seven to nine bear paired (as seen in a fragmentary specimen) triangular endites on their undersides, with podomere ten being associated with a similar structure. The distal element is about as long as the final six podomeres, and bears eight to ten spines along its underside which increase in length towards the tip. Two incomplete elements show smaller and more hooked spines relative to the holotype, alongside having more tightly packed spines. A dark trace is visible running along the long axis of the appendage from the first podomere all the way to the distal element, converging towards the dorsal margin. Its position and direction suggest that this is likely an extensor muscle.

== Classification ==
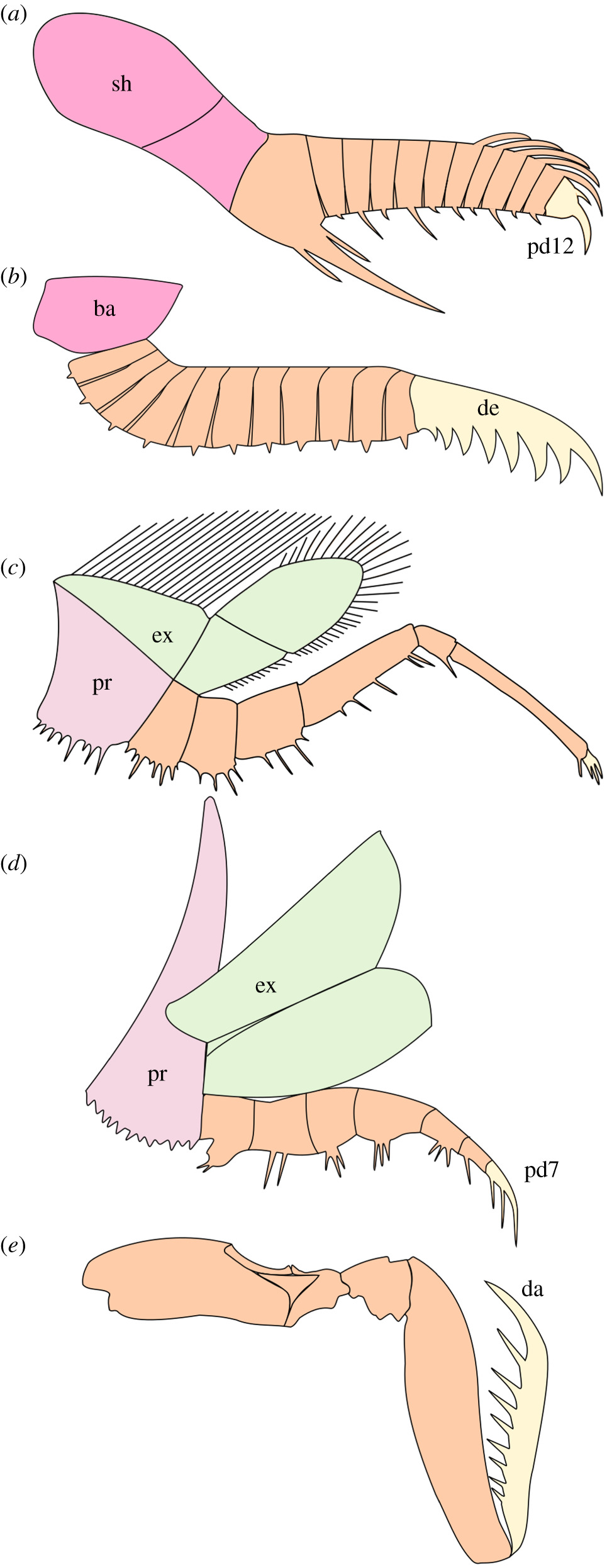
Comparison of appendages from multiple arthropod taxa to those of Lihuacaris

Due to the fragmentary nature of Lihuacaris, its classification beyond Arthropoda is unclear. While amplectobeluid radiodonts have appendages with the same podomere number, endite and general appendage shape and arthrodial membrane (membrane connecting podomeres) shape, the presence of a long distal element with multiple endites is unprecedented within the group, with only the dubiously radiodontan genus Caryosyntrips having a similar structure. However, the appendages in that genus have clear podomeres and connect directly to the head, precluding their identity as distal elements like in Lihuacaris. Furthermore, while amplectobeluids display a "dorsal kink" similar to that of Lihuacaris, they have a much more abrupt bend in a single podomere instead of over multiple.

Fuxianhuiids are a better match, with some species like Xiaocaris having very similar appendages down to even the position of the extensor muscle, although the long distal element is not known from any fuxianhuiid genera. Furthermore, the holotype of Lihuacaris is associated with multiple tergites similar to those of the already-known genus Guangweicaris, alongside a protopodite of a gnathobase similar to that of a possible Alacaris specimen.

Some artiopods such as Sidneyia also bear similar appendages to Lihuacaris, however theirs have fewer podomeres, gnathobases and distinct types of podomeres. Most critically, almost all post-antennal artiopod appendages are biramous, while that of Lihuacaris shows no such structure. Lihuacaris's appendages also resemble those of Kiisortoqia and Bushizheia in having triangular endites and many podomeres, however these taxa lack a rectangular shaft podomere and a long distal element. While Lihuacaris is certainly an arthropod, and likely fairly basal, its exact position is uncertain. Depending on where the appendage was attached, it may be either a radiodont (with protocerebral appendages), a basal deuteropod (with deutocerebral appendages) or a more crownward deuteropod like a fuxianhuiid (with post-deutocerebral appendages).
