= Pisinnocaris =

Pisinnocaris Temporal range: Cambrian Stage 3

Scientific classification
- Kingdom: Animalia
- Phylum: Arthropoda
- Order: †Fuxianhuiida
- Genus: †Pisinnocaris; Hou and Bergström, 1998
- Species: †P. subconigera

Binomial name
- †Pisinnocaris subconigera Hou and Bergström, 1998

Extinct Cambrian arthropod

Pisinnocaris is a genus of Cambrian fuxianhuiid from the Maotianshan Shales of China. It was considered to be an enigmatic arthropod in its original description, then synonymised with Fuxianhuia in a 2018 paper, then redescribed and confirmed to be valid in a 2026 paper. Its only species is Pisinnocaris subconigera.

== Description ==
Pisinnocaris has twelve segments, the least of any fuxianhuiid, with the carapace making up about a quarter of the body length and overlapping the shortened (roughly six times wider than long) four segments of the prothorax. This carapace bears an anterior sclerite which has two stalked eyes, with these being partially covered by the carapace. Post-mortem compression of the carapace has resulted in some of the fossils bearing lateral wrinkles, suggesting that the carapace was slightly swollen in the front-middle region. Pisinnocaris has antennae with ten segments which slowly decrease in width/length ratio, meaning the antennae transition from moniliform to clavate in appearance. Behind the antennae, there are two specialised posterior appendages and a hypostome, although their poor preservation means exact details are uncertain.

Each of the segments in the prothorax has a pair of biramous appendages, meanwhile those in the opisthothorax have four pairs each. These appendages have flap-like exopods and endopods with at least ten segments, all of which bear an endite (projection) medially. The final podomere of the endopod is triangular, similar to that of Guangweicaris. The opisthothorax is composed of four segments, slowly decreasing in size towards the posterior, with the fifth tergite being largest. Each has a backwards-pointing keel alongside overlapping the next tergite along the body. Finally, the abdomen is composed of four tapering limbless segments, with the last being rectangular and bearing two leaf-shaped flukes.

== Classification ==
Pisinnocaris is unique among fuxianhuiids for its unusually low segment count, with only 12 segments in total. Alongside this, it is the only fuxianhuiid to have four segments in its prothorax. This, alongside a combination of a tapering body and limbless abdominal segments, means its exact position within Fuxianhuiida is unclear. While it was suggested to be a juvenile Fuxianhuia in a 2018 paper due to association with that species and a smaller size, Pisinnocaris shows clear differences in segmentation and shape to Fuxianhuia, suggesting the genus is distinct.
