= Arthropod head problem =

Dispute concerning the evolution of arthropods

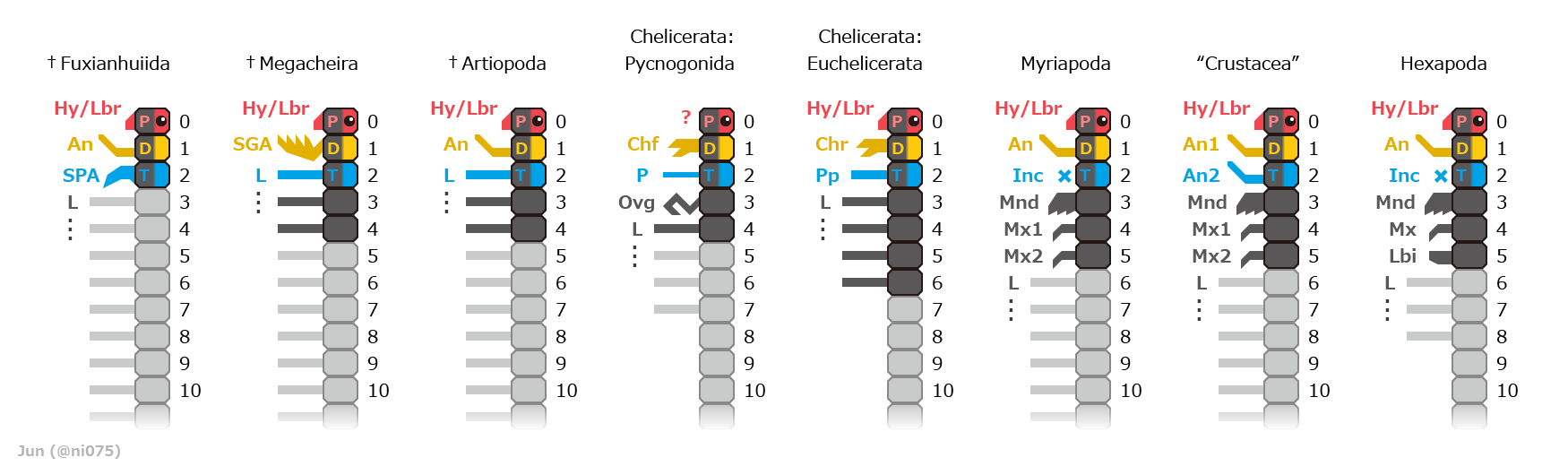
Formation of anterior segments across arthropod taxa based on gene expression and neuroanatomical observations, Note the chelicera(Ch) and chelifore(Chf) arose from somite 1 and thus correspond to the first antenna(An/An1) of other arthropods.

The (pan)arthropod head problem is a long-standing zoological dispute concerning the segmental composition of the heads of the various arthropod groups, and how they are evolutionarily related to each other. While the dispute has historically centered on the exact make-up of the insect head, it has been widened to include other living arthropods, such as chelicerates, myriapods, and crustaceans, as well as fossil forms, such as the many arthropods known from exceptionally preserved Cambrian faunas. While the topic has classically been based on insect embryology, a great deal of developmental molecular data has become available. Dozens of proposed solutions to the problem have been published, dating back to at least 1897, and several in the 2000s.

The arthropod head problem is popularly known as the endless dispute, the title of a famous paper on the subject by Jacob G. Rempel in 1975, referring to its seemingly intractable nature. Although some progress has been made since that time, the precise nature of especially the labrum and the pre-oral region of arthropods remain controversial.

A 2022 study suggested that the "question of homology of segmental structures in extant arthropod heads has been resolved in the past 20 years", with general agreement of a tripartite division of the head and the homology between the limbs of these head segments among living arthropods, though questions remain as to the relationship and homologies of the head anatomy of living arthropods to those of extinct groups like radiodonts.

== Background ==
It would be too bad if the question of head segmentation ever should be finally settled; it has been for so long such fertile ground for theorizing that arthropodists would miss it as a field for mental exercise.

— R.E. Snodgrass, 1960

Some key events in the evolution of the arthropod body resulted from changes in certain Hox genes' DNA sequences. The trunks of arthropods comprise repeated segments, which are typically associated with various structures such as a pair of appendages, apodemes for muscle attachment, ganglia and (at least embryologically) coelomic cavities. While many arthropod segments are modified to a greater or lesser extent (for example, only three of the insect thorax and abdominal segments typically bear appendages), arthropodists widely assume that all of the segments were nearly identical in the ancestral state. However, while one can usually readily see the segmental organisation of the trunks of adult arthropods, that of the head is much less obvious. Arthropod heads are typically fused capsules that bear a variety of complex structures such as the eyes, antennae and mouth parts.

The challenge that the arthropod head problem has to address is to what extent the various structures of the arthropod head can be resolved into a set of hypothetical ancestral segments. Given the high compaction and complexity of adult arthropod heads, much attention has been directed towards understanding the developmental processes that give rise to them, in the hope that they will reveal their segmental organisation more clearly.

== Head components ==
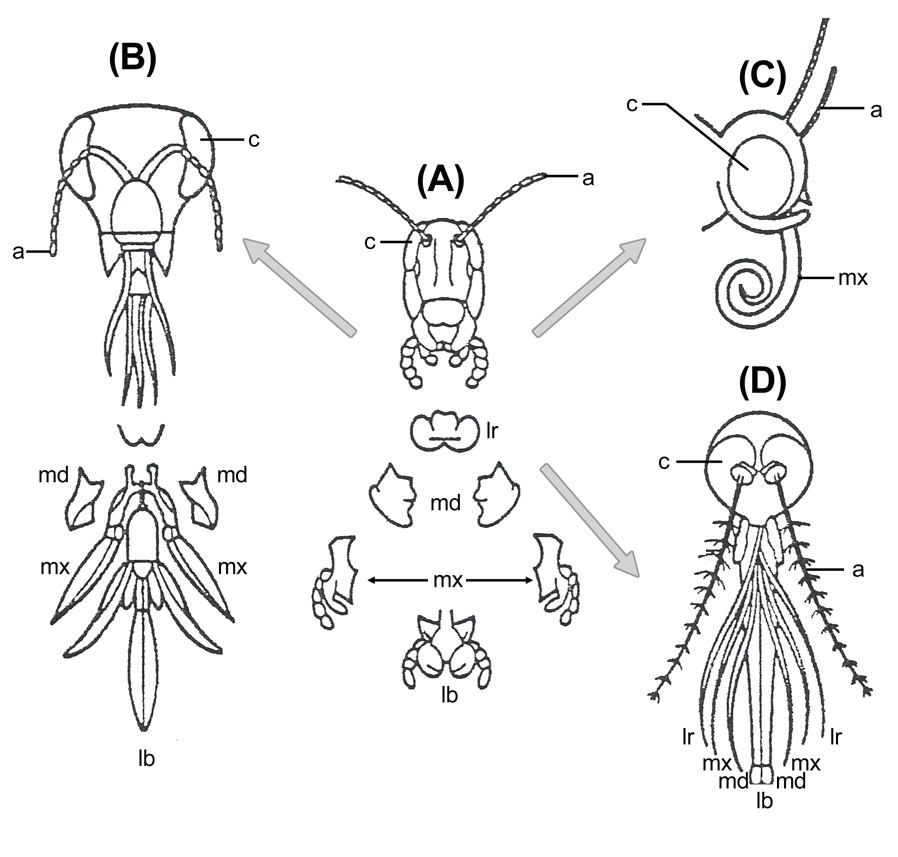
Insect head parts. Legend: a, antennae; c, compound eye; lb, labium; lr, labrum; md, mandibles; mx, maxillae.

Insect anatomy

A typical insect head possesses a pair of antennae; eyes; mandibles, labrum, maxillae and labium (the latter four forming the cluster of "mouth parts", no. 32. in the diagram). Lying above the oesophagus is the brain or supraesophageal ganglion, divided into three pairs of ganglia: the protocerebrum, deutocerebrum and tritocerebrum from front to back (collectively no. 5 in the diagram). Nerves from the protocerebrum lead to the large compound eyes; from the deutocerebrum to the antennae; and from the tritocerebrum to the labrum and stomatogastric nervous system. Circum-oesophageal connectives lead from the tritocerebrum around the gut to connect the brain to the ventral ganglionated nerve cord: nerves from the first three pairs of ganglia lead to the mandibles, maxillae and labium, respectively. The position of the mouth and the circum-oesophageal connectives allows a distinction to be made between pre- and post-oral structures; although it should be borne in mind that because structures can move around during development, a pre-oral position of a structure in the adult does not necessarily prove that its developmental origin is from there. The myriapod head is very similar to that of the insects.

The crustacean head is broadly similar to that of the insects, but possesses, in addition, a second pair of antennae that are innervated from the tritocerebrum. In place of the labium, crustaceans possess a second pair of maxillae.

Chelicerate (sea spider, horseshoe crab, arachnid) head structures differ considerably from those of mandibulates (i.e. insects, crustaceans and myriapods); they possess eyes and a single pair of grasping appendages innervated from the brain, plus a labrum-like structure. Behind the mouth lies another pair of mouthparts, the pedipalps, and behind them lie the series of walking limbs. In chelicerates, the leg-bearing segments are fused with the anterior segments to form a prosoma, so that in living arthropods a distinct head only exists in mandibulates.

== The acron concept ==
The arthropod head problem has until recently been predicated on the Articulata theory, i.e. that the arthropods and annelids are close relatives. Although arthropods are essentially direct developers that do not possess a trochophore-like larva, the annelids do. During annelid metamorphosis, segments are added close to the posterior of the body, behind the mouth; whereas the brain is derived from the episphere or region in front of the mouth. Recognition of this led to the concept of a primary, non-segmental component of the body in annelids known as the acron being developed, from which the brain is ultimately derived. Because the arthropod and annelid heads, in the light of the Articulata theory, were assumed to be structurally homologous in some way, the arthropod head was also often considered to incorporate a non-segmental acronal component. Taking the homology between annelid and arthropod heads at face value, Swedish workers such as Hanström and Holmgren assumed that a large part of the arthropod head must correspond to the acron, a view followed later by several prominent American insect workers such as Butt and Snodgrass. They proposed that all pre-oral structures in insects were non-segmental, although such a view is at odds with the preoral position of apparently bona fide appendages such as the antennae. A less extreme set of theories propose that only the protocerebrum and associated structures should be considered to be acronal.

The view that the arthropod head must contain an acronal remnant has been shaken by the revision of protostome phylogeny, which has dismantled the Articulata and placed the arthropods together with a group of unsegmented worms often referred to as the Cycloneuralia within Ecdysozoa. All members of Ecdysozoa are direct developers without a trochophore, and the cycloneuralians have terminal mouths. As a result, the idea of the arthropods having inherited a preoral acron from their ancestors seems less likely.

== Molecular development and the arthropod head problem ==
Expression of Hox genes in the body segments of different groups of arthropod. The Hox genes 7, 8, and 9 correspond in these groups but are shifted (by heterochrony) by up to three segments. Segments with maxillopeds have Hox gene 7. Fossil trilobites probably had three body regions, each with a unique combination of Hox genes.

The study of how developmental genes are expressed during embryogenesis has become an important new tool in the last twenty years for understanding the structure and evolution of morphology. The arthropod head problem has been tackled in three main ways in this regard, first by using genetic segmental markers to probe the obscure region in front of the mouth, especially in insects; second by looking at Hox gene expression patterns to detect patterns of homology among different arthropods; and third, by studying gene expression in particular features (especially the labrum) to determine its appendiculate or other status. Because all arthropods have the same complement of nine Hox loci, the morphological diversification observed is caused by heterochrony, meaning that the genes are expressed at different times.

== Areas of agreement ==
As of 2022, it is now agreed that the common ancestor of living arthropods had a anterior (front) part of the head divided into three sections (the protocerebrum, deutocerebrum and tritocerebrum), with the eyes innervated by the protocerebrum. The chelicerae of chelicerates and first antennae pair in mandibulates, which represent the first head appendage pair, innervated by the deutocerebrum, are suggested to be homologous, likely deriving from grasping first head appendages present in earlier members of Deuteropoda like megacheirans. The second head appendage pair, innervated by the tritocerebrum, the pedipalps in chelicerates and the second pair of antennae in pancrustaceans are also homologous (it it suggested that in myriapods and hexapods that there is no limb attached to the tritocerebral segment).

== Areas of disagreement ==
Areas of disagreement can be grouped into three categories: the nature of the pre-antennal region in mandibulates; the nature of the labrum; and the relationship between the chelicerate and mandibulate anterior segments.

=== Nature of the preoral region ===
The degree to which the area in front of the mouth is segmented remains one of the major controversies in the arthropod head problem. As already mentioned, earlier workers often considered the entire pre-oral region to be "acronal" and thus nonsegmental. Modern workers universally accept that at least the deuterocerebrum is segmental. However, the nature of the region in front of this is much less certain. Some molecular development studies have given limited support to the idea of an "ocular" segment corresponding to the protocerebrum; but these data are not unequivocal. The idea of the protocerebrum actually comprising two components has also received support from both molecular and embryological data.

On this view, the protocerebrum comprises a typical 'segment', the prosocerebrum, marked by the expression of engrailed at its caudal margin and a pair of appendages (in most crown euarthropods, compound eyes, which are interpreted as modified trunk appendages), and a pre-segmental region, the archicerebrum, which bore a pair of appendages that are not serial homologues of the trunk appendages; these are represented by the onychophoran antennae and the 'great appendages' of certain stem euarthropods. The archicerebrum is in some ways equivalent to the 'acron', and may be equivalent (by means of a shared equivalent structure in the common ancestor of lophotrochozoans and ecdysozoans) with the annelid prototroch; it can be recognized by the expression of the genes optix and six3 during development, whereas the prosocerebrum is associated with orthodenticle and its homologs.

(Note that the terms archicerebrum and prosocerebrum are not always used consistently; see Composition of the protocerebrum.)

=== The labrum ===
The labrum is a flap-like structure that lies immediately in front of the mouth in almost all extant euarthropods, the general exception being provided by the probable chelicerate-relatives the pycnogonids. It has proved to be by far the most controversial of all arthropod head structures. It is innervated in crustaceans and insects from the tritocerebrum, i.e. the back of the brain. However, in development it often appears at the anterior of the head, and migrates backwards towards its adult position. Furthermore, it often appears as a bilobed structure, with a set of muscles, nerves and gene expression in many ways similar to that of a trunk appendage. This evidence has been used to suggest that the labrum is in fact a highly reduced appendage.

Its innervation from the rear of the brain has suggested to some workers that, if an appendage, it is the appendage of the tritocerebral segment; a point disputed by others who argue that the presence of a well-developed appendage in at least crustaceans in this segment (i.e., the second antenna, corresponding to the intercalary segment of insects) rules this out. If the labrum is an appendage then, it seems possible that its origin is indicated by its developmentally anterior position, i.e., that it is the appendage of a segment anterior to the first antenna. The most obvious choice for this is the segment whose ganglion is the protocerebrum, which in extant euarthropods bears no appendage (apart from the eyes). Strausfeld finds support for this hypothesis in the presence of a median nerve bundle connecting the labrum to the anterior of the protocerebrum, and the expression of the gene six3 in the labrum has been taken as evidence for its homology with onychophoran antennae (frontal appendages borne from the anterior of the protocerebrum).

If the labrum is really an anterior appendage that has migrated to the posterior, then it may be homologous to the "antennae" of onychophorans, which, as discussed below, seem to be innervated from a very anterior part of the brain, i.e. in front of the eyes. It has even been suggested (e.g., by Roonwal) that the labrum belongs to an even more obscure segment that lies in front of the ocular one. Nevertheless, many workers continue to be highly skeptical about the appendiculate nature of the labrum, preferring to see it as it appears, i.e., as an outgrowth of the body wall just in front of the mouth.

Particularly in some fossil groups, such as certain trilobites, the labrum is often covered with a sclerotised plate, the hypostome. Confusion can arise where the two structures are conflated or mistaken for one another.

=== Mandibulate/chelicerate head homologies ===
Given the disagreements about the structure of the insect head, on which most effort has been spent, it is no surprise that the potential homologies between it and other arthropods, notably the chelicerates, are also very controversial. From after the Second World War to the 1980s a commonly accepted model of arthropod evolution was that the extant euarthropods were polyphyletic, i.e. the main lineages had evolved independently from soft-bodied, annelid-like ancestors, following the work of Tiegs and especially Sidnie Manton. In this view, most of the head structures would also be convergent, and thus there was no point looking for specific homologies between major groups. However, the monophyletic theory of arthropod origins has since decisively gained the upper hand, which raises the problem of head homology once more.

The classical view was that the chelicerae were homologous to the second antennae of crustaceans (i.e., they are innervated from the tritocerebrum), a view based partly on the fact that the chelicerae were innervated from the same ganglion that innervates the labrum, which is the tritocerebrum in crustaceans and insects. Given that there are apparently no appendages in front of the chelicerae, the implication was that the deuterocerebrum had been lost in chelicerates (the protocerebrum innervates the eyes in both groups in this view). While this view still has its defenders (notably Colette and Jacques Bitsch), the alternative view that the chelicerae are innervated from the deuterocerebrum has gained ground, based on molecular development in mites and spiders, and neuroanatomy in Limulus. If this is the case, then chelicerates simply have no tritocerebrum, i.e. there is no third supraoesophageal ganglion of the brain; the segment corresponding to it would be the suboesophageal pedipalp one. Such a theory does not, however, immediately account for the same ganglionic innervation of the chelicerae and labrum, although one solution is simply to claim that the labrum itself is not homologous between mandibulates and chelicerates (the view, for example, of Dieter Waloszek and colleagues).

== The head of onychophorans ==
The brains of onychophorans (velvet worms) have been recently re-investigated and have been shown to possess two unusual features. First, although the mouth is ventral, as is the case in euarthropods, it is innervated from three different places; the sides, the posterior, and by a nerve that originates dorsally, and passes anteriorly down to curve back to the front of the mouth. This set of innervation makes sense if the mouth of onychophorans was originally terminal and has been bent downwards. Second, the antennae of the onychophorans appear to be innervated from in front of the eyes; which in euarthropod terms implies a protocerebral (or potentially even more anterior) innervation. This is supported by gene expression data, which show that the jaws too are derived from a protocerebral or deuterocerebral segment. As all euarthropod antennae are deuterocerebral or tritocerebral, this implies that the onychophoran antennae are not homologous to any euarthropod ones.

The tritocerebrum in arthropods is the first segment to express Hox genes; on this basis, it can be recognised as homologous to the third head segment in onychophora, which bears the slime glands (a pair of highly modified appendages).

== The head of pentastomids ==
The parasitic pentastomida (tongue worms) hatch with four head segments and three trunk segments, with two more body segments being added during postembryonic development. This number of segments then remains constant for the rest of their life. There are no antennae, and their mouth has no piercing, biting or sucking extremities. On each side of the mouth there is a pair of retractable hooks, and the mouth itself is sustained by a chitinous buccal ring. They feed through a pumping mechanism located in the pharynx, consisting of two rigid chitinous plates that is connected to several associated muscles.

== The brain of tardigrades ==
Tardigrades bear a circumoral nerve ring which has been homologised with the nerve ring of the ancestral ecdysozoan, and the arthropod (=Euarthropoda + Onychophora) protocerebrum, suggesting that the protocerebrum is homologous with the ancestral ecdysozoan brain.

On this view, the stylet apparatus is homologous with the euarthropod labrum / onychophoran antennae, and the first pairs of walking legs correspond to the deutocerebral and tritocerebral appendages.

== Fossil evidence ==
The Cambrian fossil record, above all the various lagerstätten such as the Burgess Shale, Sirius Passet, Chengjiang and Orsten faunas, has yielded a record of well-preserved arthropods, including the well-known trilobites.

Many Cambrian arthropods, including the trilobites themselves, possess a single pair of slender antennae, which have been equated with either the first or second antennae of the crustaceans; and either the chelicerae or the missing appendages of the supposedly reduced deuterocerebrum in chelicerates. However, another group of arthropods, the so-called "great appendage" arthropods, including Yohoia, Leanchoilia and Alalcomenaeus, do not possess simple antennae, but rather have a robust, branched structure, which was called the "great appendage" by Harry B. Whittington in his restudy of these taxa. Yet another group of arthropods may possess two differentiated head appendages, of which the most important and controversial is the Chengjiang form Fuxianhuia. Fuxianhuia was claimed to possess a pair of short antennae anterior, followed by a robust pair of "sub-chelate" appendages. However, this assessment has been both disputed by Waloszek and colleagues, who consider that the sub-chelate appendages are in fact gut diverticulae; and supported by Graham Budd. Thus, its nature remains controversial at present. Other taxa have also been claimed to have a somewhat similar anterior appendage arrangement (e.g. Fortiforceps) but, with the exception of the well-preserved Branchiocaris from the Burgess Shale, most of them are highly equivocal.

In almost all Cambrian arthropods, the post-oral limbs show very little differentiation compared to the trunk limbs; the heads posterior to the mouth shows a considerable degree of variability, however, in the number of segments incorporated into the head.

Trilobites, in particular, possess a ventral sclerotised plate in the head called the hypostome. Whether this is homologous to the labrum or not is debated; although Waloszek and others have argued that as the phosphatocopines (upper stem-group crustaceans) seem to possess both, it cannot be.

=== Theories of Cambrian arthropod head segmentation ===
There are at least four main theories to account for anterior head appendages in Cambrian arthropods:

==== Scholtz and Edgecombe ====
Gerhard Scholtz and Greg Edgecombe accept that the antennae of onychophorans are protocerebral, and call them "primary" antennae to distinguish them from the "secondary" antennae of groups such as the insects and crustaceans. They also accept that taxa such as Fuxianhuia possess both antennae and "great appendages". Because in Fuxianhuia the antennae lie anterior to the great appendages, they suggest that these antennae are the inherited primitive "primary" antennae; and that the great appendages are thus equivalent to the first antennae of crustaceans. Because the secondary antennae are not present in stem group arthropods such as Fuxianhuia, nor in the extant chelicerates, they propose that arthropods, such as the trilobites, that possess secondary antennae, belong in a monophyletic group that also includes the mandibulates, called the Antennata. The trilobites are thus, in their view, not stem-group chelicerates, a commonly held view, but rather, stem-group mandibulates. The status of the labrum is not resolved by this theory, but they argue that it the evidence for it being appendiculate is not compelling; thus it does not have to correspond to a well-developed appendage of any Cambrian arthropod.

The 2014 description of Lyrarapax poses a challenge for this theorem: assuming that its nervous tissue is correctly identified as such, the great appendages of this radiodont are innervated into the front of the protocerebrum, undermining the suggestion that the great appendages are deuterocerebral.

==== Budd ====
Graham Budd's theory agrees with that of Scholtz and Edgecombe in accepting the protocerebral nature of the onychophoran antennae, and the two preoral appendages of Fuxianhuia. However, he traces the origin of the "great appendages" in the differentiated frontal appendages of Cambrian lobopods such as Aysheaia and Kerygmachela, neither of which possess convincing antennae. Thus, in Budd's view, the order of the two anterior appendages of taxa such as Fuxianhuia are reversed: the antennae are the first antennae (deutocerebral) of the mandibulates; and the great appendages correspond to the primary antennae of the onychophorans and Cambrian lobopods. Following previous work by Dewel and colleagues, Budd accounts for their reversal by arguing that the mouth in basal lobopods was terminal, and that as it rotated backwards and downwards, it brought the anterior appendage backwards with it. Given this transformation, it is likely, under this theory, that the remnant of the great appendage/primary antenna is the labrum of extant arthropods. Because in this view Fuxianhuia possesses both a hypostome and a great appendage, the hypostome cannot be straightforwardly homologous with the labrum.

==== Pycnogonids and the great appendage theory ====
Maxmen and others published a morphologically-based paper that claimed the enigmatic chelifores of extant pycnogonids (sea spiders) are innervated from the protocerebrum, and not from the trito- or deutocerebrum as previously claimed. This would suggest that pycnogonids had uniquely retained a "great appendage" homologue as an appendage, unlike all other euarthropods in which it had been transformed into the labrum (pycnogonids lack a labrum). However, expression data of Hox genes that were published shortly afterwards suggested that the chelifores were deuterocerebral and thus most likely to be homologous to the chelicerae. The pycnogonids are thus neutral with regard to the great appendage theory.

==== Waloszek ====
Dieter Waloszek and colleagues have offered a rather different account of Cambrian arthropod head structure. They do not necessarily accept the primary antenna theory of the onychophoran antennae; and they reject the idea that Fuxianhuia or any of its close relatives possessed a great appendage. Rather, they place the "great appendage" arthropods in the stem-group of the chelicerates, arguing that the great appendage is homologous to the chelicerae of chelicerates, and the first antennae of crustaceans.

==== Cotton and Braddy ====
Trevor Cotton and Simon Braddy, in a comprehensive cladistic analysis of Cambrian arthropods, also proposed that the great appendage arthropods were stem-group chelicerates; accepting that Fuxianhuia and relatives possessed two preoral appendages, they defended the classical view that the great appendage and the chelicerae were tritocerebral in origin; i.e. that the antennae of Fuxianhuia were deuterocerebral.

== Assessment ==
The number and nature of the post-oral segments in the insect head have rarely been questioned. A much more difficult area, however, has been the nature of the preoral region. The obvious contradiction between a theory that no-preoral structures are segmental, and evidence, such as for the first antennae of crustaceans, that some such structures clearly are, led workers as long ago as Lankester to posit that there has been forward migration of segments in front of the mouth. Indeed, such a process can be seen in ontogeny of the tritocerebrum, which can be seen to migrate forward as the brain develops; furthermore, although in most insects and crustaceans its ganglia are part of the brain, its commissures still loop behind it, suggesting derivation from a more posterior position.

Nevertheless, even allowing for this possibility, the complexity of the anterior part of the brain, which even if the acron concept is incorrect may still have been inherited from very basal animals; untangling the new characters evolved by the earliest arthropods from those inherited from their ancestors therefore still stands centrally in the arthropod head problem.
