= Zhangshania =

Zhangshania Temporal range: Late Botomian

Scientific classification
- Kingdom: Animalia
- Phylum: Arthropoda
- Clade: †Artiopoda
- Class: †Trilobita
- Order: †Redlichiida
- Family: †Gigantopygidae
- Genus: †Zhangshania; Li & Zhang, 1990

Zhangshania is an extinct genus of redlichiid trilobite. It lived during the later part of the Botomian stage, which lasted from approximately 524 to 518.5 million years ago. This faunal stage was part of the Cambrian Period.
