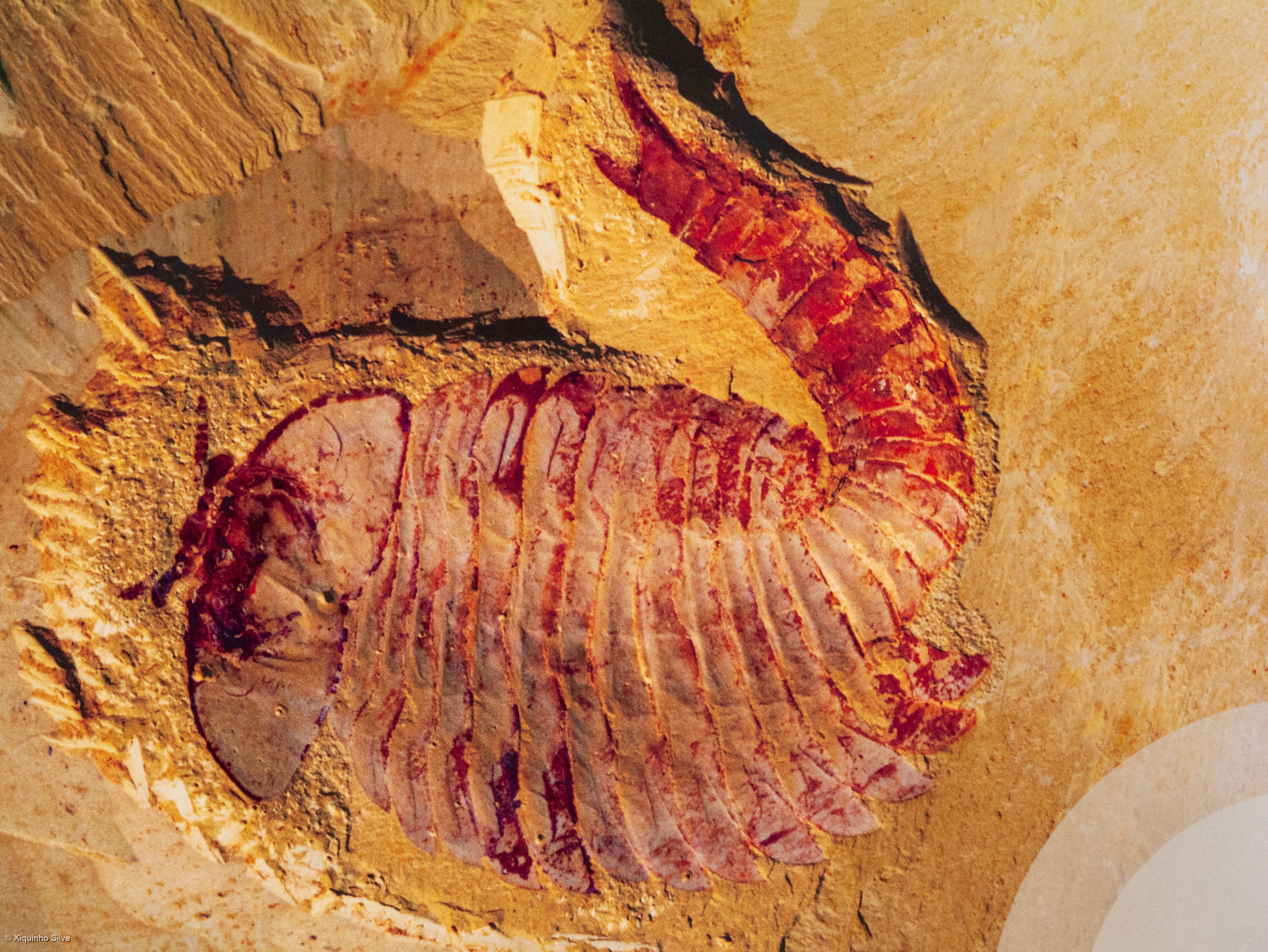
- Fuxianhuia protensa
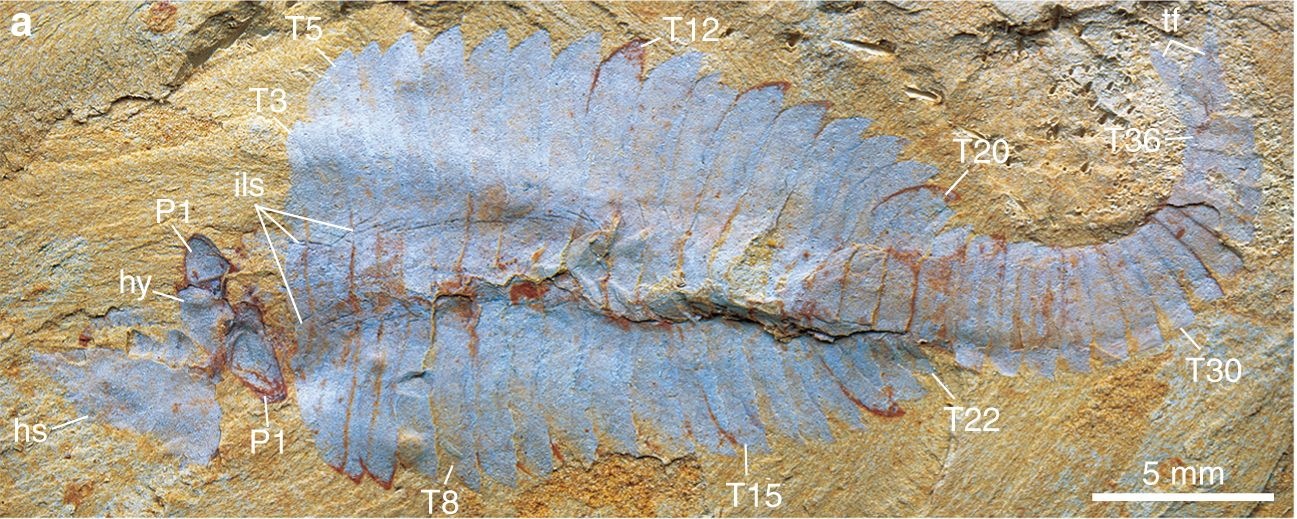
- Fuxianhuia xiaoshibaensis

Scientific classification
- Kingdom: Animalia
- Phylum: Arthropoda
- Order: †Fuxianhuiida
- Family: †Fuxianhuiidae
- Genus: †Fuxianhuia; Hou, 1987

Type species
- Fuxianhuia protensa Hou, 1987

Other species
- Fuxianhuia xiaoshibaensis Yang et al., 2013

Synonyms
- Pisinnocaris subconigera? Hou & Bergström, 1998

= Fuxianhuia =

Fuxianhuia Temporal range: Lower Cambrian 516.0–513.0 Ma

Extinct genus of arthropods

Fuxianhuia is a genus of Lower Cambrian fossil arthropod known from the Chengjiang fauna in China. Its purportedly primitive features have led to it playing a pivotal role in discussions about the euarthropod stem group. Nevertheless, despite being known from many specimens, disputes about its morphology, in particular its head appendages, have made it one of the most controversial of the Chengjiang taxa, and it has been discussed extensively in the context of the arthropod head problem.

The genus is named after Fuxian Lake (Fuxian Hu), where it was unearthed. Its specific name protensa refers to its extended trunk. Pisinnocaris has been suggested to be a possible junior synonym of Fuxianhuia, though other researchers argue that it is a valid, distinct taxon.

== Description ==
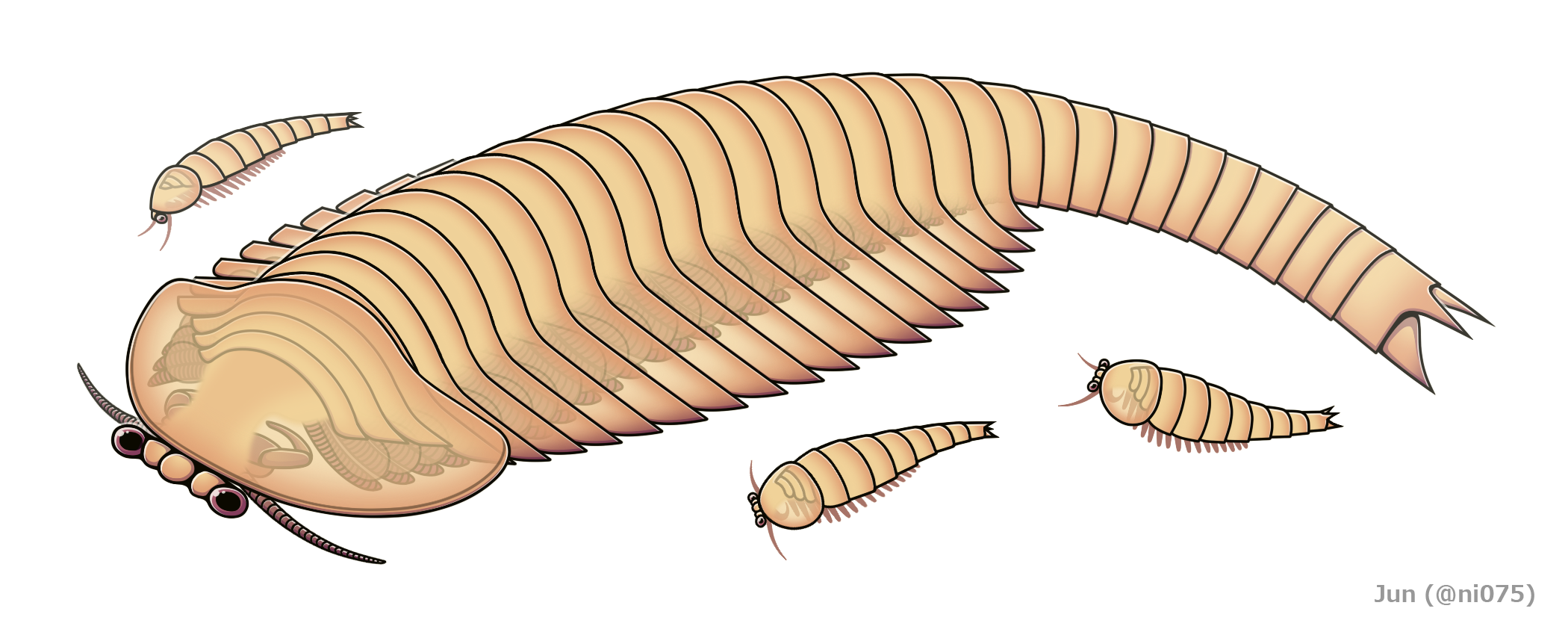
Restoration of Fuxianhuia protensa

Complete Fuxianhuia specimens are approximately 4 centimetres (1.6 inches) long. The anterior of Fuxianhuia is encased in an oval sclerite, from which two stalked eyes emerge. Inserting directly behind this sclerite, on the head shield proper, are two stout antennae. When the head of Fuxianhuia was originally described, two additional head appendages, the "sub-chelate" pair were also described. These are geniculate, backward-pointing appendages that lie in a highly stereotypical position (i.e., their position does not vary much from one specimen to another). Partly because of this, and partly because of their rather indistinct morphology, their status as appendages has been questioned. Indeed, on the grounds that these structures seem to lie between two cuticular layers, Waloszek and colleagues have suggested that they are not appendages at all, but rather gut diverticula; a reassignment that has however not been universally accepted. Ventrally, a large plate has been interpreted as a hypostome.

The head shield overlaps a tapering series of 12 to 17 trunk tergites, which lead into a set of limb-bearing segments comprising the thorax. The limbs are simple in form, consisting of a smooth oval exopod and a stout, annulated endopod. There is no one-to-one correspondence between the thoracic tergites and the limbs, but, rather, there appear to be two or three limbs per tergite.

Behind the thorax is a narrower abdominal region, consisting of 14 tergites, that bears no appendages. The abdomen is terminated by a telson-like spine.

=== Brain anatomy ===
In 2012, a Fuxianhuia fossil was described with exceptional preservation of brain and optic lobes. The shape and complexity corresponds roughly to that of a modern malacostracan brain. In general, the Fuxianhuia brain shows the same tripartite morphology of Malacostraca, Chilopoda and Insecta, indicating that such an organization could be precedent to the divergence between these clades.

=== Cardiovascular anatomy ===
In 2014 a fossil was described that preserved in exquisite, unequaled detail the tubular heart and blood vessels, which represent the oldest cardiovascular system yet identified. "The rich vascularization in the head... suggests that the brain of this species required a good supply of oxygen for its performance," said University of Arizona neuroscientist Nicholas Strausfeld, one of the researchers.

== Paleobiology and ecology ==
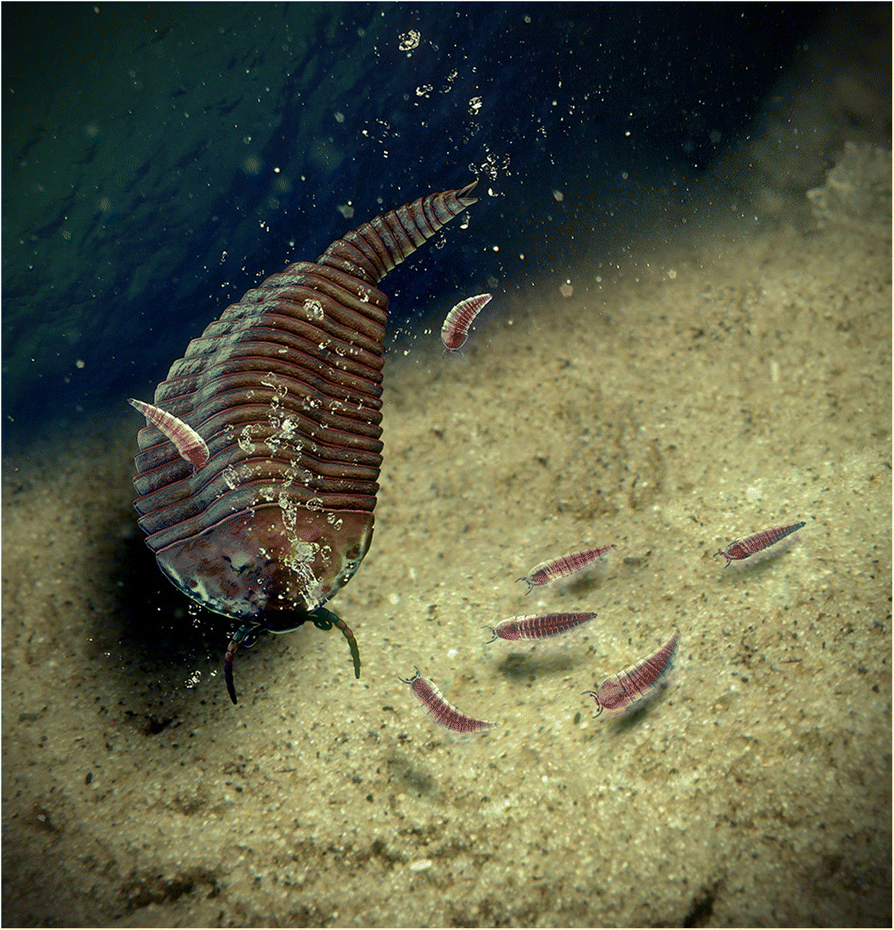
Life illustration of Fuxianhuia engaging in parental care of offspring, as inferred from the fossil record

A specimen of Fuxianhuia was found with the remains of the trilobite Pagetia in its gut tract, indicating that it took relatively hard prey at least on occasion. As individuals of Fuxianhuiia grew, new segments were added to the posterior of the body. The findings of somewhat advanced juvenile individuals of Fuxianhuia associated with adults suggests that in this taxon the juveniles were subject to extended post-hatching parental care.

== Classification ==
Fuxianhuia was first described from incomplete material, and its true nature did not become apparent until the head and limbs were discovered. Its articulated head region, lack of tergite-segment correspondence and undifferentiated limbs have all been taken to indicate a very basal position in the arthropods, even though an early cladistic analysis suggested, rather, that it was a stem-group chelicerate. The presence of a distinct anterior sclerite bearing the eyes has been taken to suggest that a distinct acron once existed in front of the euarthropod head.

Fuxianhuia is now considered a member of the clade Fuxianhuiida, that includes other similar forms from the Cambrian of China. In a 2018 phylogeny, Fuxianhuia has been considered most closely related to Guangweicaris, together forming the family Fuxianhuiidae. The cladogram is given below.

- - Fuxianhuiida
    - - Shankouia
      - Liangwangshania
    - - Chengjiangocarididae
        - Alacaris
        - Chengjiangocaris
      - Fuxianhuiidae
        - Fuxianhuia
        - Guangweicaris

== See also ==
- List of Chengjiang Biota species by phylum
