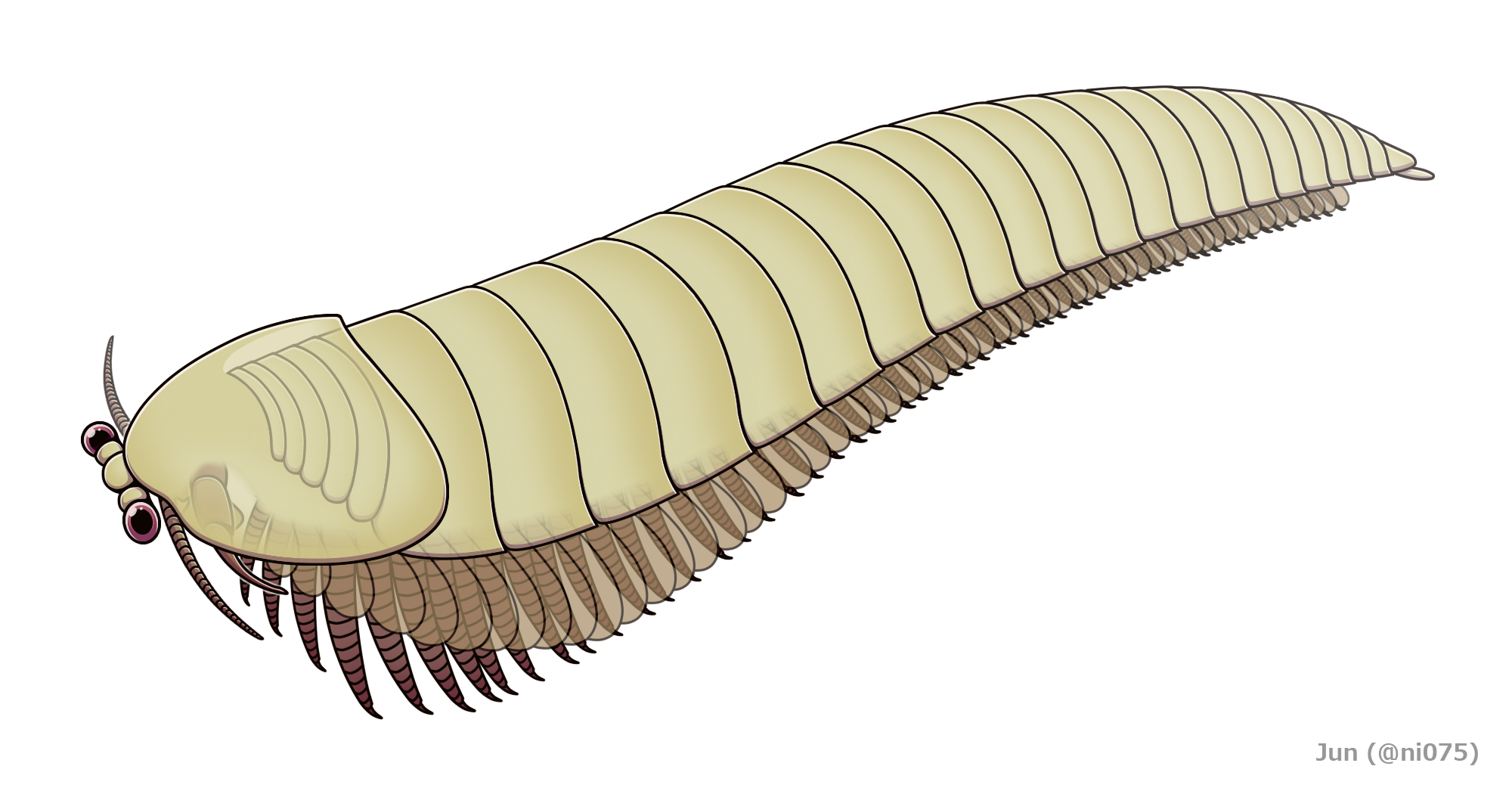
- Life restoration of Chengjiangocaris kunmingensis
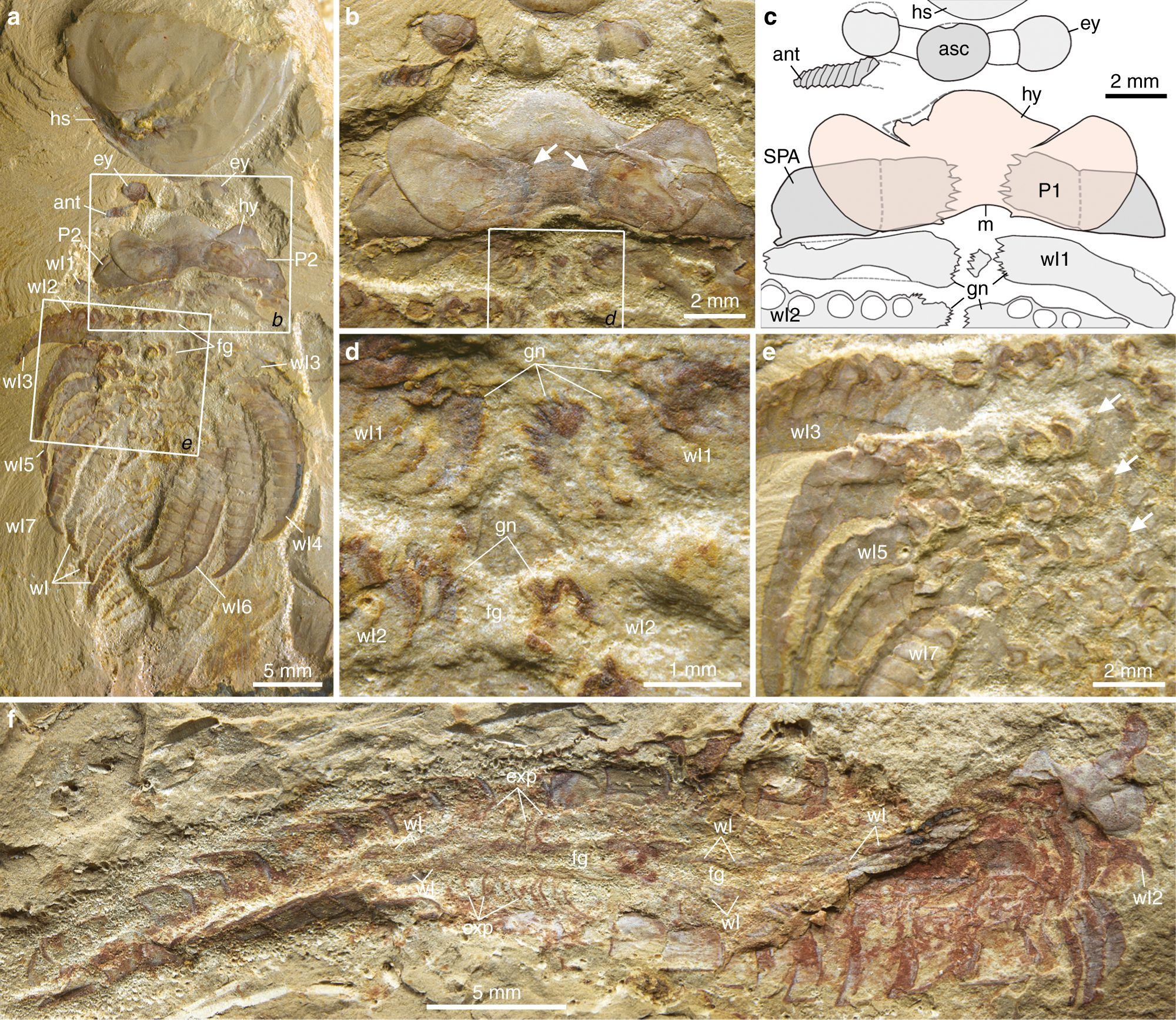
- Chengjiangocaris kunmingensis

Scientific classification
- Domain: Eukaryota
- Kingdom: Animalia
- Phylum: Arthropoda
- Order: †Fuxianhuiida
- Family: †Chengjiangocarididae
- Genus: †Chengjiangocaris; Hou and Bergström, 1991

Species
- Chengjiangocaris longiformis Hou and Bergström,1991; Chengjiangocaris kunmingensis Yang et al., 2013

= Chengjiangocaris =

Chengjiangocaris Temporal range: Early Cambrian–Mid Cambrian

Extinct genus of arthropods

Chengjiangocaris is an extinct genus of fuxianhuiid arthropod known from the Cambrian of South China. It contains two species, C. longiformis which was described in 1991. C. kunmingensis was described in 2013 by Javier Ortega-Hernández and colleagues. One specimen of C. kunmingensis shows detailed evidence of a nervous system. The nervous system of the chengjiangocaris is and has always been very complex to understand but a recent discovery of the ladder like ventral nerval cords and segmental ganglia of the related chengjiangocaris together with the brain provides the most comprehensive reconstruction of any lower Cambrian arthropod.

== Anatomy ==
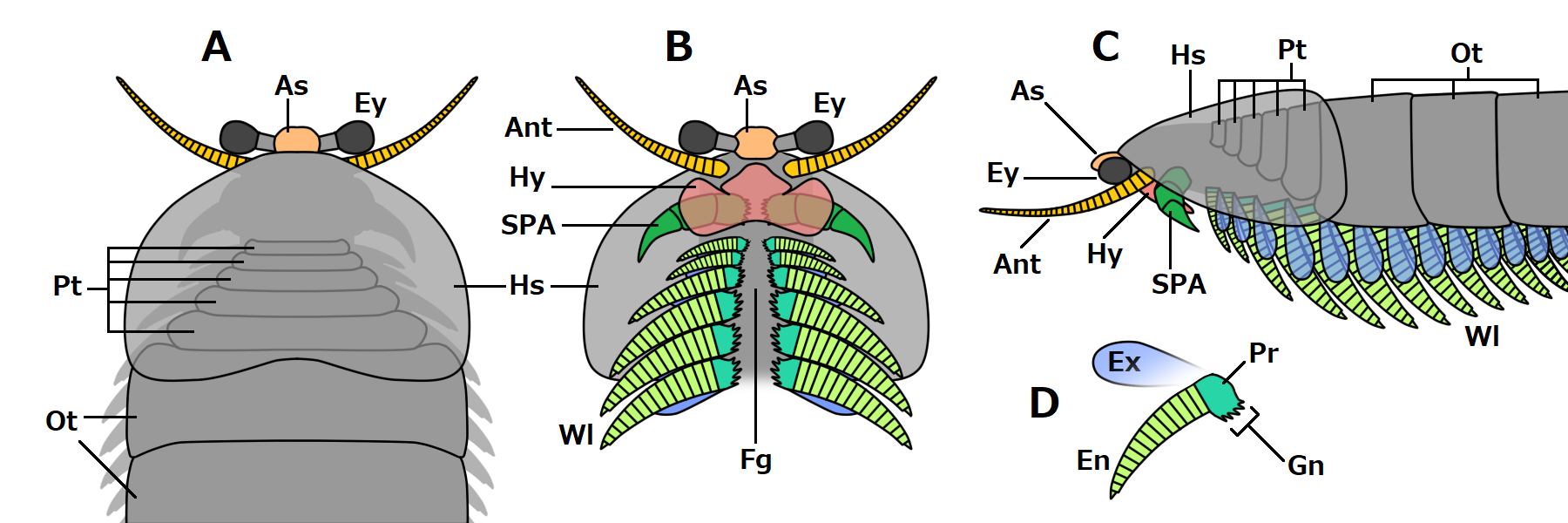
Anterior section of Chenjiangocaris

C. kunmingensis has 20 anterior trunk tergites and up to 16 narrow anterior tergites.

== Phylogeny ==
After

- - Fuxianhuiida
    - - Shankouia
      - Liangwangshania
    - - Chengjiangocarididae
        - Alacaris
        - Chengjiangocaris
      - Fuxianhuiidae
        - Fuxianhuia
        - - Guangweicaris
          - Xiaocaris
