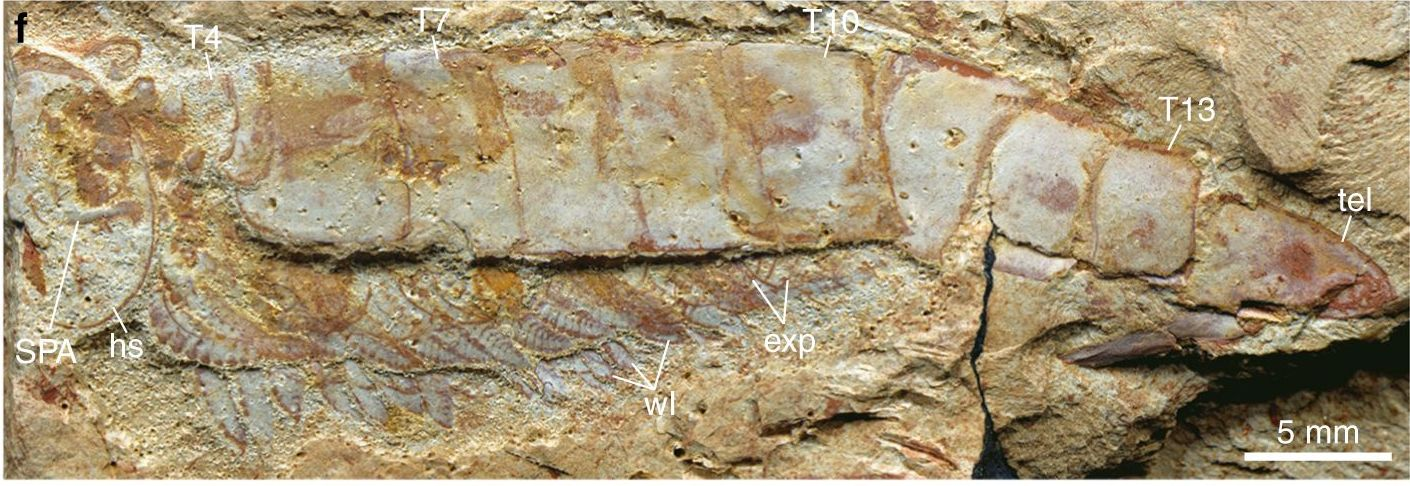
- YKLP 12269 largely complete specimen in lateral view
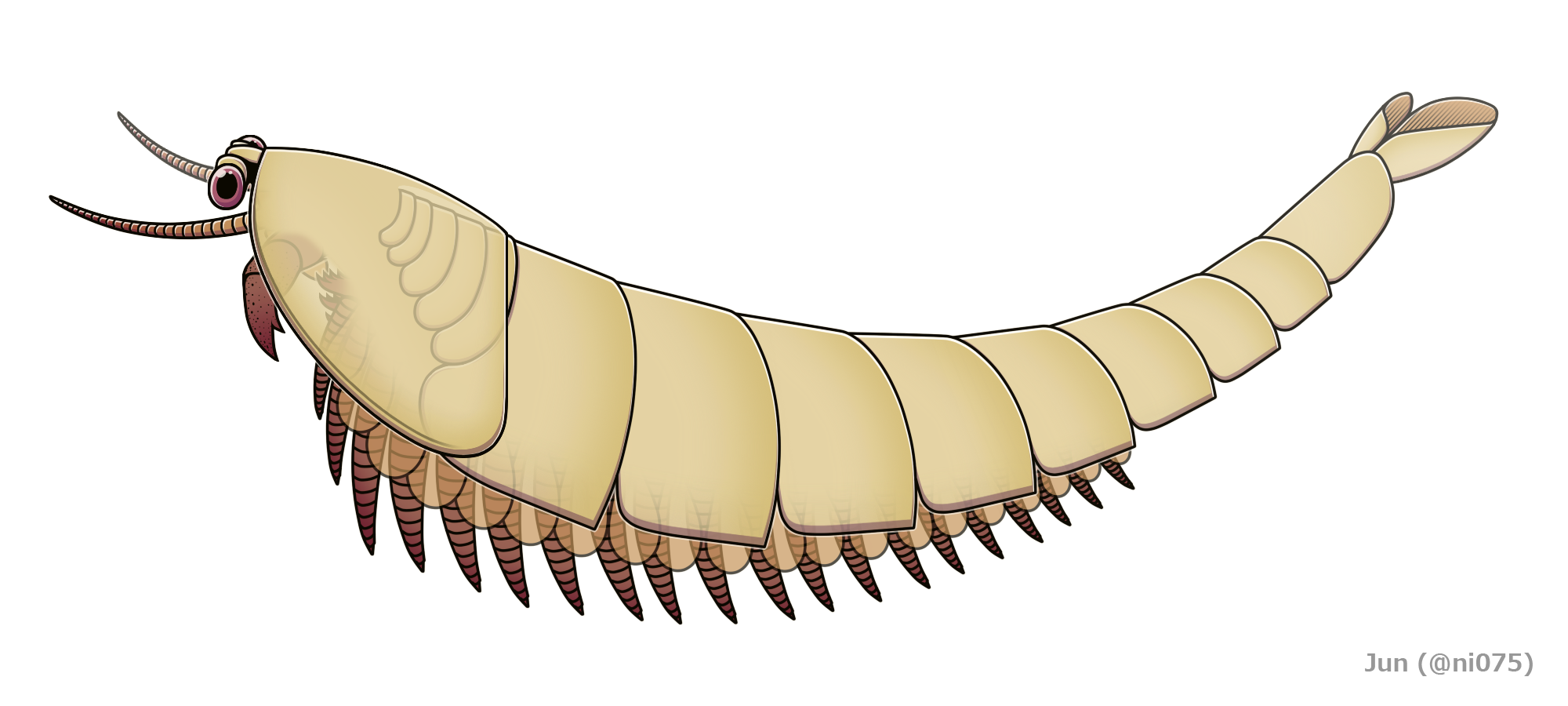
- Alacaris Reconstruction

Scientific classification
- Kingdom: Animalia
- Phylum: Arthropoda
- Order: †Fuxianhuiida
- Family: †Chengjiangocarididae
- Genus: †Alacaris; Yang et al, 2018

Type species
- Alacaris mirabilis Yang et al, 2018

= Alacaris =

Alacaris Temporal range: Cambrian Stage 3

Extinct genus of arthropods

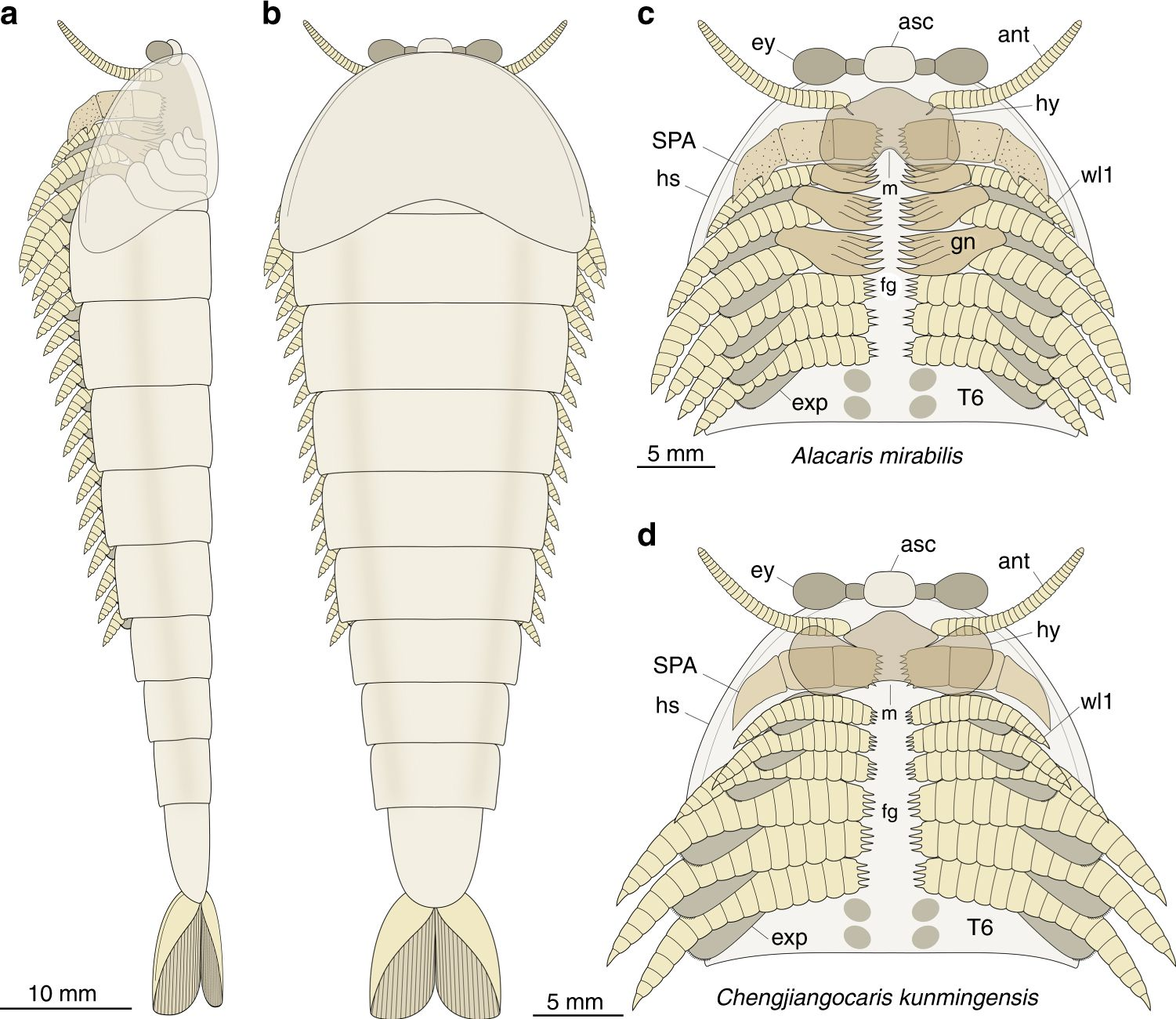
Reconstruction of Alacaris, with Chengjiangocaris lower right

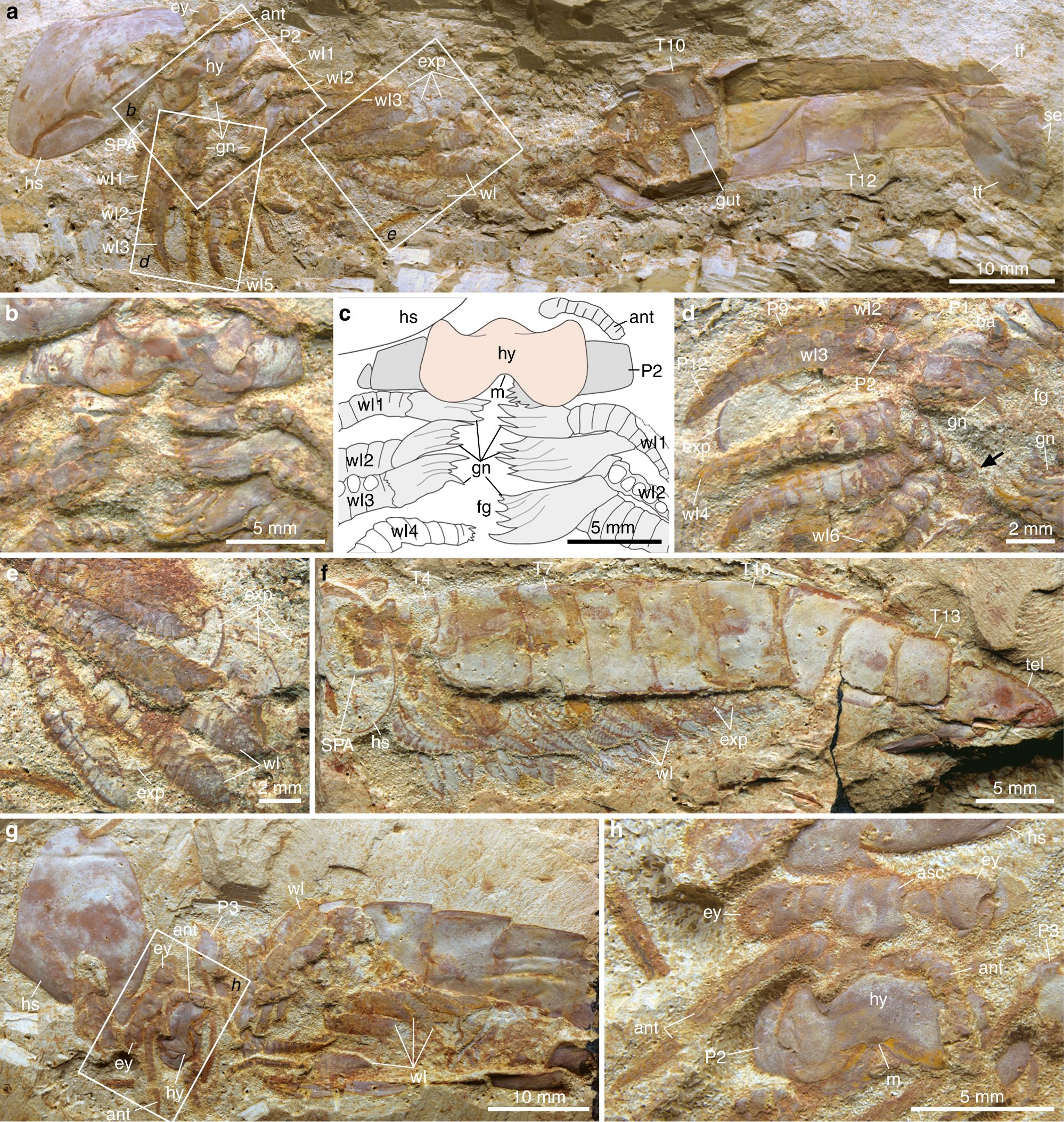
Various specimens of Alacaris

Alacaris is an extinct genus of fuxianhuiid arthropod known from the Cambrian period. It is only known from the type species Alacaris mirabilis (mistakenly named Alacaris multinoda in a figure in the describing paper) from the Cambrian Stage 3 aged Xiaoshiba Lagerstätte in Yunnan Province, China. It is morphologically similar to Chengjiangocaris, with which it forms a clade within Fuxianhuiida. Individuals reach a maximum of 12 centimetres in length, with a trunk consisting of 13 tergites. The basal region of the post-deutocerebral limbs were used in feeding, with the rhythmic movement of the legs guiding food towards the mouth along the food groove between the limbs, with gnathobases present near the mouth to macerate food.

== Phylogeny ==
- - Fuxianhuiida
    - - Shankouia
      - Liangwangshania
    - - Chengjiangocarididae
        - Alacaris
        - Chengjiangocaris
      - Fuxianhuiidae
        - Fuxianhuia
        - Guangweicaris
