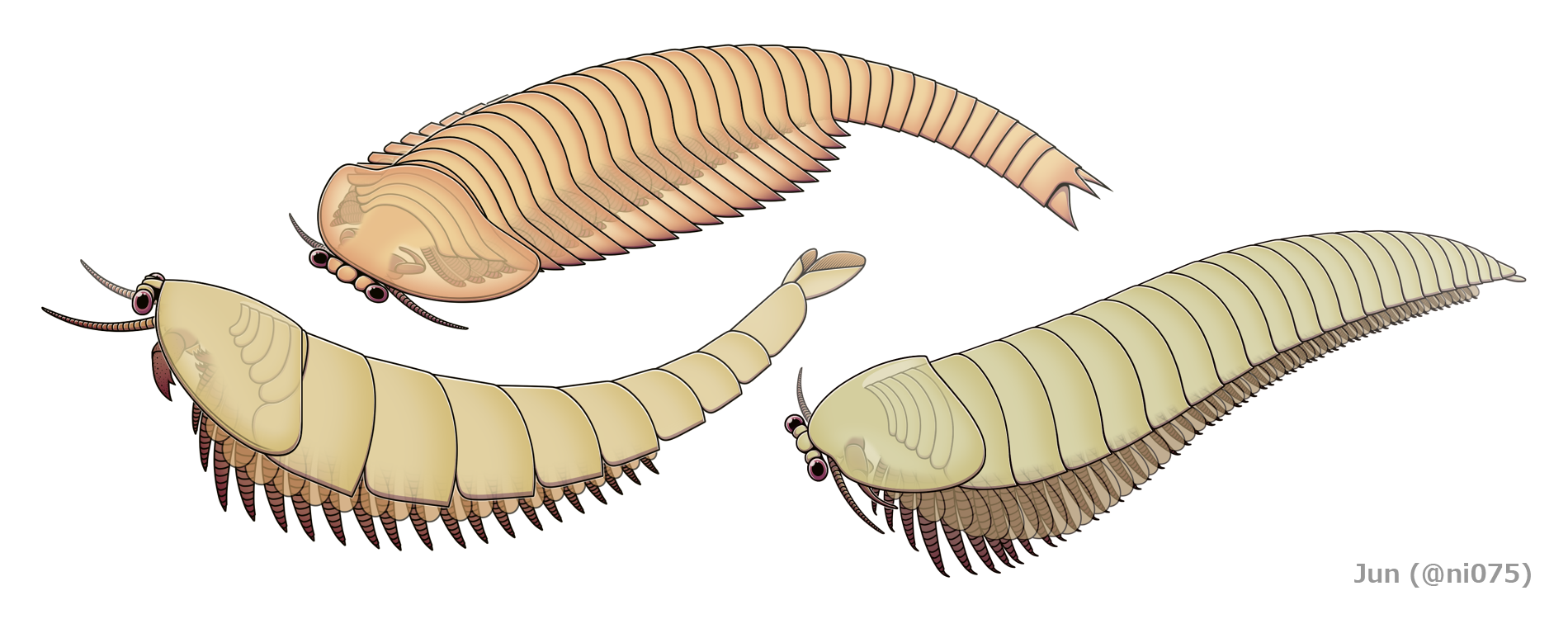
- Life restorations of Fuxianhuia (top), Alacaris, (left) and Chengjiangocaris (right)
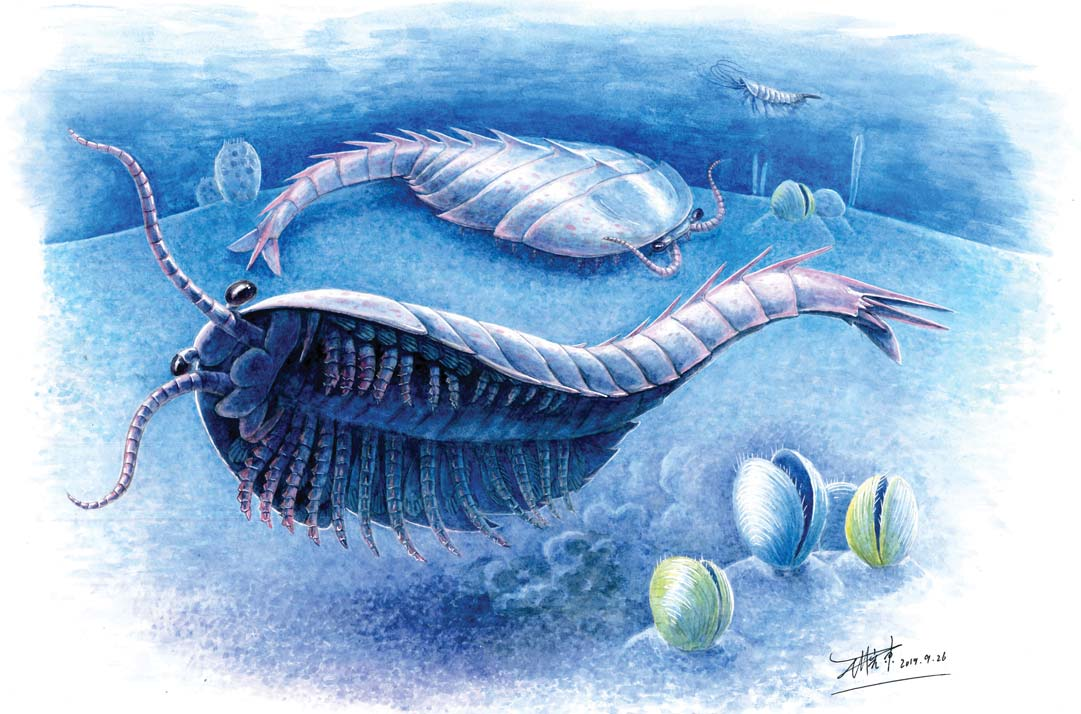
- Guangweicaris

Scientific classification
- Kingdom: Animalia
- Phylum: Arthropoda
- Clade: Deuteropoda
- Clade: Mandibulata
- Order: †Fuxianhuiida; Bousfield, 1995

Genera
- Liangwangshania; Lihuacaris?; Pisinnocaris; Shankouia; Fuxianhuiidae; Fuxianhuia; Guangweicaris; Xiaocaris; Chengjiangocarididae; Alacaris; Chengjiangocaris

= Fuxianhuiida =

Fuxianhuiida Temporal range: Cambrian Stage 3-Cambrian Stage 4 520–514 Ma

Extinct order of arthropods

Fuxianhuiida is an extinct clade of arthropods from the Cambrian of China. All currently known species are from Cambrian Series 2 aged deposits in Yunnan Province, including the Chengjiang biota. They are known from several specimens with exceptional soft-tissue preservation, including remnants of nerve and brain tissue.

== Description ==
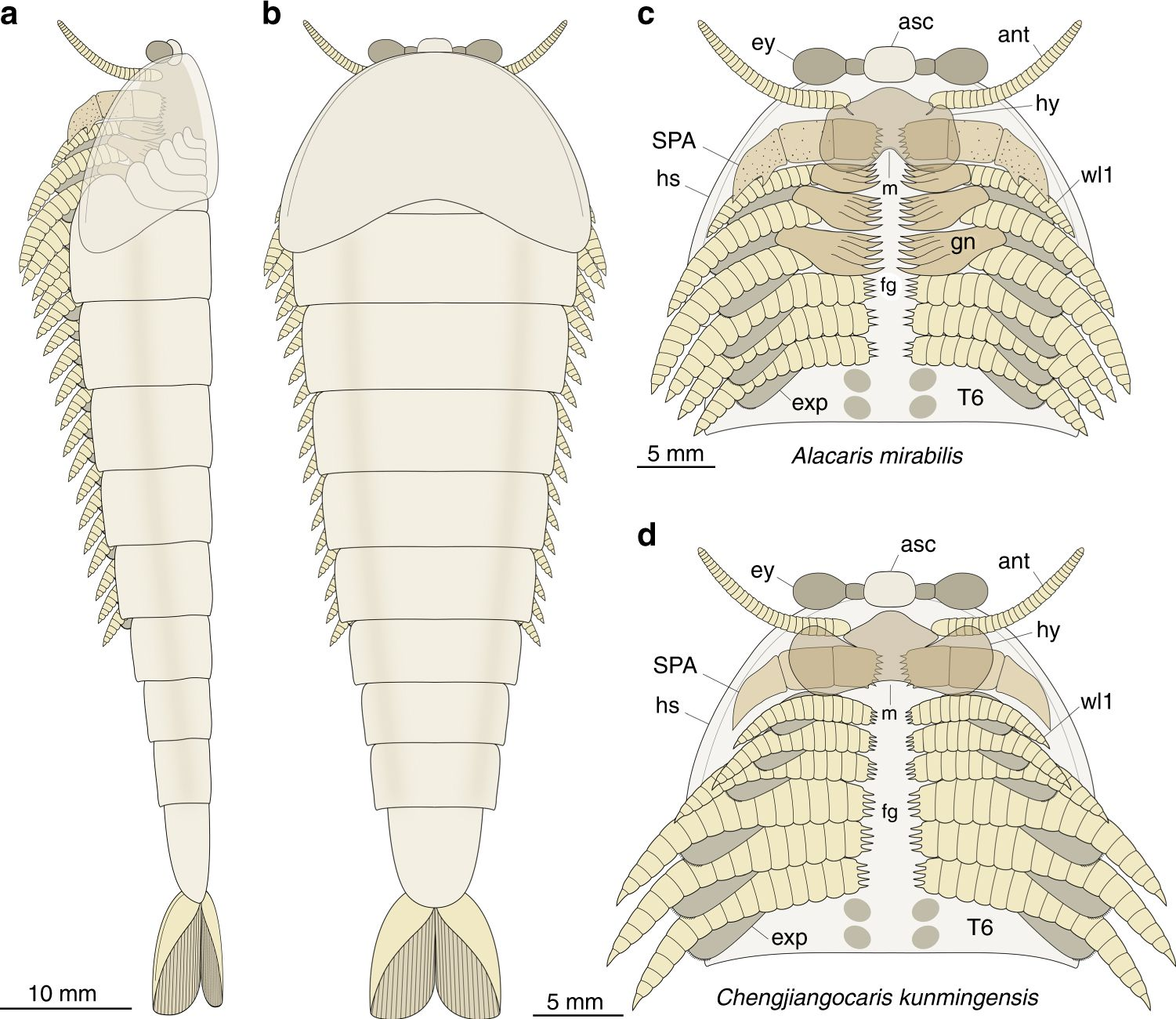
Diagrammatic reconstruction of Alacaris, with the underside of the head of Chengjiangocaris bottom right.

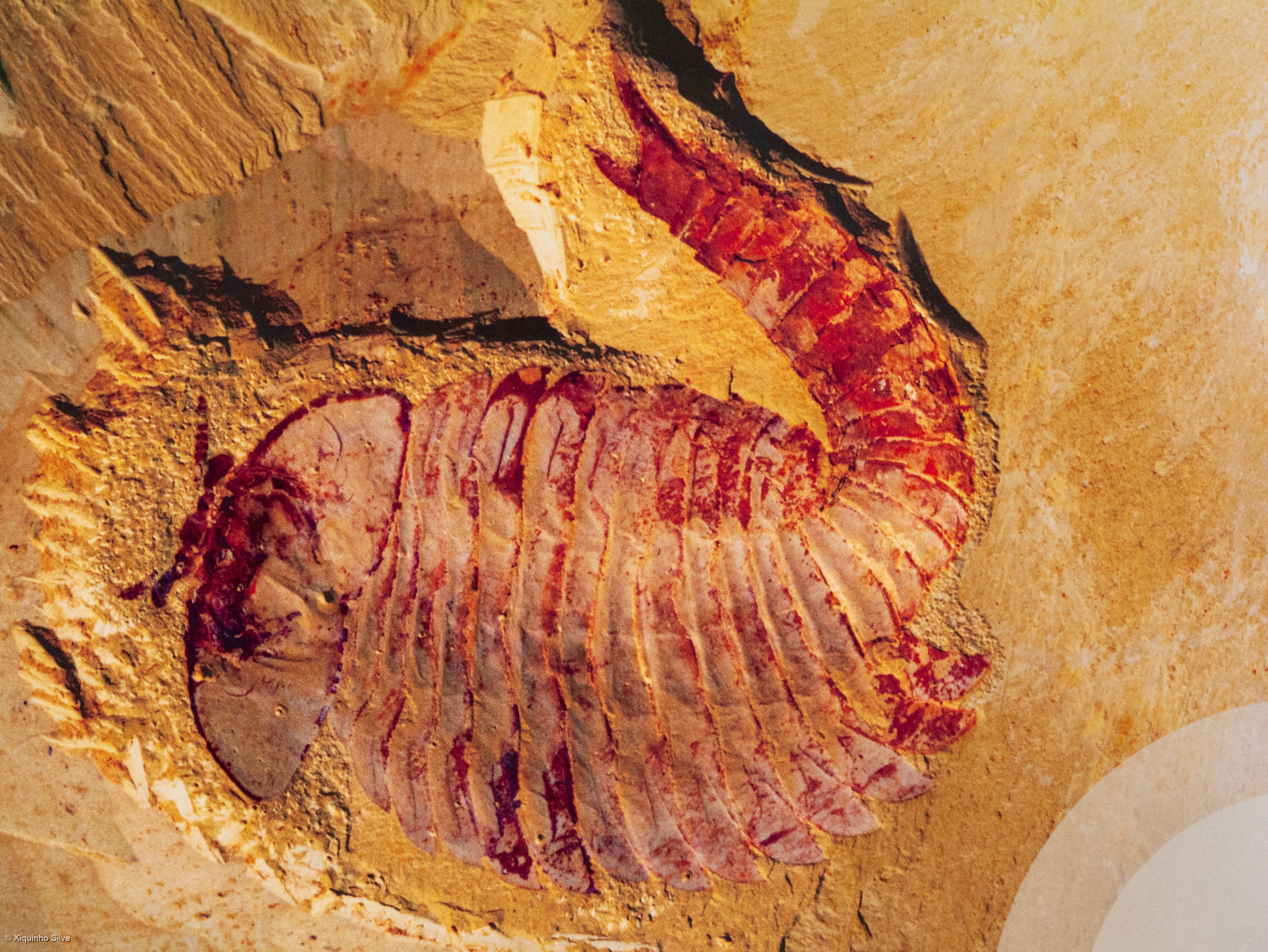
Fossil of Fuxianhuia

Fuxianhuiids reached a size of up to 15 centimetres (5.9 in). The fuxianhuiid exoskeleton was unmineralised, and the number of tergites (plates on the back associated with body segments) ranged from 15 to over 40. The cephalon (head section) was covered by a heart-shaped head shield, and contained stalked eyes connected by the anterior sclerite (a plate-like structure attached to the head), a pair of antennae, and a butterfly shaped hypostome (a plate-like structure), which covered the posterior-facing mouth. Fuxianhuiids possessed specialized appendages near the front of the body posterior to the antennae with serrated edges used for food processing, with chengjiangocardids having gnathobases (basal segments of the limbs close to where they connect with the body with sturdy, thick spines), used for processing food. To the underside of the body were attached numerous pairs of two-branched (biramous) limbs, with the lower branches (the endopods), which served as walking legs, having at least 10 segments (podomeres) and were generally short and similar in appearance to each other along the length of the body, with the frontmost legs of chenjiangocaridids ending in pronounced claws, while the upper branches (the exopods) of fuxianhuiids were flap-shaped. In most fuxianhuiids, the thorax tergites narrowed posteriorly, terminating in either a swimming paddle or paired flukes with a tail spine. In members of Fuxianhuiidae the thorax was divided into two sections, the front wide opisthothorax and the posterior narrow limbless tail-like abdomen.

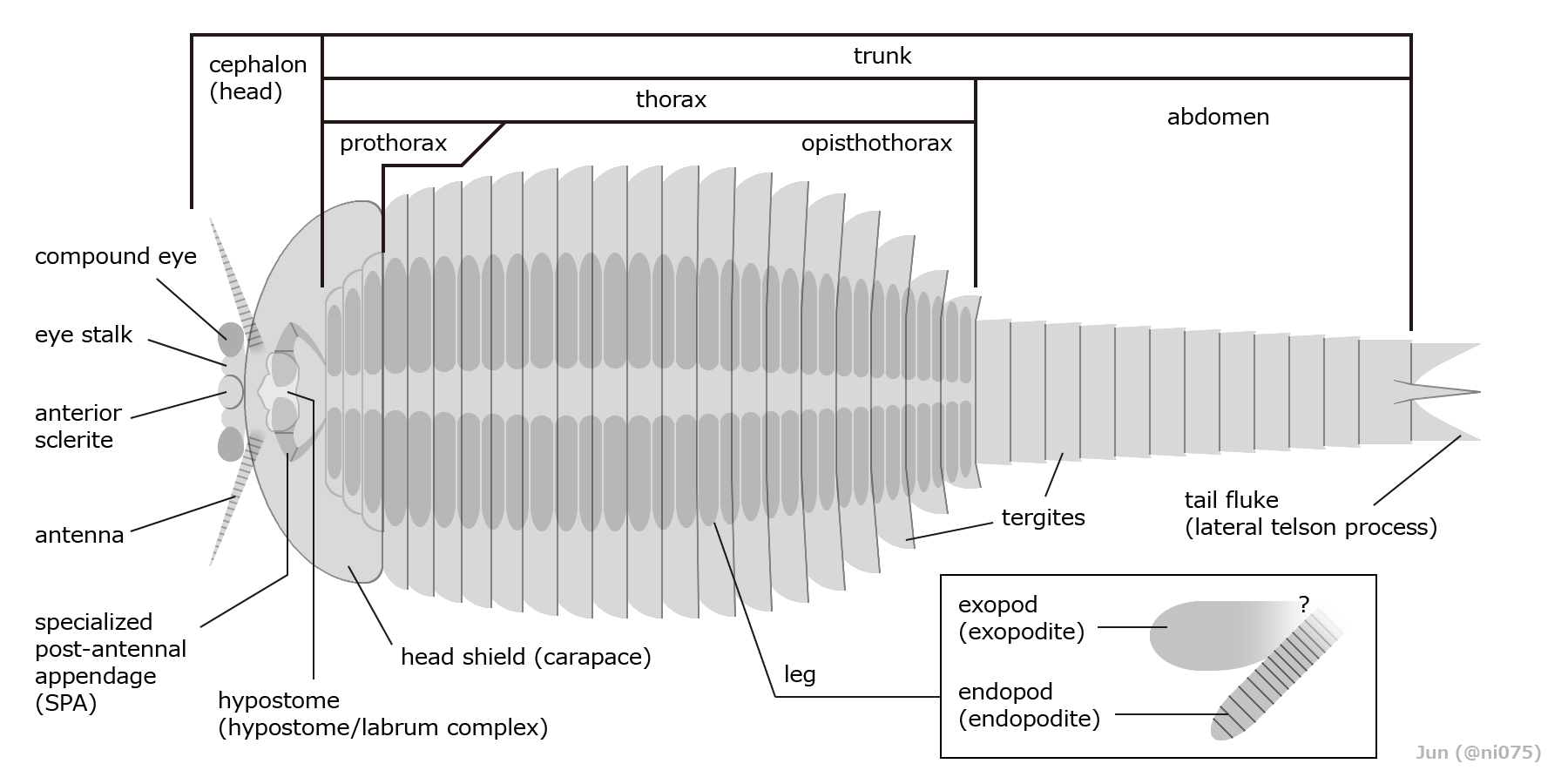
Labelled diagram of Fuxianhuia

A number of specimens are known with exceptional soft tissue preservation, including preserved guts and neural tissue including brain anatomy, which given their historically assumed basal phylogenetic position has made them a considerable focus of paleoneuroanatomy research. Fuxianhuiids had a straight gut tract that ran along the length of the body, with the sides of the gut tract of Fuxianhuia having pairs of lobe-shaped pockets (diverticulae) associated with each body segment. The ventral nerve cord, which in arthropods functions analogously to the vertebrate spinal cord, has reported to have been found preserved in a specimen of Chengjiangocaris, though the degree of certainty of this identification was later questioned. The brains of fuxianhuiids, based on an exceptionally preserved specimen of Fuxianhuia are suggested to have been composed of three parts (tri-partite) and to have been relatively complex.

== Paleobiology ==
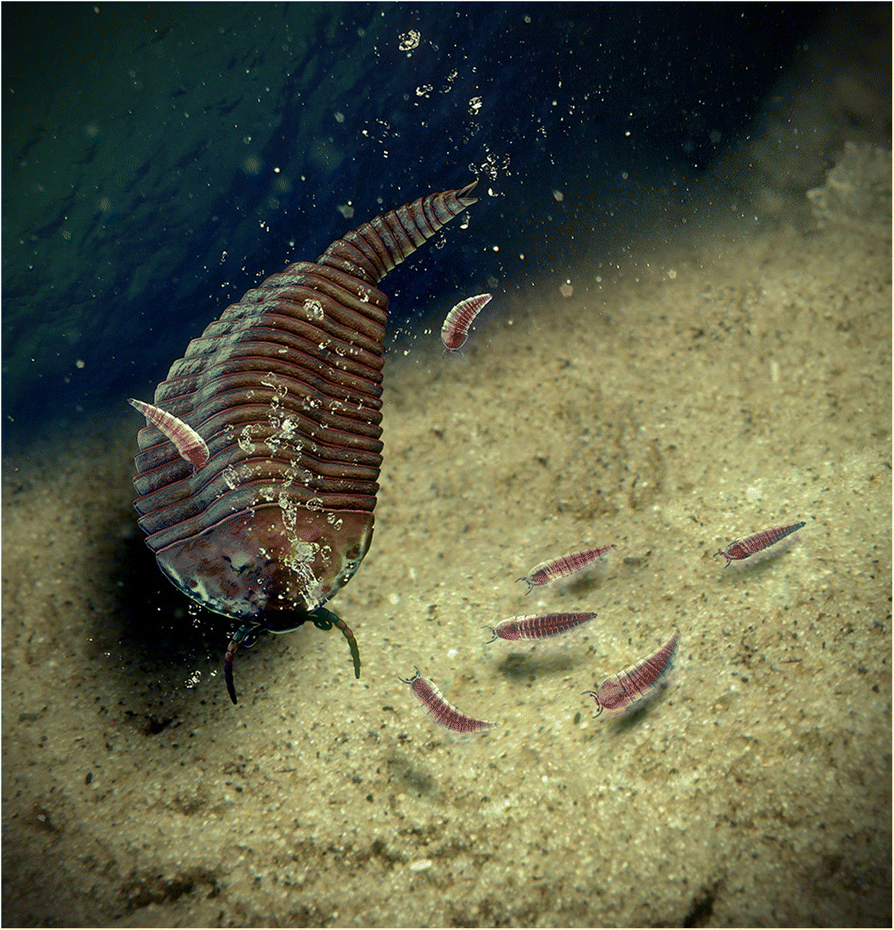
Life restoration of Fuxianhuia, engaging in parental care of offspring, as inferred from the fossil record

Fuxianhuiids are interpreted as benthic (seafloor dwelling) animals. Although initially interpreted as passive animals that ingested mud to feed on seafloor detritus, they are now considered to have probably been scavengers and possibly predators of slow moving prey such as worms. The presence of gnathobases in members of Chengjiangocardidae suggests that they were capable of durophagy (crushing hard prey). A specimen of Fuxianhuia was found with the remains of the trilobite Pagetia in its gut tract, indicating that it took relatively hard prey at least on occasion. The diverticulae in the gut tract of Fuxianhuia may indicate that it only intermittently fed. As fuxianhuiids grew, new segments were added to the posterior of the body. The findings of somewhat advanced juvenile individuals of Fuxianhuia associated with adults suggests that in this taxon the juveniles were subject to extended post-hatching parental care.

== Taxonomy ==
Internal taxonomy of Fuxianhuiida per Liu et al., 2020:

- - Fuxianhuiida
    - - Shankouia
      - Liangwangshania
    - - Chengjiangocarididae
        - Alacaris
        - Chengjiangocaris
      - Fuxianhuiidae
        - Fuxianhuia
        - - Guangweicaris
          - Xiaocaris

It has been suggested that Shankouia zhenghei is synonymous with Liangwangshania biloba, with sexual dimorphism accounting for variation between specimens.

=== Relationship with other arthropods ===
Although historically suggested to be members of the arthropod stem group, studies from the early 2020s onwards have supported their placement as closely related to living mandibulates, which include crustaceans, insects, and Myriapoda (the group which contains centipedes and millipedes, among others), due to the suggestion that their head feeding appendages are homologous to the mandibles of mandibulates. Cladogram of the position of Fuxianhuiida in relation to living and extinct arthropods after Liu et al, 2026:

- Panarthropoda
  - † "Lobopodia" (paraphyletic, ancestral to tardigrades, onychophorans and arthropods)
  - Total group Euarthropoda
    - †Megadictyon
    - - - †Kerygmachela
        - - †Pambdelurion
          - - †Opabiniidae
            - - † Radiodonta (e.g Anomalocaris)
              - Deuteropoda
                - †Erratus
                - - †Sunella
                  - - †Isoxyidae + "Great appendage bivalved forms"
                    - - - †Fengzhengia
                        - †Kylinxia
                      - - †Megacheira
                        - Pan-Chelicerata
                      - - †Kiisortoqia
                        - †Bushizheia
                        - Antennulata
                          - †Artiopoda (including Trilobita)
                          - Mandibulata
                            - †Fuxianhuiida
                            - - †Hymenocarina
                              - - Myriapoda
                                - Pancrustacea
