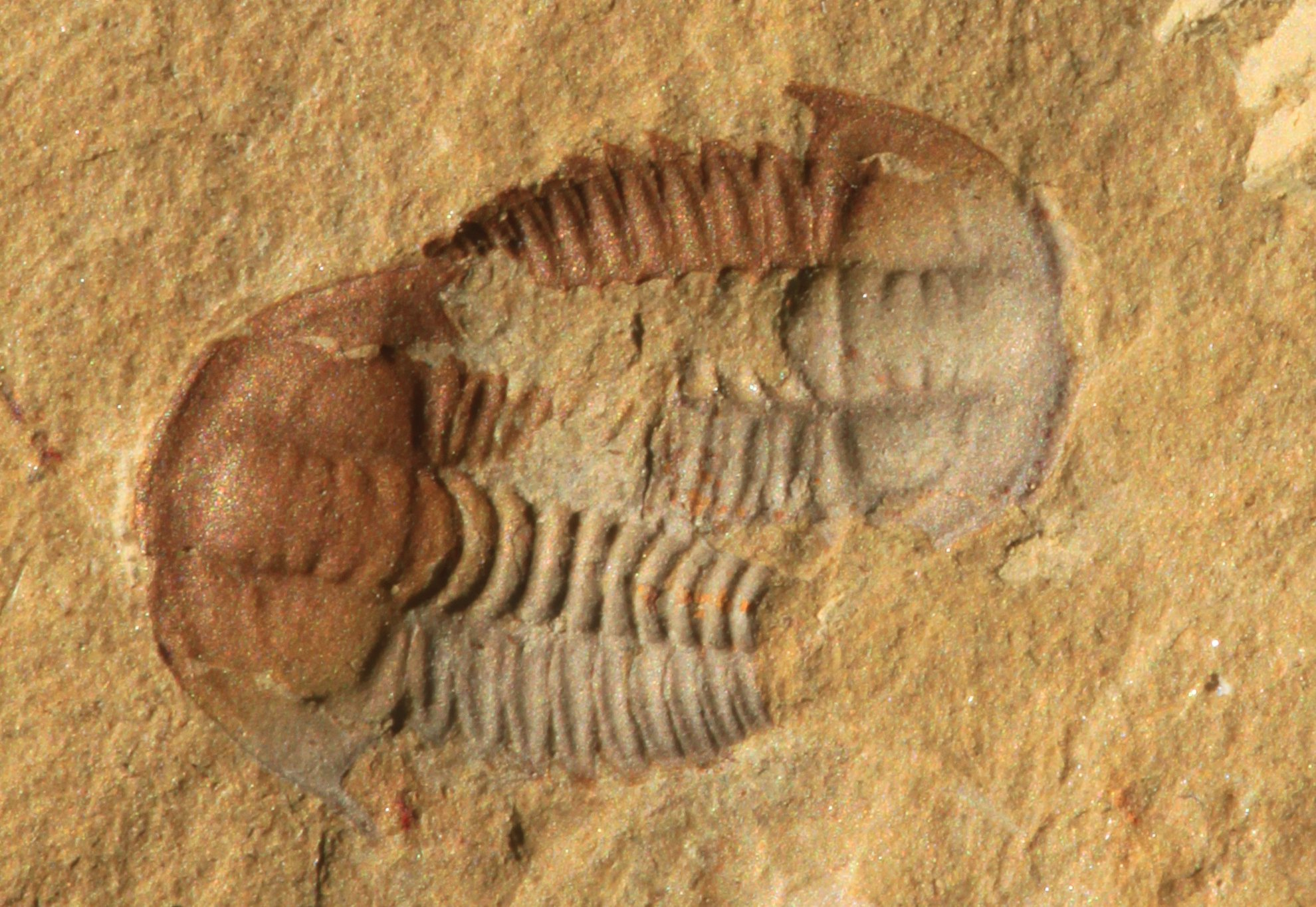
- A pair of Palaeolenus douvillei, 7mm

Scientific classification
- Domain: Eukaryota
- Kingdom: Animalia
- Phylum: Arthropoda
- Class: †Trilobita
- Order: †Ptychopariida
- Family: †Palaeolenidae
- Genus: †Palaeolenus; Mansuy, 1912

Species
- P. douvillei Mansuy, 1912; synonyms P. brevicus, P. deprati, Megapalaeolenus deprati, M. majiashanensis , M. guizhouensis, M. magnus, M. granulatus, M. expanus, M. luquanensis: P. lantenoisi Mansuy, 1912; synonyms P. tingi, P. minor, P. planilimbatus, P. liantuoensis, P. yangziensis, Megapalaeolenus obsoletus, M. yichangensis

Synonyms
- Megapalaeolenus; Schistocephalus; Palaeolentus

= Palaeolenus =

Palaeolenus Temporal range: Late Botomian

Genus of trilobites

Palaeolenus is an extinct genus of ptychopariid trilobites of the family Palaeolenidae. Species lived during the later part of the Botomian stage of the Cambrian Period, which lasted from approximately 524 to 518.5 million years ago. This faunal stage was part of the Cambrian Period
