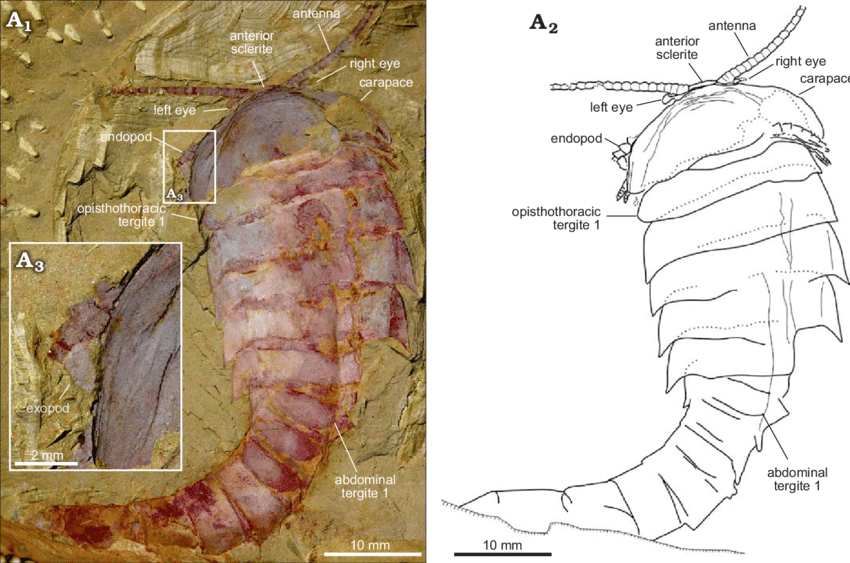
- YKLP 11141 largely complete specimen in dorsal view

Scientific classification
- Kingdom: Animalia
- Phylum: Arthropoda
- Order: †Fuxianhuiida
- Family: †Fuxianhuiidae
- Genus: †Guangweicaris; Luo, Fu, and Hu in Luo et al., 2007

Type species
- Guangweicaris spinatus Luo, Fu, and Hu in Luo et al., 2007

= Guangweicaris =

Guangweicaris Temporal range: Cambrian Stage 4

Extinct genus of arthropods

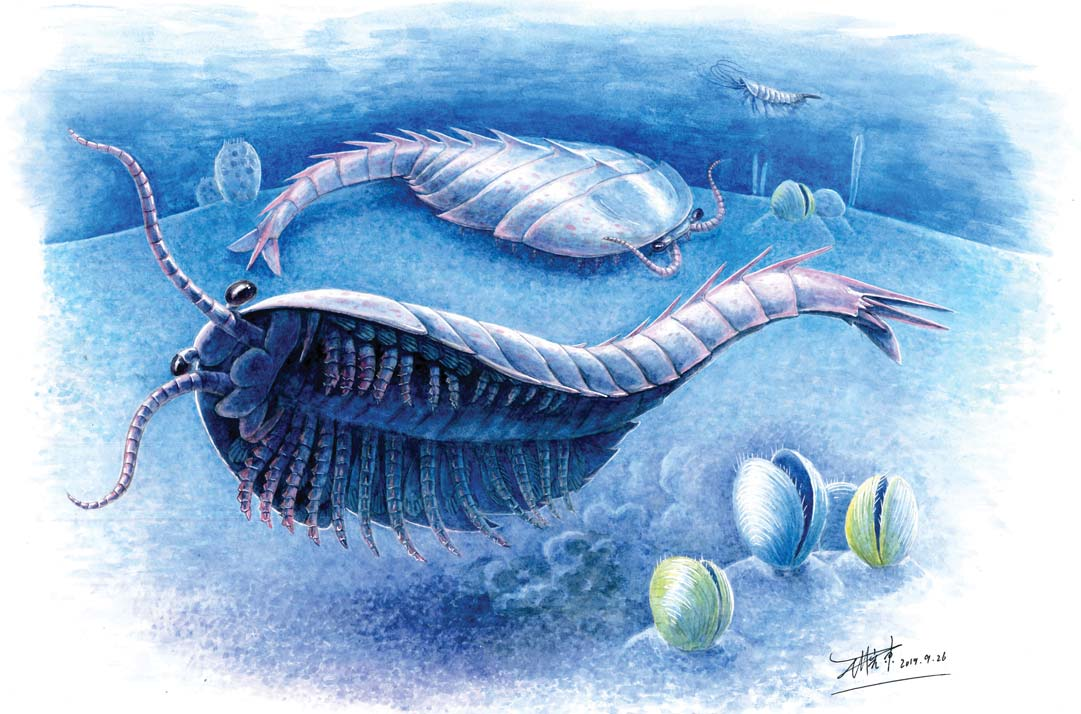
Restoration

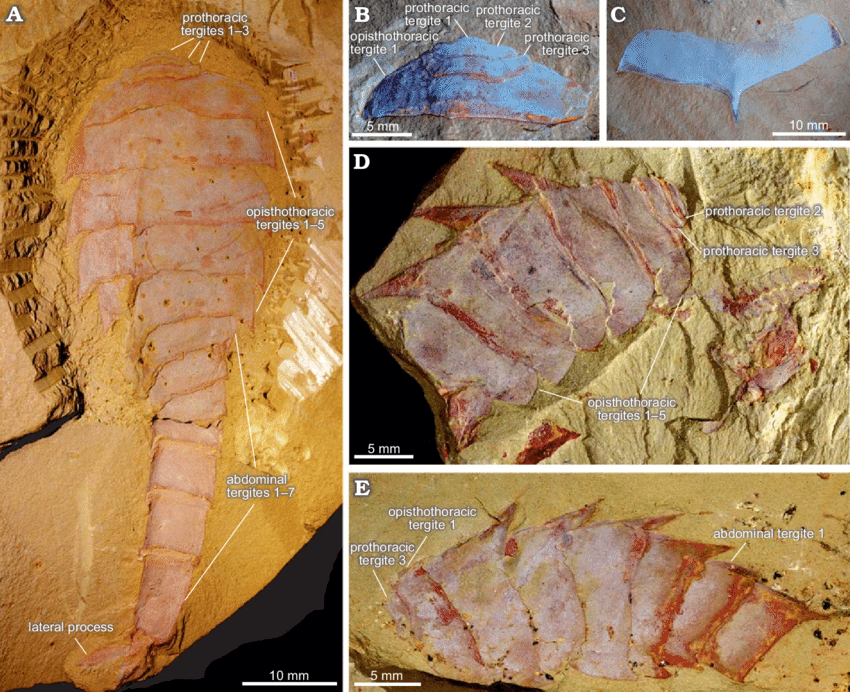
Additional specimens

Guangweicaris is an extinct genus of fuxianhuiid arthropod known from the Cambrian period. It is only known from the type species Guangweicaris spinatus, which is known from the Cambrian Stage 4 Guanshan Biota near Kunming. It is currently the latest known fuxianhuiid. It was first described in 2007, and was given a comprehensive re-description in 2020. It is currently known from over 150 specimens. Within the fuxianhuiids it is sister to Fuxianhuia, together forming the clade Fuxianhuiidae. In comparison to Fuxianhuia it has a wide, oval shaped opisthothorax and a proportionally longer, narrow tail-like abdomen, with 3 prothoracic tergites, 5 opisthothoracic tergites and 7 abdominal tergites, it also possesses a row of spines running down the central axis of the body from the second opisthothoracic tergite.

== Phylogeny ==
From

- - Fuxianhuiida
    - - Shankouia
      - Liangwangshania
    - - Chengjiangocarididae
        - Alacaris
        - Chengjiangocaris
      - Fuxianhuiidae
        - Fuxianhuia
        - Guangweicaris
