= Liangwangshania =

Liangwangshania Temporal range: Cambrian Stage 3

Scientific classification
- Kingdom: Animalia
- Phylum: Arthropoda
- Order: †Fuxianhuiida
- Family: †Fuxianhuiidae
- Genus: †Liangwangshania; Chen, 2005
- Species: †L. biloba

Binomial name
- †Liangwangshania biloba Chen, 2005

Genus of extinct arthropod

Liangwangshania biloba, described in 2005, is an extinct genus of fuxianhuiid arthropod known from the Cambrian Maotianshan Shales of China. It is the only species within the genus Liangwangshania.

== Description ==
Measured specimens range in length between 45 millimetres (1.8 inches) to 70 mm (2.8 in), when measured from anterior to tip, excluding sclerite and eye stalks. The carapace is wider than it is long, ranging from 1.7 to 2.6 times length. They eye stalks consist of three segments ending with an oval-shaped eye, featuring dark staining typical of F. protensa. A 2018 reinvestigation found features evident of sexual dimorphism.
