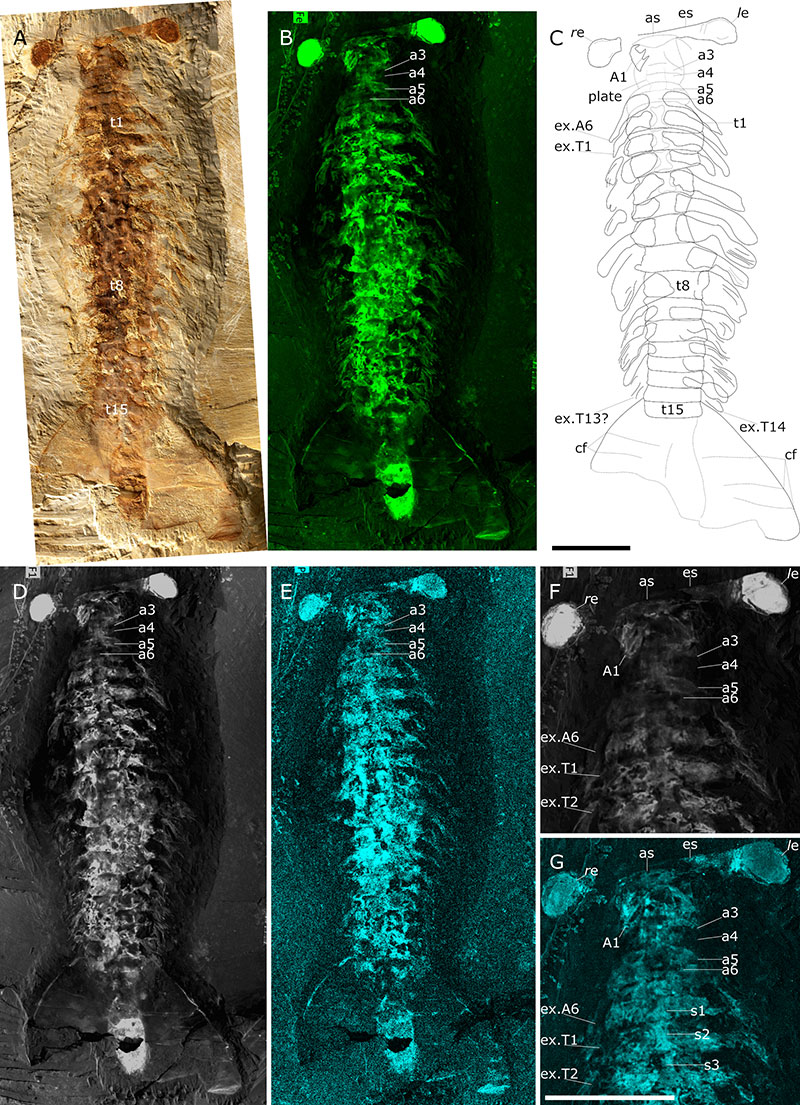
- Holotype specimen of Oura megale

Scientific classification
- Kingdom: Animalia
- Phylum: Arthropoda
- Clade: Deuteropoda
- Genus: †Oura; O'Flynn et al., 2025
- Species: †O. megale

Binomial name
- †Oura megale O'Flynn et al., 2025

= Oura megale =

Oura megale Temporal range: Cambrian Series 2 (Stage 3)

Genus of extinct arthropod

Oura is an extinct genus of deuteropodan arthropod from the Cambrian Stage 3 of the Chengjiang Lagerstätte, located in the Yunnan Province, China. It contains a single species, O. megale. It is most notable for its large, triangular tailpiece. This tailpiece may have improved Oura's maneuverability.

== Discovery and naming ==
Oura was named based on a single specimen, YKLP 17237, found in Yunnan Province, China, in the Chengjiang lagerstätte. Some details of the anatomy of this specimen were lost during preparation. The genus name, Oura, comes from the Greek for tail, while the species name, megale, means large (also in Greek).

== Description ==
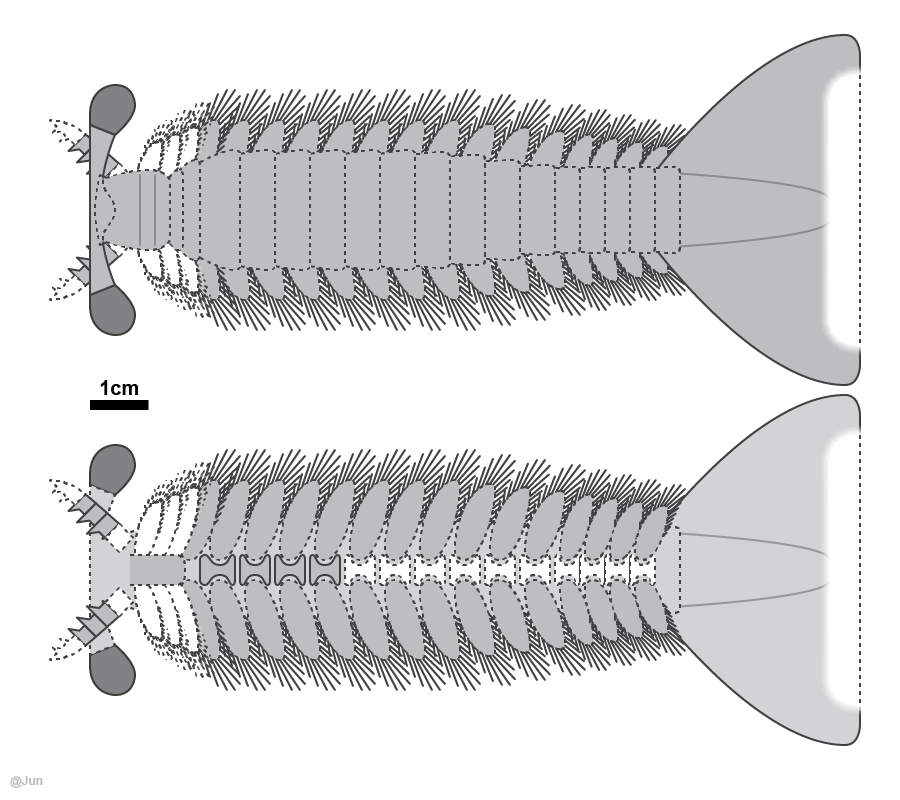
Diagram

Oura is roughly 14 cm (approximately 5.5 in) long. The head is divided into six segments, the frontmost of which bears a pair of stalked eyes. The segment of the head immediately behind the frontmost bears a pair of raptorial frontal appendages with at least 3 podomeres (segments). The thorax is divided into 15 segments. Each of these segments bears a pair of appendages, probably biramous (two-branched). The last of these segments bears a very large and wide triangular tailpiece.

== Taxonomy ==
Oura is member of Deuteropoda, as evidenced by its arthrodization, segmentation of its head and probable possession of biramous appendages. Cladogram after O'Flynn et al. 2025:

- Arthropoda (total group)
  - †Megadictyon
  - - - †Kerygmachela
      - †Pambdelurion
    - - †Opabinia
      - - †Radiodonta (e.g Anomalocaris)
        - Deuteropoda
          - - †Fengzhengia
            - †Kylinxia
          - - †Oura
            - - †Megacheira+Chelicerata
              - - - †Kiisortoqia
                  - †Bushizheia
                - - - - †Occacaris
                      - †Forfexicaris
                    - †Isoxyidae
                  - †Artiopoda (including Trilobita)
                  - Mandibulata

== Paleobiology and paleoecology ==
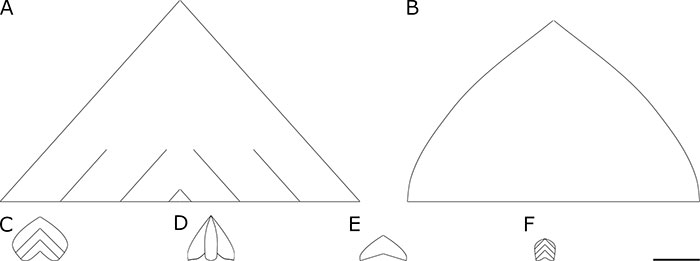
Comparison of the tail pieces of Oura megale (B) and Anomalocaris (A).

Oura was likely a nektonic predator. The large tailpiece likely made Oura more maneuverable while swimming. Its lifestyle may have been somewhat comparable to that of some radiodonts, such as Anomalocaris.
