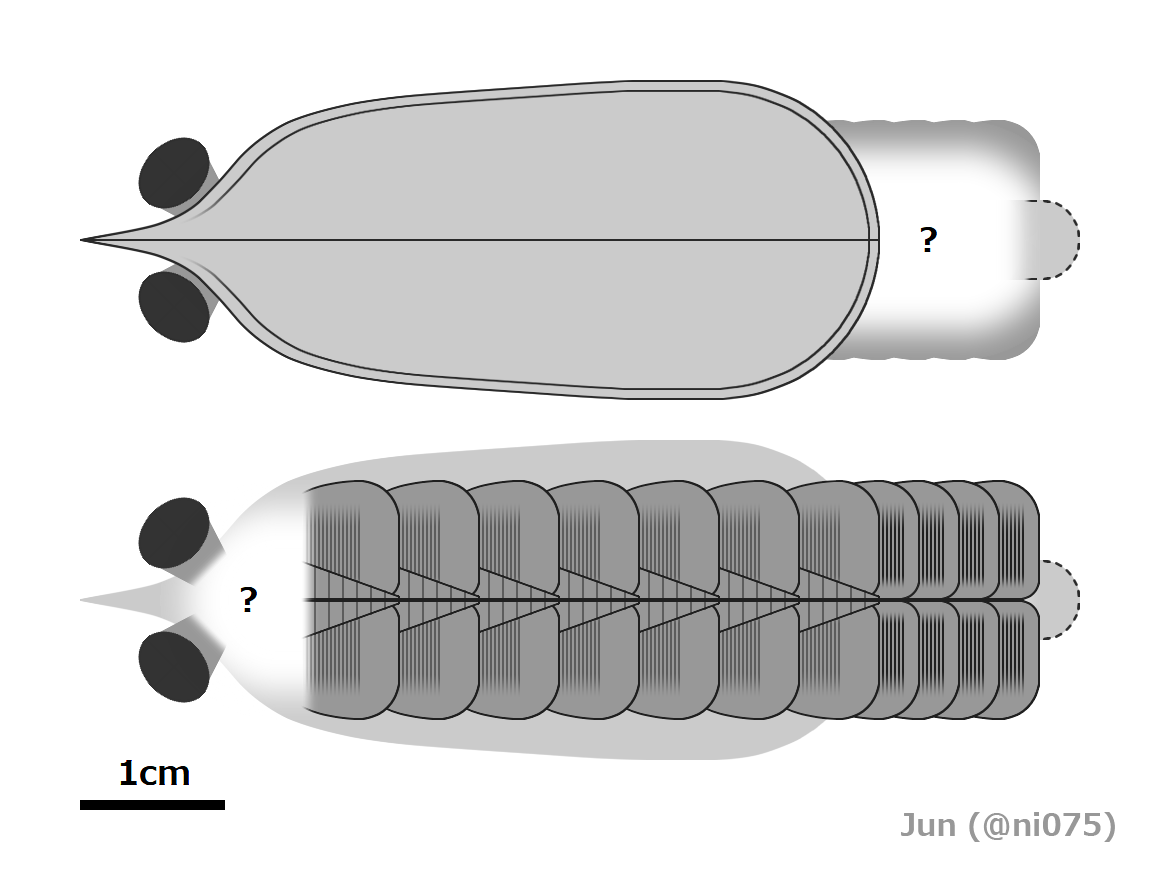
- Schematic reconstruction in dorsal and ventral views
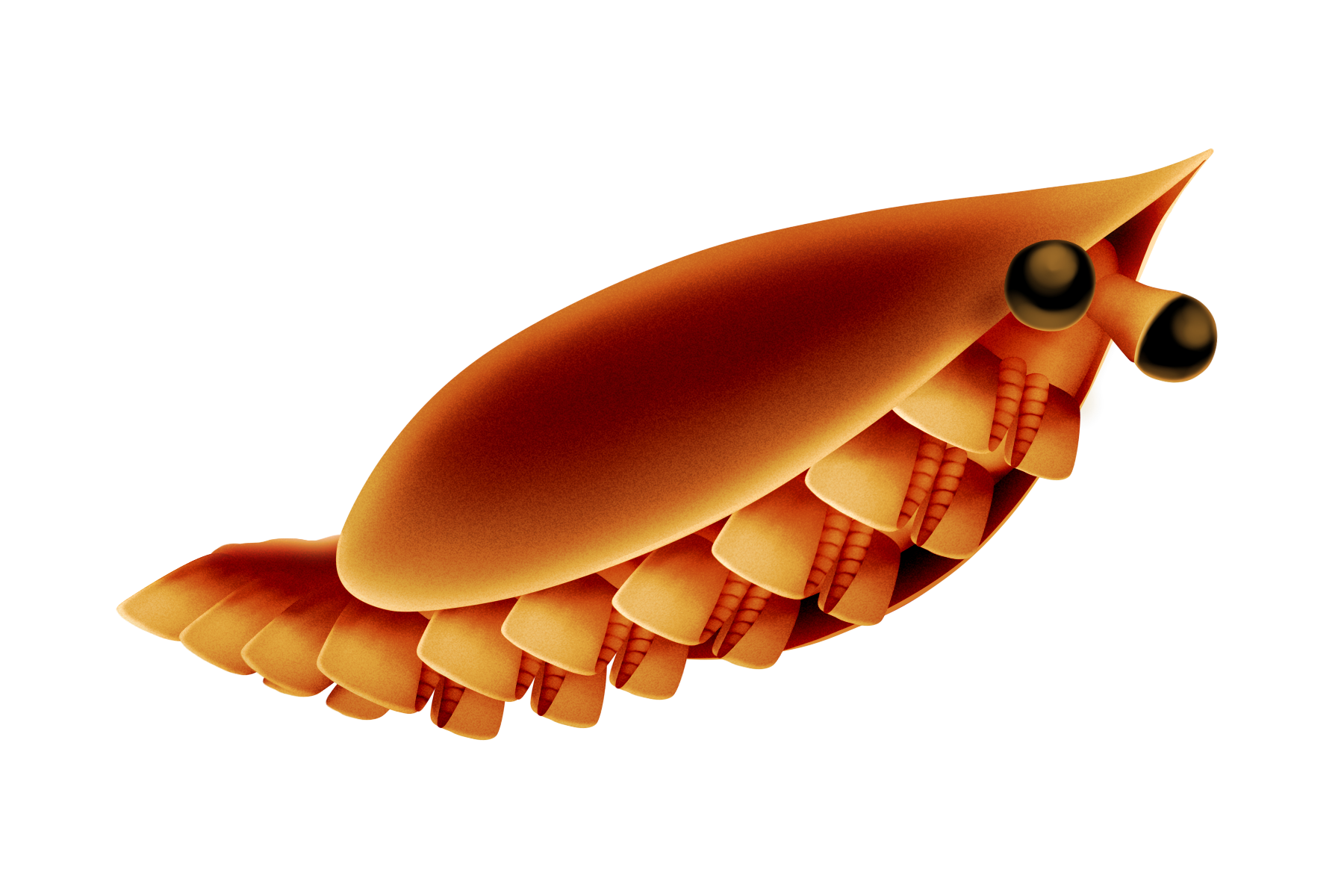
- Life restoration

Scientific classification
- Kingdom: Animalia
- Phylum: Arthropoda
- Genus: †Erratus; Fu et al. 2022

Type species
- Erratus sperare Fu et al. 2022

= Erratus =

Erratus Temporal range: 518 Ma

Extinct genus of Cambrian arthropod

Erratus (Note: From Latin erratus "roaming") is an extinct genus of marine arthropod from the Cambrian of China. Its type and only species is Erratus sperare. (Note: From Latin sperare "to hope") Erratus is likely one of the most basal known arthropods, and its discovery has helped scientists understand the early evolution of arthropod trunk appendages. Some of the stem-arthropods like radiodonts did not have legs, instead they had flap like appendages that helped them swim. Erratus on the other hand had not only flaps but also a set of primitive legs. It also supported the theory that the gills of aquatic arthropods probably evolved into the wings and lungs of terrestrial arthropods later in the Paleozoic.

Fossils of Erratus have been found in the Chengjiang Lagerstätte of China, dating to around 520 million years ago. Erratus was a small, nektonic organism with a bivalved carapace that probably ate by deposit feeding or filter feeding.

== History of study ==
The holotype consists of specimens XDBZ101 and XDBZ102. The paratype specimen, NWUS92-310, had previously been referred to Isoxys auritus. Both specimens were found in the Helinpu Formation in Yunnan, China. Erratus sperare was named by Fu and colleagues in 2022. The genus name is Latin for "roaming", in reference to the inferred nektonic habit of the organism, and the specific name is Latin for "to hope". The holotype specimens consist of a part and counterpart of an individual, and an isolated carapace. The paratype consists of a carapace with an anterior spine, as well as seven anterior body fragments.

=== Significance for understanding arthropod evolution ===
The relationship between the components of the biramous limb of many euarthropod groups, which consists of an exopod and an endopod (appendages), and the lobopods (stubby legs) and flaps of lobopodians and radiodonts has long been controversial. Erratus appears to show one of the earliest steps in the evolution of the endopod, with an unsclerotized endopod fused to a flap that is attached to the body wall, rather than being a branch of the appendage like an exopod. Fu et al. 2022 describes the species as having "unique trunk appendages formed of lateral anomalocaridid-type flaps and ventral subconical endopods". The fossils indicate that the species represent "an intermediate stage of biramous limb evolution".

== Description ==
3D model

Known specimens of Erratus measure 37–72 millimetres (1.5–2.8 in) in length. The arthropod had a bivalved carapace that covered the top, which possesses an anterior spine but rounded posteriorly. A pair of lateral eyes located near the anterior spine of the carapace. The eyes appear to have no lenses, and the stalks appear to be as long as the eyes. On the bottom of the arthropod were 11 pairs of wide body flaps with gill-like wrinklings. The flaps decreased in size towards the bottom of the arthropod. As in gilled lobopodians and radiodonts, the flaps were connected to the body wall. The anterior seven pairs of body flaps each possesses a medially-arranged endopod (inner branch). Each endopod was a simple, 6-segmented leg, lacking any evidences of endites (internal projections) and claws. The posterior four pairs of body flaps lacking endopods, but the wrinklings are more prominent. Ventral head structures between the eyes and body flaps are yet to be discovered, it is also uncertain if the trunk-end possesses a telson.

== Classification ==
A phylogenetic analysis conducted by Fu et al. 2022 found that Erratus was a basal arthropod, branched before isoxyids (Isoxys and Surusicaris) and other euarthropods (hymenocarines, fuxianhuiids, megacheirans, trilobites and so on), but more derived than other stem-arthropods like gilled lobopodians (Pambdelurion and Kerygmachela), Opabinia and radiodonts (Anomalocaris, Hurdia and so on).

Cladogram after Liu et al. 2026:

- Panarthropoda
  - † "Lobopodia" (paraphyletic, ancestral to tardigrades, onychophorans and arthropods)
  - Total group Euarthropoda
    - †Megadictyon
    - - - †Kerygmachela
        - - †Pambdelurion
          - - †Opabiniidae
            - - † Radiodonta (e.g Anomalocaris)
              - Deuteropoda
                - †Erratus
                - - †Sunella
                  - - †Isoxyidae + "Great appendage bivalved forms"
                    - - - †Fengzhengia
                        - †Kylinxia
                      - - †Megacheira
                        - Pan-Chelicerata
                      - - †Kiisortoqia
                        - †Bushizheia
                        - Antennulata
                          - †Artiopoda (including Trilobita)
                          - Mandibulata
                            - †Fuxianhuiida
                            - - †Hymenocarina
                              - - Myriapoda
                                - Pancrustacea

== Paleoecology ==
Erratus was a member of the Chengjiang Biota, which dates to the Cambrian period, 520 million years ago. During this time the area was a tropical region with sea level changes and tectonic activity. Most of the fauna were primarily benthic, and were probably buried via turbidity currents. Brachiopods, ctenophores, phoronids, lobopodians, worms, primitive chordates, and other arthropods are represented in the biota. The site is known for its incredible preservation of fossils similar to that of the younger Burgess Shale.

== See also ==
- Kylinxia – Another taxon proposed to be transitional between radiodonts and euarthropods
