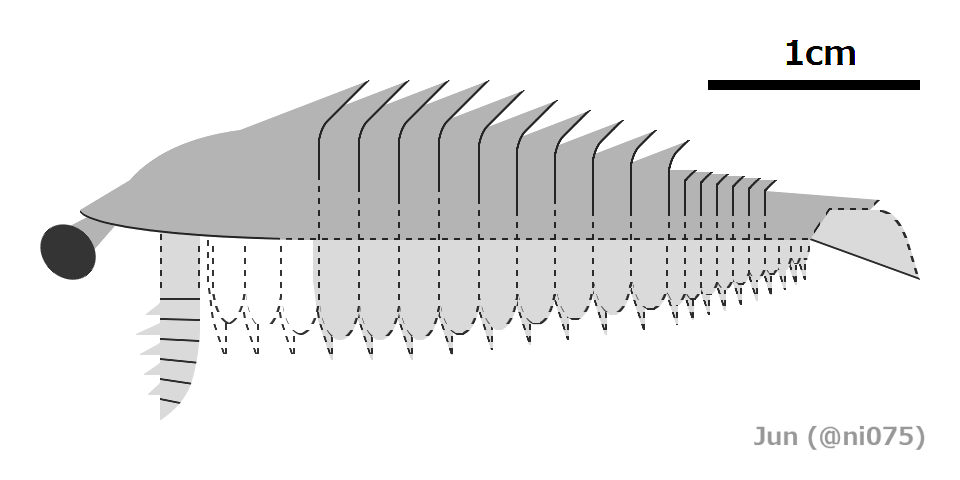
- Diagrammatic reconstruction
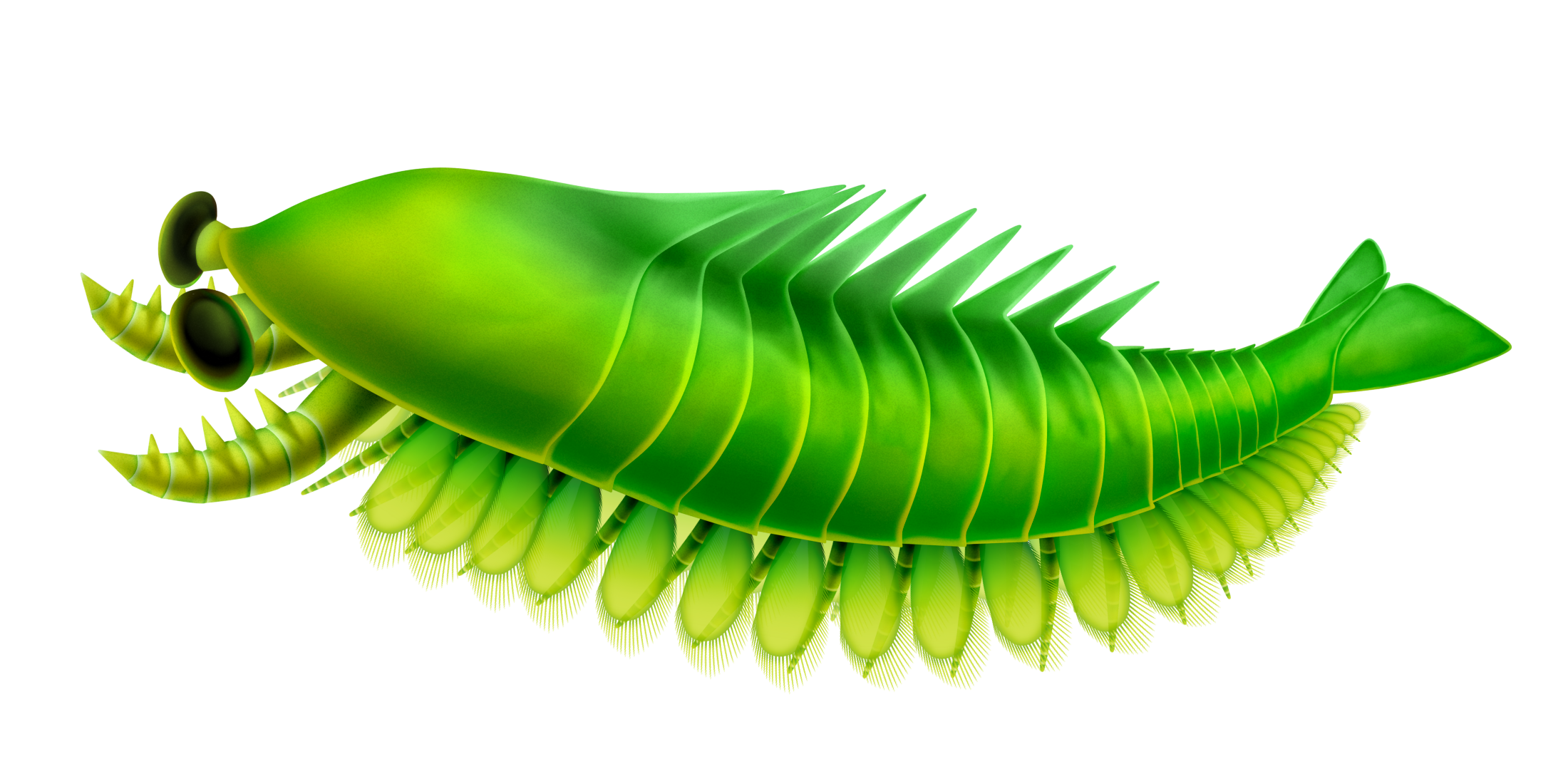
- Life restoration

Scientific classification
- Kingdom: Animalia
- Phylum: Arthropoda
- Genus: †Fengzhengia; O'Flynn et al., 2022
- Species: †F. mamingae

Binomial name
- †Fengzhengia mamingae O'Flynn et al., 2022

= Fengzhengia =

Fengzhengia Temporal range: Cambrian Stage 3

Extinct genus of arthropod

Fengzhengia is an extinct genus of arthropod known from a single species, Fengzhengia mamingae from the Cambrian aged Chengjiang Biota of Yunnan, China. It is thought to be a basal arthropod, as one of the most basal members of Deuteropoda. Like other basal deuteropods, Fengzhengia has an upward curling pair of "frontal appendages" with at least 6 segments which bear endites, contrasting with the downward curving pair of frontal appendages possessed by radiodonts. The head has a pair of stalked eyes. The trunk had 15 tergites the first nine of which had upward facing spines, with the trunk terminating with a tail fan. The trunk seemingly had pairs of biramous limbs, with paddle-shaped exopods. It is thought to have been nektobenthic (swimming just above the sediment), and either a scavenger or a predator. A close relationship with the genus Kylinxia has been suggested.

Cladogram after O’Flynn et al, 2023:

- Total group Arthropoda
  - "Gilled lobopodians" (Pambdelurion, Kerygmachela)
  - - Opabinia
    - - Radiodonta (e.g Anomalocaris)
      - Deuteropoda
        - - Kylinxia
          - Fengzhengia
        - - - Kiisortoqia
            - Bushizheia
          - - Megacheira
            - - Habeliida
              - - Mollisonia
                - Chelicerata (horseshoe crabs, sea spiders, arachnids, etc)
          - - - "Great appendage bivalved forms" (Occacaris, Forfexicaris)
              - Isoxyida
            - - Artiopoda (including Trilobita)
              - Mandibulata
                - Fuxianhuiida
                - - Myriapoda (millipedes, centipedes, etc)
                  - - Hymenocarina
                    - Pancrustacea (crustaceans, insects, etc)

== See also ==
- Erratus a basal deuteropodan arthropod from the Cambrian of China
