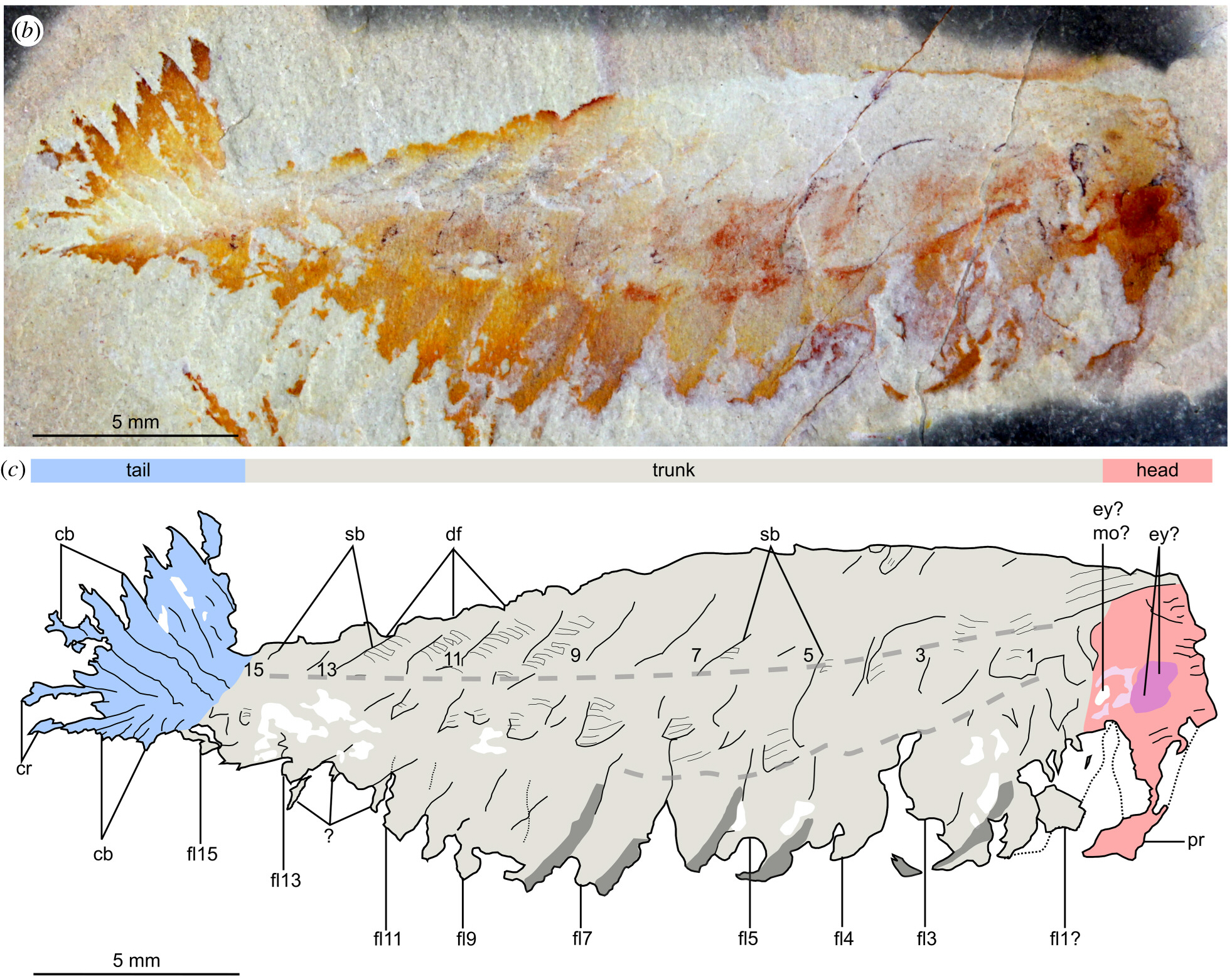
- Holotype specimen of Utaurora comosa (KUMIP 314087)

Scientific classification
- Kingdom: Animalia
- Stem group: Arthropoda
- Class: †Dinocaridida
- Order: †Opabiniida
- Family: †Opabiniidae
- Genus: †Utaurora; Pates et al., 2022

Type species
- †Utaurora comosa Pates et al., 2022

= Utaurora =

Utaurora Temporal range: Middle Cambrian, ~507 Ma

Extinct genus of opabiniid

Utaurora is an extinct genus of opabiniid, which were stem-arthropods closely related to true arthropods and radiodonts; the type species is U. comosa. The animal's fossils come from the Cambrian of Utah. This genus is the only other known unquestionable opabiniid, with the other being Opabinia itself. There are other animals like Myoscolex and Mieridduryn that could be opabiniids, but the classification of those two genera is still debated.

== History of study ==
The holotype specimen of Utaurora comosa, KUMIP 314087, was collected from the Wheeler Formation in Utah. It was initially described as a specimen of Anomalocaris in 2008. In 2022, Pates et al. reinterpreted the specimen as an opabiniid and described it as a new genus and species.

=== Etymology ===
Utaurora is a portmanteau of Utah, in reference to where the specimen was found, and Aurora, the name of a Roman goddess. The reference to Aurora was chosen as she is a goddess of the dawn who turned her lover into an insect, and Utaurora is an early species close to the origin of arthropods. The species name is Latin for "hairy" or "leafy", and refers to the appearance of the animal, with a hairy-looking dorsal surface and leaf-like arrangement of caudal blades.

== Description ==
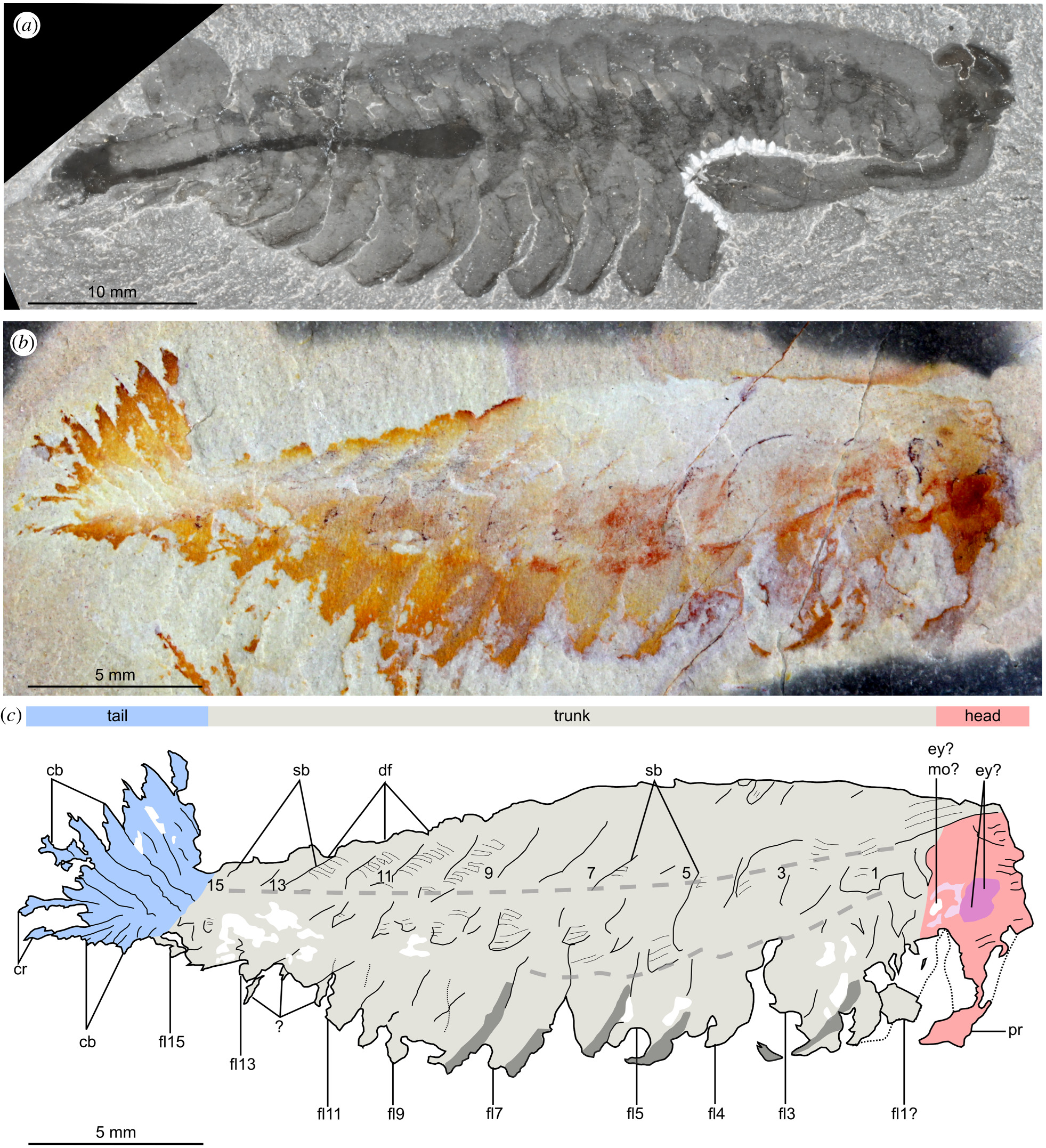
A comparison of Opabinia regalis (top) and Utaurora comosa (Middle and bottom)

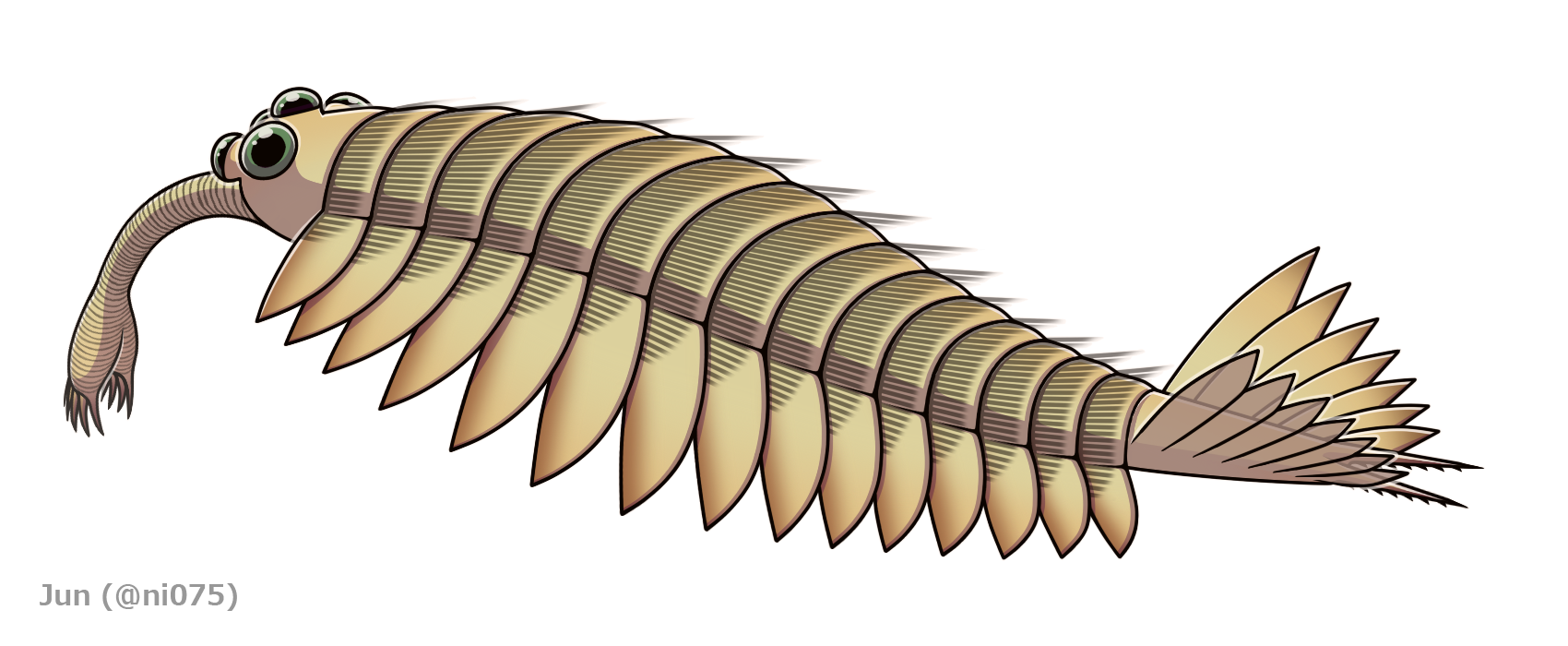
Reconstruction

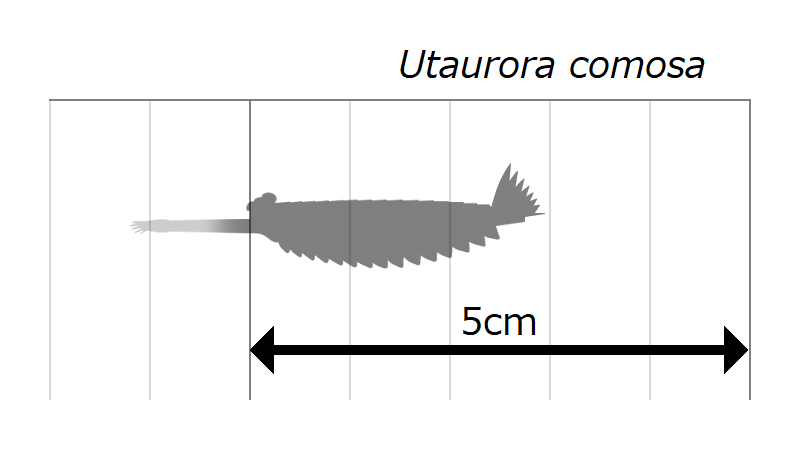
Size estimation

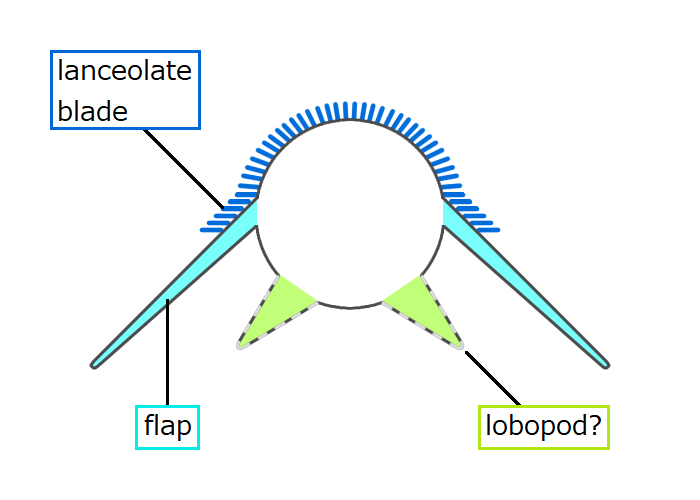
Cross section

Utaurora closely resembles Opabinia and Kylinxia, a pair of arthropods from the Burgess Shale and the Maotianshan Shales respectively, with 5 eyes and frontal appendages. Due to the incomplete discovery, it is uncertain whether Utaurora have these features as well. Utaurora differs from Opabinia in having more extensive setal blades covering its back and proximal region of each lateral flaps (covering only lateral flaps in Opabinia), giving it a hairy appearance, and in having a tail fan composed of at least 7 pairs of caudal blades (3 in Opabinia).

== Classification ==
- - Aysheaia
  - Onychodictyon
  - Tardigrada
  - Onychophora
  - - - Megadictyon
      - Jianshanopodia
    - - Hadranax
      - - Kerygmachela
        - - Pambdelurion
          - - - Utaurora
              - Opabinia
            - - Aegirocassis
              - Peytoia
              - Schinderhannes bartelsi
              - - Cambroraster
                - Hurdia
              - - - Amplectobelua
                  - Lyrarapax
                  - - Anomalocaris
                    - Houcaris
                - Deuteropoda

Phylogenetic position of Utaurora within Panarthropoda, according to the original description. Opabiniidae is highlighted in pink.

Based on its similarity to Opabinia, the discoverers of Utaurora classified it in Opabiniidae. Their phylogenetic analyses generally found support for an opabiniid position. A third possible opabiniid, Myoscolex is known from rocks of the Emu Bay Shale in South Australia. However, because morphological features supporting this classification are controversial, a hypothesis has been put forward suggesting It may also have been an early annelid that resembled Pikaia.
