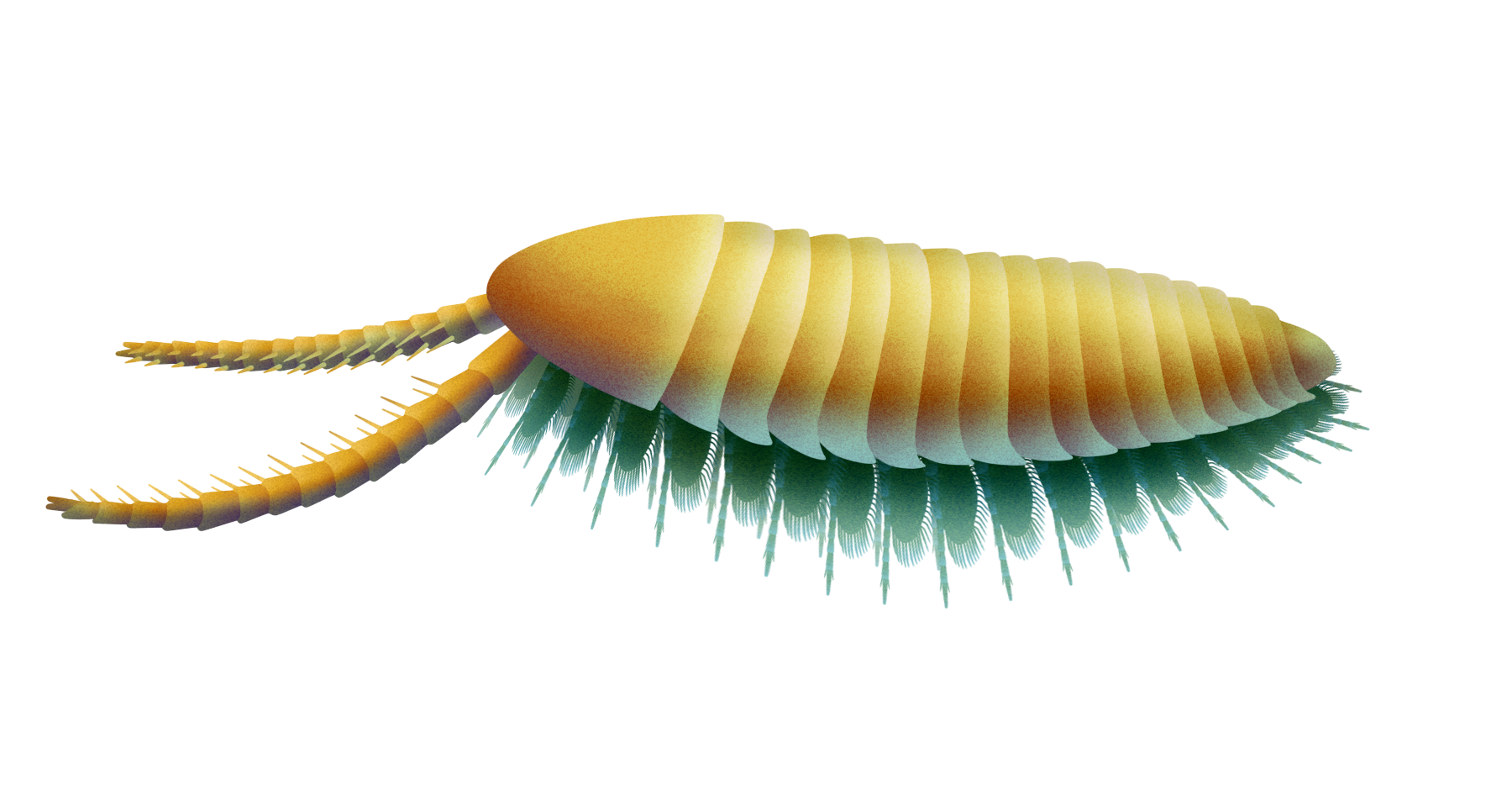
- Life restoration

Scientific classification
- Kingdom: Animalia
- Phylum: Arthropoda
- Genus: †Kiisortoqia; Stein, 2010
- Species: †K. soperi

Binomial name
- †Kiisortoqia soperi Stein, 2010

= Kiisortoqia =

Kiisortoqia Temporal range: Sirius Passet

Extinct genus of arthropods

Kiisortoqia soperi is an extinct species of arthropod from the Early Cambrian Sirius Passet Lagerstätte in Greenland. While it had a superficially trilobite-like bodyform, it also possessed large frontal appendages similar to those of radiodonts.

== Description ==
Size comparison based on the type specimen

The body of K. soperi consisted of a simple head shield, 16 trunk segments (tergites) and a tail plate. In outward appearance the body is almost elliptical, about twice as long as wide, with the widest point in the front third of the body at the 3rd to 5th tergite.

The head plate was simple, convex in shape, wider than long, and represented about 20% of the total body length. The tergites were short, about five times as wide as long, and the rear edge of each tergite overlapped the following by about a fifth of its length. The tergites 1–5 all had about the same width, the following tergites becoming narrower towards the posterior end of the animal. In the middle of the tergites an axis can be clearly seen, which constituted about half the width of a tergite and gave it a three-lobed shape. At the lateral ends of each tergite existed spines which increased in length towards the tail. The tiny tail was semi-circular, about half as long as wide. The front half to two-thirds of the tail shield also has a three-lobed shape.

The first segment bore a ventral pair of large appeandages, which are about half to two-thirds as long as the body. They consisted of a cylindrical stem and about 15 segments. The segments had a flat outer side and two widely spaced spines.

The other limbs – three pairs in the head region shield and 16 on the body segments – composed of two branches. The basipod (basal segment) was long, trapezoid-shaped and had two rows with different numbers of spines. The exopods (upper branches of the limbs) were paddle-like lobes, which were fringed with bristles. The length was little more than two thirds of the length of the endopodite (lower, leg-like limb branches).

Its gut is occasionally preserved in three dimensions, perhaps in phosphate.

== Ecology ==
It is believed that Kiisortoqia was a predatory swimmer. The large paddle-like exopods were probably suitable for swimming. With its robust appendages, K. soperi could capture prey, probably using its prickly basipods to bring them to its mouth.

== Etymology ==
The name of the genus is derived from the Greenlandic word kiisortoq, meaning "predator" or "hunter". The specific epithet is in honor of Norman John (Jack) Soper who, together with A. K. Higgins, discovered the Sirius Passet fauna and collected the first fossils from the locality.

== Distribution ==
More than 170 specimens of the species were recovered in the course of several expeditions between 1985 and 2006 from the Lower Cambrian Sirius Passet Konservat-Lagerstätte, in Peary Land, northern Greenland. The specimens are usually more or less completely preserved: disarticulated fossils were not discovered.

== Systematic position ==
Kiisortoqia soperi possesses three crown-arthropod homologies: a head shield with three pairs of limbs, plus the appendages; postappendage biramous limbs; and flap-like exopods fringed with setae. An exact position within the arthropods, however, cannot be determined, due to the possible lack of eyes and the ambiguous shape of the tail plate. A possible synapomorphy of the appendages with the chelicerates is purely speculative. A later cladistic analysis resolved Kiisortoqia as sister to the rest of crown-group arthropods studied. A later study also suggested it was closely related to the morphologically similar Bushizheia known from the Chengjiang Biota of China. A close relationship with Artiopoda, which includes trilobites and their close relatives, has been suggested by some analyses.

Cladogram after O’Flynn et al, 2023:

- Total group Arthropoda
  - "Gilled lobopodians" (Pambdelurion, Kerygmachela)
  - - Opabinia
    - - Radiodonta (e.g Anomalocaris)
      - Deuteropoda
        - - Kylinxia
          - Fengzhengia
        - - - Kiisortoqia
            - Bushizheia
          - - Megacheira
            - - Habeliida
              - - Mollisonia
                - Chelicerata (horseshoe crabs, sea spiders, arachnids, etc)
          - - - "Great appendage bivalved forms" (Occacaris, Forfexicaris)
              - Isoxyida
            - - Artiopoda (including Trilobita)
              - Mandibulata
                - Fuxianhuiida
                - - Myriapoda (millipedes, centipedes, etc)
                  - - Hymenocarina
                    - Pancrustacea (crustaceans, insects, etc)
