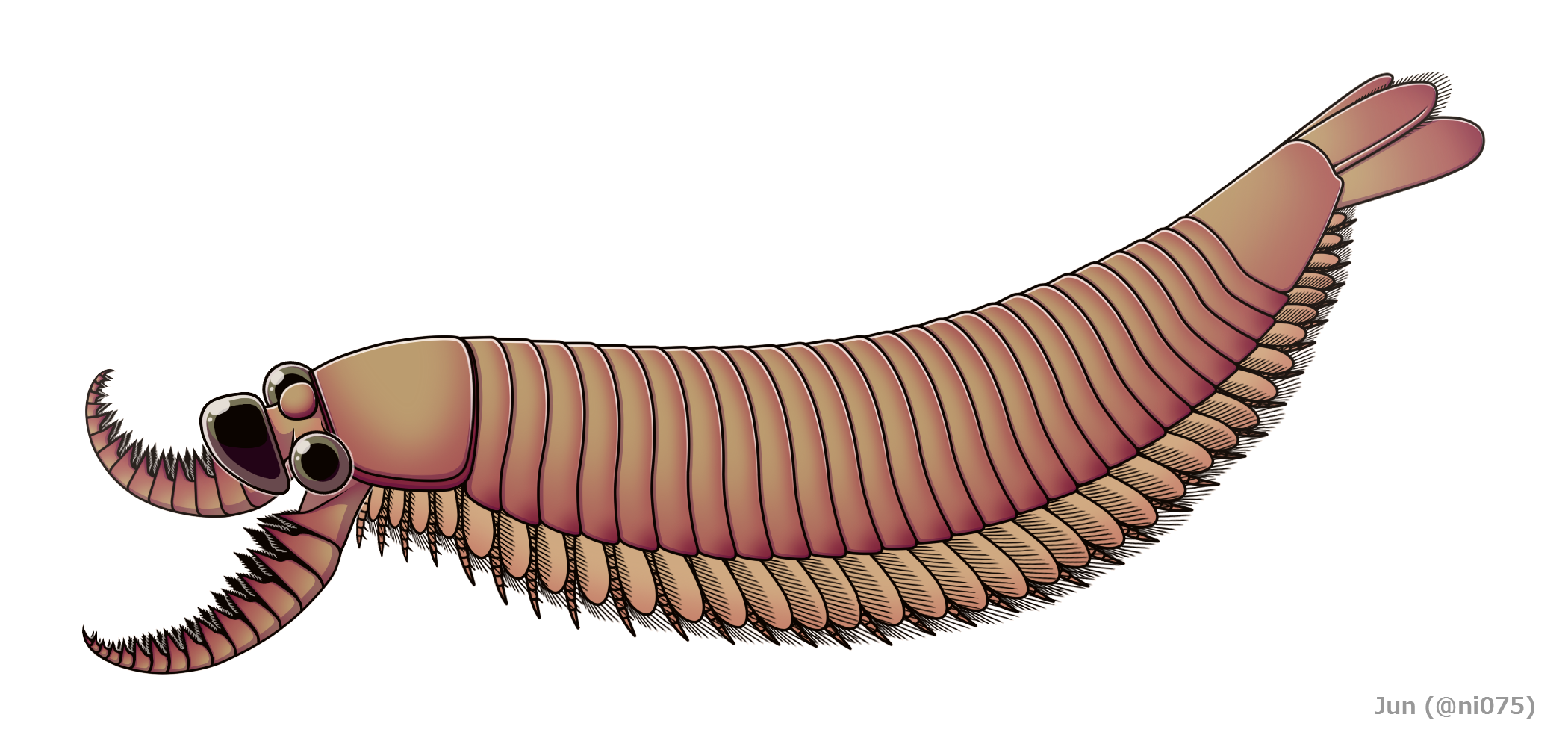
- Life restoration of Kylinxia zhangi, a basal deuteropod
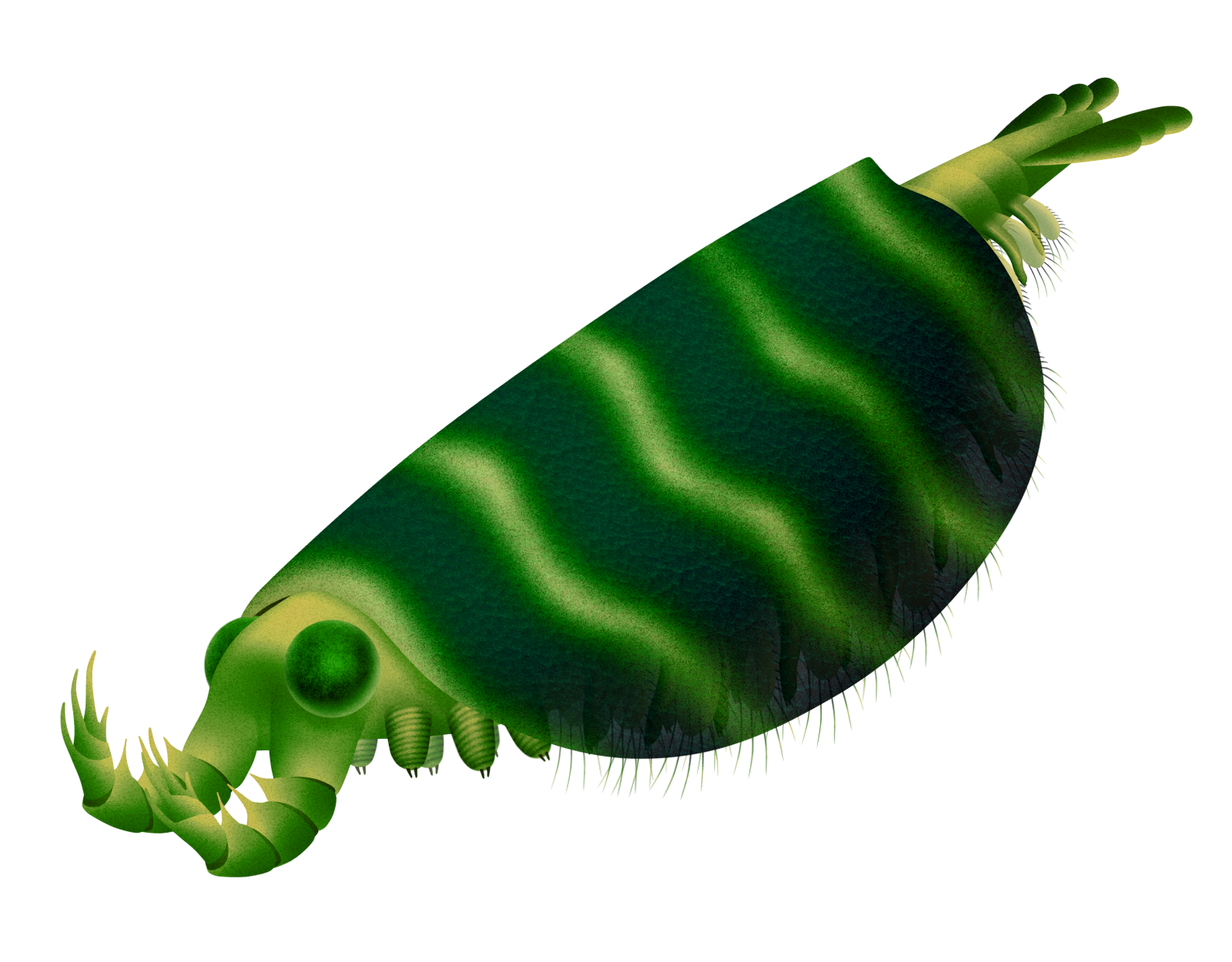
- Life restoration of Surusicaris (Isoxyidae), a likely basal deuteropod

Scientific classification
- Kingdom: Animalia
- Phylum: Arthropoda
- Clade: Deuteropoda; Ortega-Hernández 2016

Subphyla and classes
- †Burgessia; †Bushizheia; †Cucumericrus?; †Erratus; †Fengzhengia; †Forfexicaris; †Kiisortoqia; †Kylinxia; †Occacaris; †Oreinorema?; †Oura; †Sarotrocercus; †Sunellidae; †Artiopoda (including Trilobita); †Bradoriida; †Fuxianhuiida; †Isoxyida; †Marrellomorpha; †Megacheira; Chelicerata; Mandibulata

= Deuteropoda =

Deuteropoda Temporal range: Cambrian–Present

Clade of arthropods

Deuteropoda is a clade of arthropods whose members are distinguished from more basal stem-group arthropods like radiodonts by an anatomical reorganization of the head region (which is proposed to include a differentiated, titular "deutocerebral" first appendage pair, a multisegmented head, and a hypostome/labrum complex), and by bearing pairs of segmented biramous (two branched) limbs.

The clade contains all living arthropods (i.e. chelicerates and mandibulates) as well as several fossil groups that share these characteristics (e.g. Fuxianhuiida, Megacheira, Isoxyida, and Artiopoda, the last of which includes the trilobites), while excluding other fossil groups that are more 'basal' or 'primitive' (e.g. radiodonts, opabiniids and lobopodians). Members of Deuteropoda that are basal to the last common ancestor of chelicerates and mandibulates (and thus lie outside the crown group of Arthropoda) are often referred to as "upper stem group arthropods".

== Defining characteristics ==
Head appendage innervation in stem group arthropods and Deuteropoda

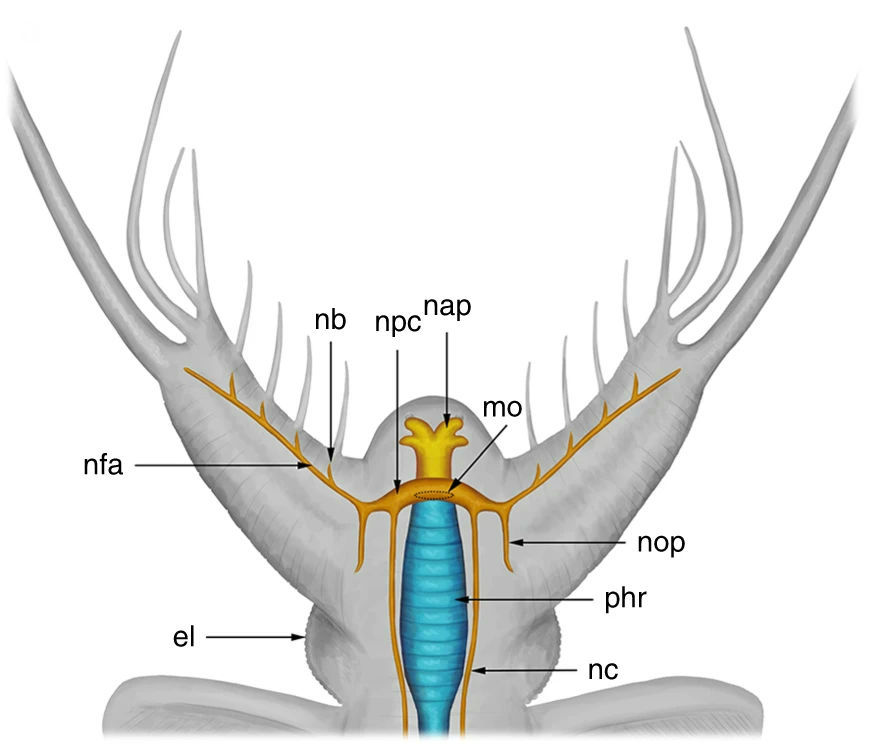
Diagram of the head of the "gilled lobopodian" Kerygmachela, showing the frontal appendage being innervated by the protocerebrum (labeled npc)

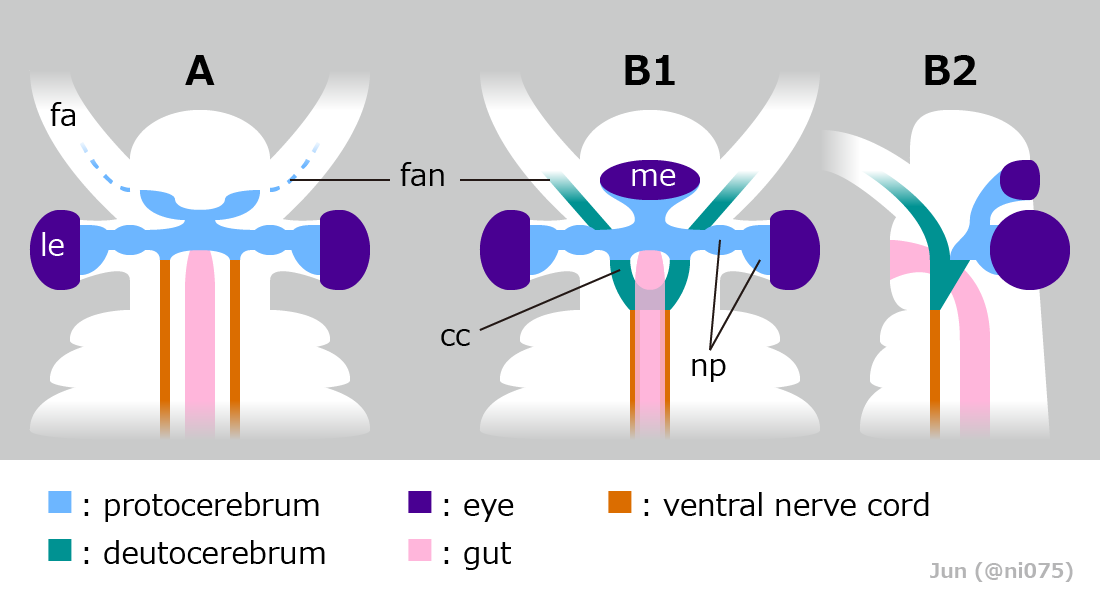
Diagrams of the brain of a member of Radiodonta, showing contrasting protocerebral (A) and deutocerebral (B) interpretations of the frontal appendage (fa)

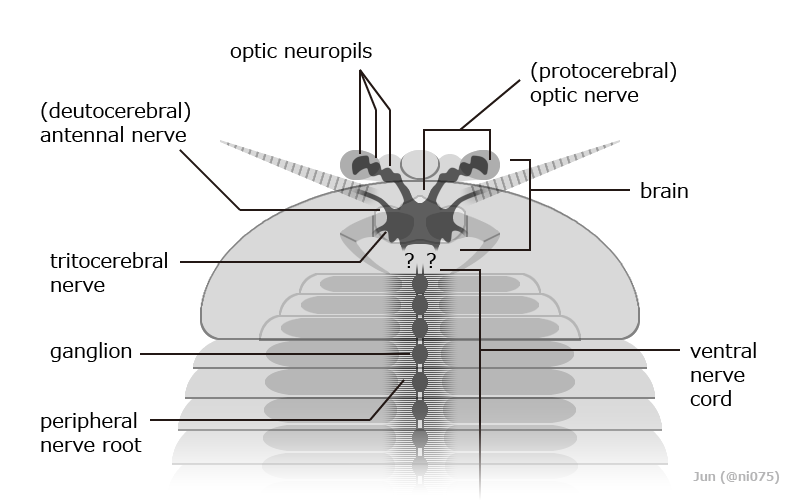
Nerve diagram of a member of Fuxianhuiida (Deuteropoda) showing the first appendage, the antennae, being innervated by the deutocerebrum

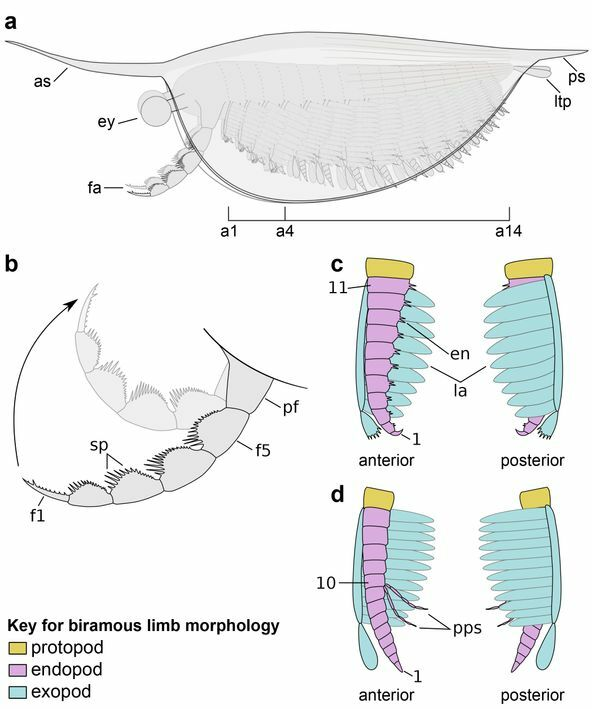
Diagram of primitive deuteropod Isoxys curvirostratus showing upward-curling grasping first appendage as well as two branched (biramous) limbs consisting of an inner endopod and outer exopod, as is characteristic of Deuteropoda.

Javier Ortega-Hernández in his 2016 study naming the clade, proposed that Deuteropoda is differentiated from more basal total group arthropods by the presence of a differentiated labrum (an often flap-like structure at the front of the mouth) and a differentiated first pair of appendages connected by nerves (innervated) to a part of the brain called the deutocerebrum (making them "deutocerebral"). In contrast onychophorans (velvet worms) and "gilled lobopodians" (which are more closely related to arthropods than to onychophorans) have a pair of enlarged pre-ocular (located in front of the eyes) appendages (which form the antennae in onychophorans and the frontal appendages of "gilled lobopodians"), innervated by a part of the brain called the protocerebrum (making them "protocerebral"). These appendages have been proposed by a number of authors to be homologous to (derived from the same ancestral structure) and to have ultimately evolved to be the labrum of modern living arthropods, as well as to the segmented frontal appendages of radiodonts, which these authors argue was protocerebral. In living arthropods, the deutocerebral first appendage corresponds to the first pair (or only pair in some taxa) of antennae in mandibulates (as well in the extinct artiopods like trilobites) and the chelicerae in chelicerates. All deuteropods are suggested to have a multi-segmented head with at least three segments including from front to back, the protocerebrum (which in modern arthropods innervates the eyes), deutocerebrum and tritocerebrum. The head in non-deuteropodan stem-group arthropods including radiodonts is often suggested in contrast to have been composed of a single segment including the protocerebrum.

While the clade comprising Deuteropoda (though not necessarily the name itself) is well accepted, the characters Ortega-Hernández proposed as supporting Deuteropoda are somewhat controversial, with a number of authors arguing that the transformation of the head from radiodonts to early deuteropods is less radical than proposed, and argue that there is no clear evidence of a switch between a protocerebral head appendage in radiodonts to a deutocerebral one in Deuteropoda, with some authors arguing that brains of radiodonts (as well as possibly also "gilled lobopodians" like Kerygmachela) were at least two-segmented rather than single segmented and that their frontal appendages were in fact deutocerebral, or that the first head appendages of early "deuteropodans" like megacheirans were in fact protocerebral.

Many early primitive deuteropod first appendages like those in Kylinxia, isoxyids and megacheirans are segmented grasping appendages that are upward (dorsally)-curling, as opposed to downward curling like the frontal appendages of radiodonts, which may represent a shared ancestral trait for most or all of Deuteropoda. It is disputed whether or not the upward-curling grasping appendage of early deuteropods are homologous to the segmented frontal appendage of radiodonts (as well as ultimately the annulated, unsegmented frontal appendages of "gilled lobopodians" and siberiid lobopodians like Megadictyon, to which radiodont frontal appendages are widely agreed to be homologous), to which they show strong structural similarities, or that they were convergently evolved separately. These grasping appendages of early deuteropods are suggested to have evolved into the chelicerae of chelicerates and the antennae of mandibulates. Some authors have suggested, in attempts to resolve the dispute as to whether the frontal appendage of radiodonts is homologous to the labrum (which displays gene activity related to limb development) or to the deuterocerebral appendage of deuteropods, that the genes and body organisation related the radiodont frontal appendage became duplicated when the head became divided into additional segments, and that the frontal appendage of radiodonts is therefore homologous to both the labrum and the deuterocerebral appendage.

Members of Deuteropoda lack the oral cone mouth present in radiodonts (with the radiodont oral cone homologous to toothed, typically radially arranged mouthparts found in lobopodians and other ecdysozoans), but instead ancestrally possess a posteriorly facing mouth on the underside of the head, which is at least sometimes covered by a hypostome (a plate-like structure). Another distinctive characteristic ancestrally present in deuteropodans (with the possible exception of the radiodont-like Oreinorema) but not more basal stem-arthropods is the presence of two-branched (biramous) segmented (arthropodized) limbs divided into an inner endopod and outer exopod, running along the body posterior to the mouth, distinct from the swimming flaps present in radiodonts and "gilled lobopodians" and the lobopods of lobopodians, though the appendages of many modern arthropods are secondarily uniramous (unbranched). The segmentation of the body limbs may have evolved from the co-option of the genes causing the segmentation of the first head appendage in the Deuteropoda-Radiodonta common ancestor. Most deuteropods (with the notable exception of Erratus and isoxyids among Cambrian deuteropods) also have a clearly segmented and jointed (arthrodized) trunk (main body section), though this has been lost in some highly specialized parasitic lineages such as in rhizocephalans and pentastomids.

== Phylogeny ==
Deuteropoda was coined because there was longstanding disagreement about the precise scope of the clades "Arthropoda" and "Euarthropoda", with "Arthropoda" sometimes even including tardigrades and onychophorans in some uses (which would make it equivalent to modern Panarthropoda), and Euarthropoda sometimes considered as comprising the arthropod crown group only (i.e. the least inclusive group including the last common ancestor of chelicerates and mandibulates and all of its descendants).

Historically, the phylogeny of what would become recognised as Deuteropoda, was heavily disputed, with authors during the mid 2010s generally favouring a "long stem-lineage" scenario, where many Cambrian arthropod groups such as the fuxianhuiids, hymenocarines, and megacheirans were various basal offshoots that diverged before the split between the ancestors of Mandibulata and Chelicerata. However, as of the mid 2020s, most researchers favour a "short-stem lineage" or "deep split" scenario, where only relatively few taxa are members of Deuteropoda but outside the Mandibulata-Chelicerata split. This group generally includes Kylinxia, Erratus, and the isoxyids, with fuxianhuiids and hymenocarines now generally considered mandibulates, and megacheirans often considered stem-chelicerates. Artiopoda (including trilobites) is generally interpreted as having descended from the Chelicerata-Mandibulata last common ancestor (and thus part of the arthropod crown group), though whether artiopods are more closely related to chelicerates or mandibulates is disputed. Features of the trunk have been taken as supporting a relationship between artiopods and chelicerates, while supporters of a closer relationship of artiopods with mandibulates note that in both groups, their deutocerebral first head appendages are unbranched antennae (a trait also shared with marrellomorphs, who may also be closely related).

The cladogram below is a possible panarthropod phylogeny, taking into account the differentiation between "lower stem group arthropods" (Total group Euarthropoda) and "upper stem group arthropods" (Deuteropoda), based on a phylogenetic analysis published in 2026. Not all parts of this cladogram are universally accepted, as some other studies have found a closer relationship to Chelicerata than to Mandibulata for Artiopoda, and for Megacheira to be outside crown-group Arthropoda.

- Panarthropoda
  - † "Lobopodia" (paraphyletic, ancestral to tardigrades, onychophorans and arthropods)
  - Total group Euarthropoda
    - †Megadictyon
    - - - †Kerygmachela
        - - †Pambdelurion
          - - †Opabiniidae
            - - † Radiodonta (e.g Anomalocaris)
              - Deuteropoda
                - †Erratus
                - - †Sunella
                  - - †Isoxyidae + "Great appendage bivalved forms"
                    - - - †Fengzhengia
                        - †Kylinxia
                      - - †Megacheira
                        - Pan-Chelicerata
                      - - †Kiisortoqia
                        - †Bushizheia
                        - Antennulata
                          - †Artiopoda (including Trilobita)
                          - Mandibulata
                            - †Fuxianhuiida
                            - - †Hymenocarina
                              - - Myriapoda
                                - Pancrustacea
