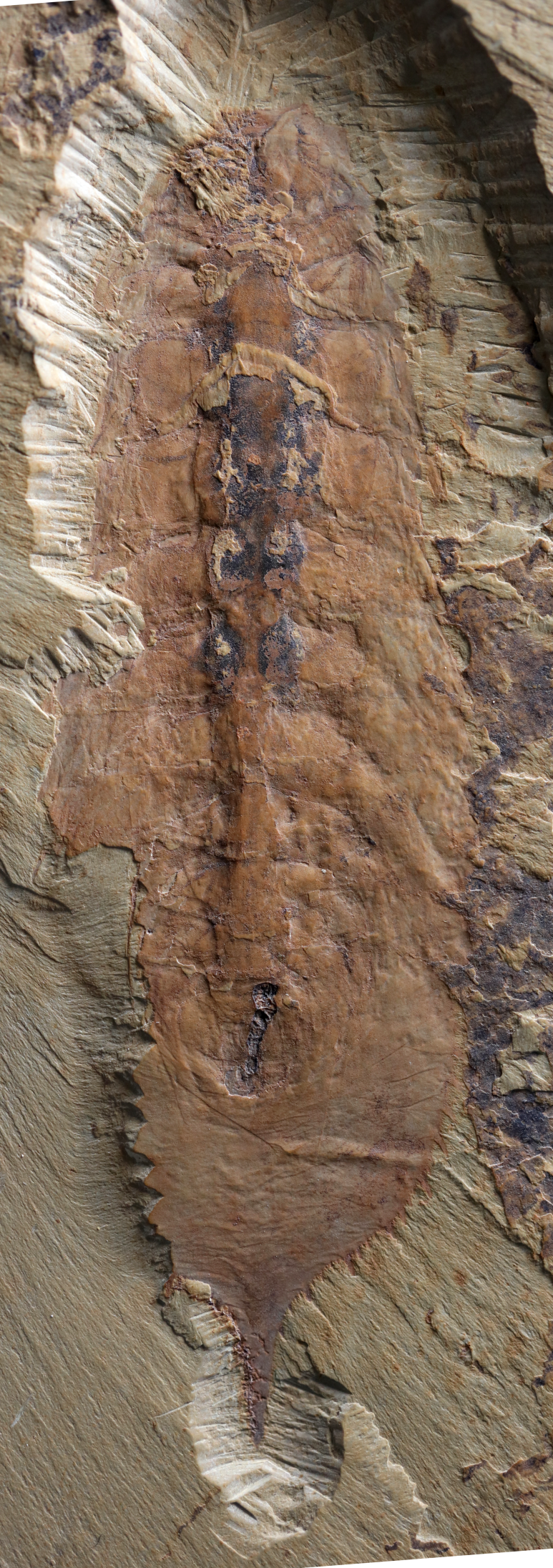
- Fossil of Bushizheia

Scientific classification
- Kingdom: Animalia
- Phylum: Arthropoda
- Genus: †Bushizheia; O'Flynn & Liu, 2020
- Species: †B. yangi

Binomial name
- †Bushizheia yangi O'Flynn & Liu, 2020

= Bushizheia =

Bushizheia Temporal range: 518 Ma

Extinct genus of arthropods

Bushizheia is an extinct genus of arthropods known from a single specimen found in the Early Cambrian Maotianshan Shales Lagerstätte in China. The genus contains a single species, Bushizheia yangi. While it had a superficially trilobite-like bodyform, it also possessed large frontal appendages similar to those of radiodonts. It is morphologically similar to Kiisortoqia to which it is probably closely related. The body of Bushizheia consisted of a simple head shield, eight trunk segments, and a tail plate.

== Description ==
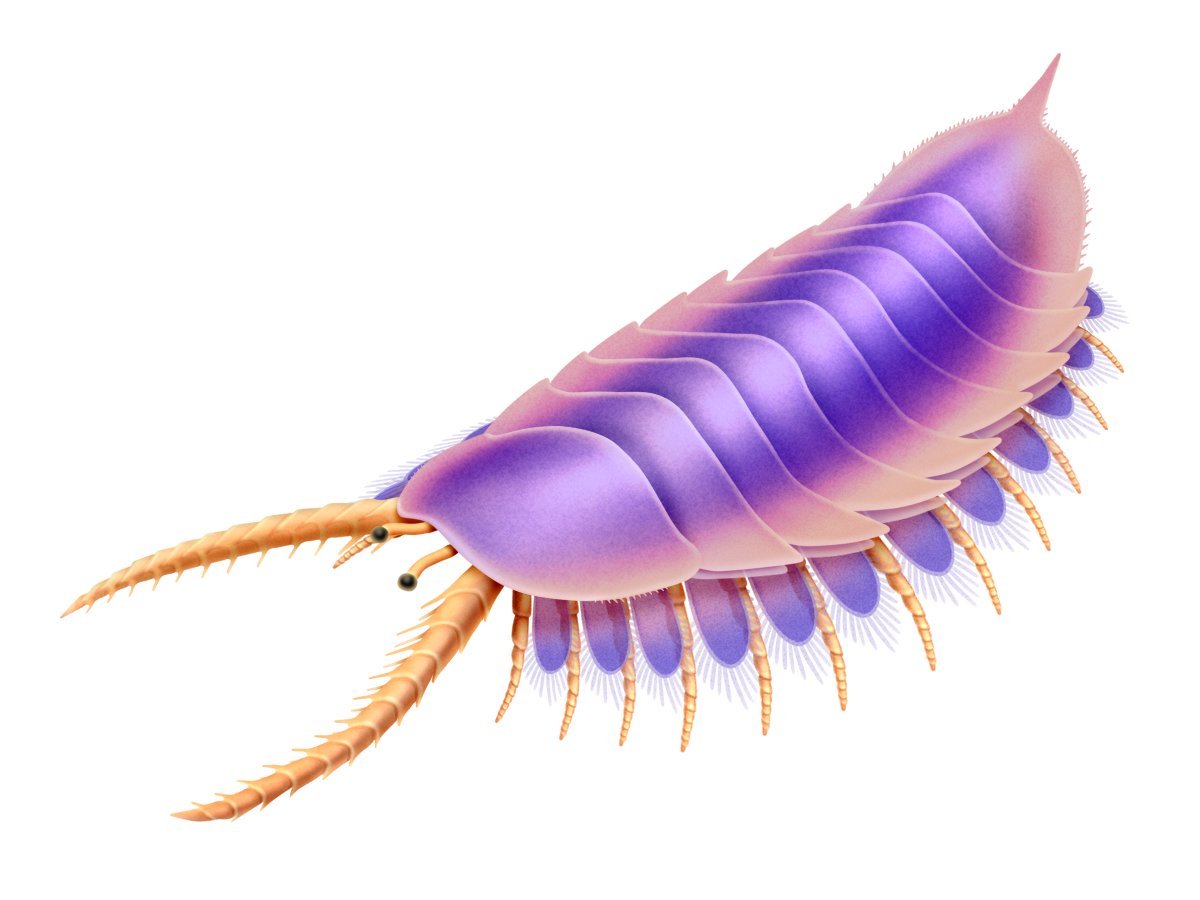
Reconstruction of Bushizheia yangi

The body of Bushizheia consisted of a simple head shield, 8 trunk segments (tergites) and a tail plate. In outward appearance the body is almost elliptical, about twice as long as wide, with the widest point in the front third of the body at the 3rd tergite.

The head plate was simple, convex in shape, wider than long, and represented about 25% of the total body length. The tergites were short, about five times as wide as long, and the rear edge of each tergite overlapped the following by about a fifth of its length. The tergites 1–5 all had about the same width, the following tergites becoming narrower towards the posterior end of the animal. At the lateral ends of each tergite existed spines which increased in length towards the tail. The tail was semi-circular, about half as long as wide, and had a spine extending from its back area.

The first segment bore a ventral pair of large appendages, which are about one third as long as the body. They consisted of a cylindrical stem and about 15 segments. The segments had a flat outer side and paired spines.

Nearly the entirety of the other limbs are currently unknown, as the singular specimen mostly preserves the dorsal part of the animal, however the missing limbs were probably similar to the limbs of Kiisortoqia.

== Ecology ==
Bushizheia is believed to have had a similar ecology to Kiisortoqia, being a predatory swimmer.

== Etymology ==
The name of the genus is derived from the Mandarin word bǔshízhě (捕食者), meaning "predator" or "hunter", in allusion to Kiisortoqia. The specific epithet is in honor of Zhixin Yang, who recovered and prepared the fossil.

== Distribution ==
Three specimens have been found in the Maotianshan Lagerstätte, specifically in the Eoredlichia – Wutingaspis trilobite biozone.

== Classification ==
Along with its only confirmed relative, Kiisortoqia, Bushizheia is currently classed as Euarthropoda incertae sedis, occasionally classed in or close to Artiopoda.

Cladogram after O’Flynn et al., 2023:

- Total group Arthropoda
  - "Gilled lobopodians" (Pambdelurion, Kerygmachela)
  - - Opabinia
    - - Radiodonta (e.g Anomalocaris)
      - Deuteropoda
        - - Kylinxia
          - Fengzhengia
        - - - Kiisortoqia
            - Bushizheia
          - - Megacheira
            - - Habeliida
              - - Mollisonia
                - Chelicerata (horseshoe crabs, sea spiders, arachnids, etc)
          - - - "Great appendage bivalved forms" (Occacaris, Forfexicaris)
              - Isoxyida
            - - Artiopoda (including Trilobita)
              - Mandibulata
                - Fuxianhuiida
                - - Myriapoda (millipedes, centipedes, etc)
                  - - Hymenocarina
                    - Pancrustacea (crustaceans, insects, etc)
