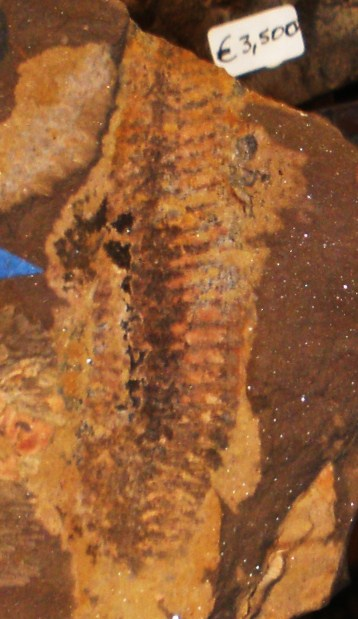
- Myoscolex ateles

Scientific classification
- Kingdom: Animalia
- Phylum: incertae sedis
- Genus: †Myoscolex

Type species
- †Myoscolex ateles Glaessner, 1979

= Myoscolex =

Myoscolex Temporal range: 517 Ma Early Cambrian

Extinct genus of worms

Myoscolex is an early animal known from the Cambrian Emu Bay Shale in South Australia. It is of unknown affinity but has been interpreted as an annelid and as an arthropod close to Opabinia. Myoscolex is the earliest known example of phosphotized muscle tissue, and as to which shows distinct annulation.

Myoscolex ateles was named by Glaessner in 1979.

== Etymology ==
Myoscolex ateles derives its name from Greek, "Myo-" meaning muscle, "Scolex" meaning worm, and "Ateles" meaning incomplete. This definition of "Incomplete muscle worm" is due to its initial identification as a "muscular" annelid worm with indistinct features after fossilization.

== Description ==
=== As an opabiniid ===
When described as an opabiniid, Myoscolex is said to have at least 3 eyes, a thin proboscis jutting from under the proposed eyes, lateral lobes on the trunk, a tail fan on the posterior segments, and an upwardly curving trunk. It would have lived as a fast nektonic carnivore. However, in 2022, a new opabiniid Utaurora was described, and Myoscolex is now considered an animal with an unknown affinity.

=== As a polychaete ===
Myoscolex as a polychaete worm possessed a laterally flattened body with "rods" protruding from the ventral side. Movement would have been an undulation similar to that of Pikaia without the use of chaetae for propulsion, unlike other polychaetes.

== Preservation ==
Myoscolex was preserved laterally compressed and in 4 layers. The outer two layers are composed of calcium carbonate and represents the skin, rods, lateral lobes, and possibly eyes and proboscis. The inner two layers were the internal muscles mineralized in apatite with resounding detail.
