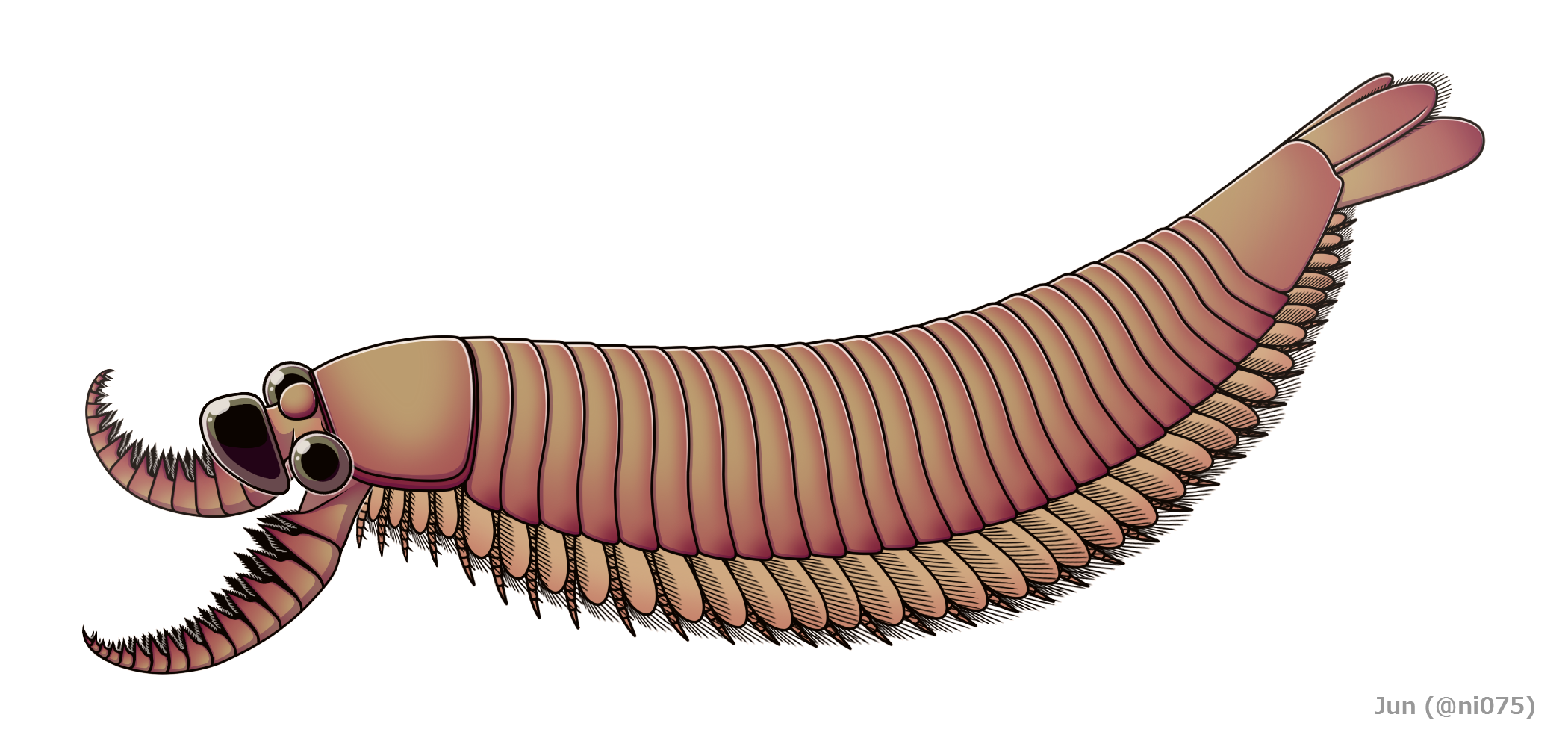

Scientific classification
- Kingdom: Animalia
- Phylum: Arthropoda
- (unranked): Deuteropoda
- Genus: †Kylinxia; Zeng et al., 2020
- Species: †K. zhangi

Binomial name
- †Kylinxia zhangi Zheng et al. 2020

= Kylinxia =

Kylinxia Temporal range: 518 Ma

Genus of fossil arthropod

Kylinxia is a genus of extinct arthropod described in 2020. It was described from six specimens discovered in Yu'anshan Formation (Maotianshan Shales) in southern China. The specimens are assigned to one species Kylinxia zhangi. Dated to 518 million years, the fossils falls under the Cambrian period. Announcing the discovery on 4 November 2020 at a press conference, Zeng Han of the Nanjing Institute of Geology and Paleontology, said that the animal "bridges the evolutionary gap from Anomalocaris to true arthropods and forms a key ‘missing link’ in the origin of arthropods," which was "predicted by Darwin’s evolutionary theory." The same day the formal description was published in Nature.

== Discovery ==
Kylinxia zhangi was discovered among the Maotianshan Shales from Yu'anshan Formation at Yunnan in southern China in 2019. Zeng Han, Zhao Fangchen, and Huang Diying of the Nanjing Institute of Geology and Palaeontology, Chinese Academy of Sciences, made the formal description and taxonomy in Nature in 2020. They found six specimens which are well preserved and complete. The original specimens (holotype) is kept at the Nanjing Institute of Geology and Palaeontology, while the additional specimens (paratypes) are maintained at the Yingliang Stone Natural History Museum.

=== Etymology ===
The genus name Kylinxia refers to a mixture of arthropod characters; kylin (qilin) is derived from the chimeric creature in Chinese mythology, while xia (蝦) is a Chinese word for shrimp-like arthropod. The species name zhang is after Yehui Zhang who contributed the additional specimens (paratypes).

== Description ==
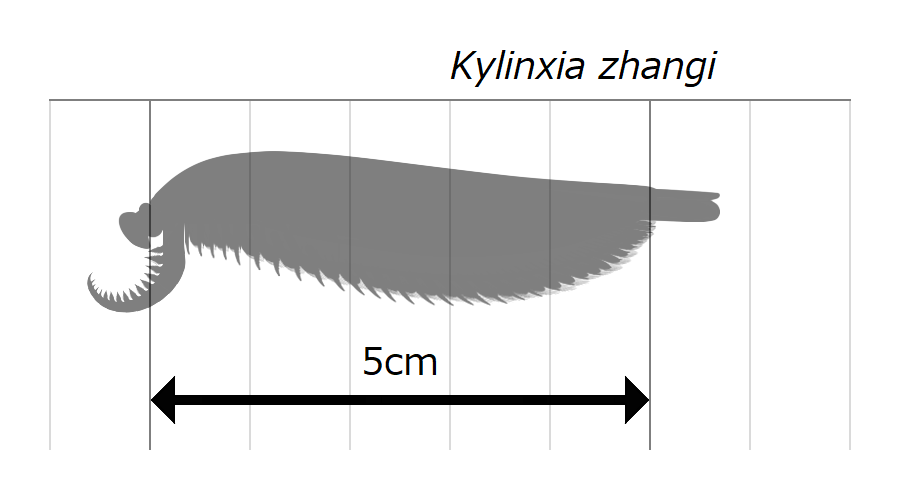
Size chart

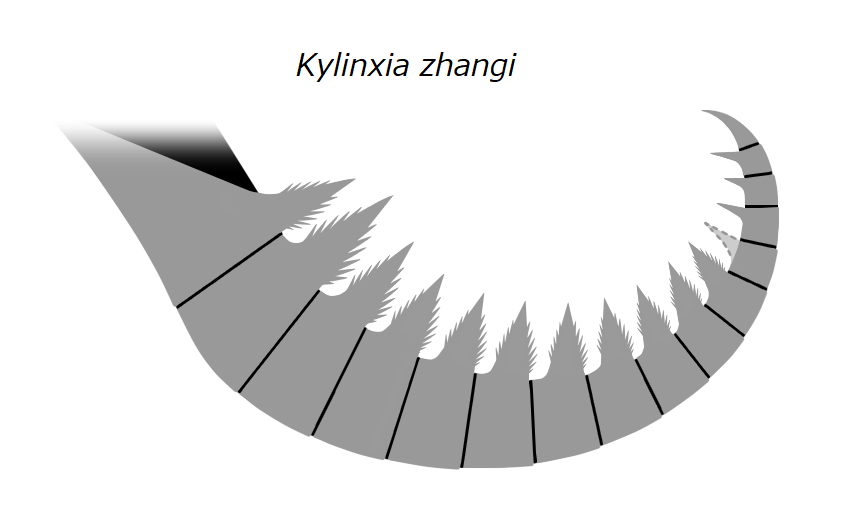
Frontalmost appendage of Kylinxia zhangi

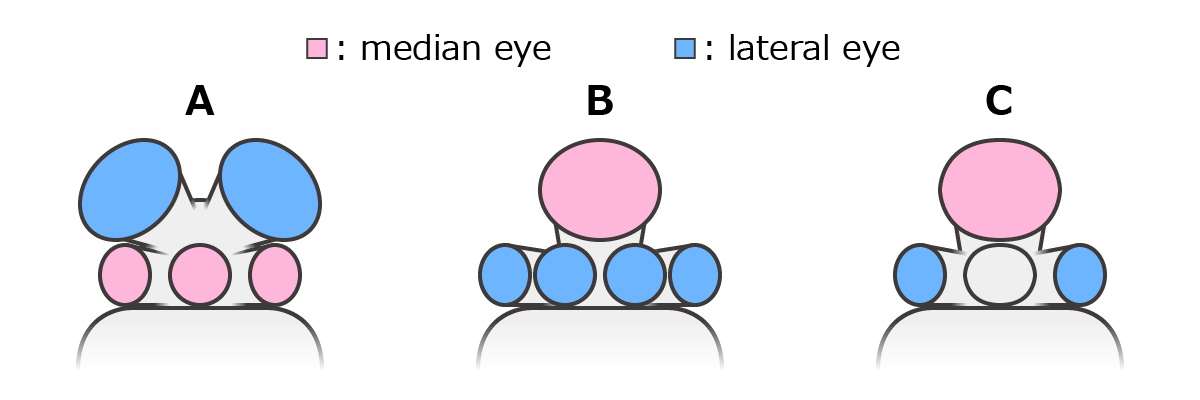
Various interpretations of eye placement of Kylinxia. A: 1 pair of large lateral eyes, 3 small median eyes after Zeng et al. (2020) B: 2 pairs of small lateral eyes, single large median eye after Moysiuk and Caron (2022) C: 1 pair of small lateral eyes, single large median eye, anterior sclerite present, after O’Flynn et al. (2023)

Kylinxia is a tiny shrimp-like arthropod, measuring about 5 centimetres (2.0 in) long and about 1.2 cm (0.47 in) broad at the widest part of the body. Its body is segmented and divisible into three regions, namely head, trunk and the pygidium. In the original description, Kylinxia was considered to possesses a mixture of characters resembling various Cambrian arthropod taxa, notably Opabinia (eyes), radiodonts (frontalmost appendages) and megacheirans (trunk).

The head of Kylinxia covered by a fused carapace with rounded genal corner comparable to those of the megacheiran Haikoucaris. Similar to the purported basal arthropod Opabinia, the head was initially suggested to have borne five eyes that were attached through eye stalks, however a later 2023 study suggested that there were only three eyes, one central medial eye and two lateral eyes. In contrast to the fused proboscis of Opabinia and the hand-like great appendages of megacheirans, the head region of Kylinxia has a pair of unfused, 16-jointed frontalmost appendages each of which has terminal and paired, serrated inner spines (endites), similar to those seen in the radiodont genera Anomalocaris (overall proportion) and Ramskoeldia (endites). Unlike radiodonts, the frontalmost appendages face upward and lack outer spines, which is a feature shared by the great appendages of megacheirans.

Similar to the multisegmented megacheirans, the trunk of Kylinxia covers most of the body length and is composed of up to 26 metameric segments (tergites) each corresponded to a pair of appendages. Within the post-oral appendages, the anteriormost 4 pairs are considered as reduced flap-like structures which arose from the head and two anterior trunk segments, later 2023 study considered these are two-branched (biramous) and all from head. The remaining appendages are all biramous, with the leg-like inner branches (endopod) each composed of at least seven segments and the suboval outer branches (exopods) each possess marginal lamellae. The triangular pygidium covers at least 5 pairs of appendages, terminated with a three-lobed tail fan consisting of a middle and a pair of lateral lobes as seen in several Cambrian arthropods such as hymenocarine and fuxianhuiids.

== Taxonomy ==
Kylinxia has generally been placed as one of the most basal members of Deuteropoda. A close relationship with the genus Fengzhengia has been proposed. Cladogram after O’Flynn et al, 2023:

- Total group Arthropoda
  - "Gilled lobopodians" (Pambdelurion, Kerygmachela)
  - - Opabinia
    - - Radiodonta (e.g Anomalocaris)
      - Deuteropoda
        - - Kylinxia
          - Fengzhengia
        - - - Kiisortoqia
            - Bushizheia
          - - Megacheira
            - - Habeliida
              - - Mollisonia
                - Chelicerata (horseshoe crabs, sea spiders, arachnids, etc)
          - - - "Great appendage bivalved forms" (Occacaris, Forfexicaris)
              - Isoxyida
            - - Artiopoda (including Trilobita)
              - Mandibulata
                - Fuxianhuiida
                - - Myriapoda (millipedes, centipedes, etc)
                  - - Hymenocarina
                    - Pancrustacea (crustaceans, insects, etc)

Cladogram after Liu et al; 2026:

- Panarthropoda
  - † "Lobopodia" (paraphyletic, ancestral to tardigrades, onychophorans and arthropods)
  - Total group Euarthropoda
    - †Megadictyon
    - - - †Kerygmachela
        - - †Pambdelurion
          - - †Opabiniidae
            - - † Radiodonta (e.g Anomalocaris)
              - Deuteropoda
                - †Erratus
                - - †Sunella
                  - - †Isoxyidae + "Great appendage bivalved forms"
                    - - - †Fengzhengia
                        - †Kylinxia
                      - - †Megacheira
                        - Pan-Chelicerata
                      - - †Kiisortoqia
                        - †Bushizheia
                        - Antennulata
                          - †Artiopoda (including Trilobita)
                          - Mandibulata
                            - †Fuxianhuiida
                            - - †Hymenocarina
                              - - Myriapoda
                                - Pancrustacea

== See also ==
- Erratus – Another taxon proposed to be transitional between radiodonts and euarthropods
