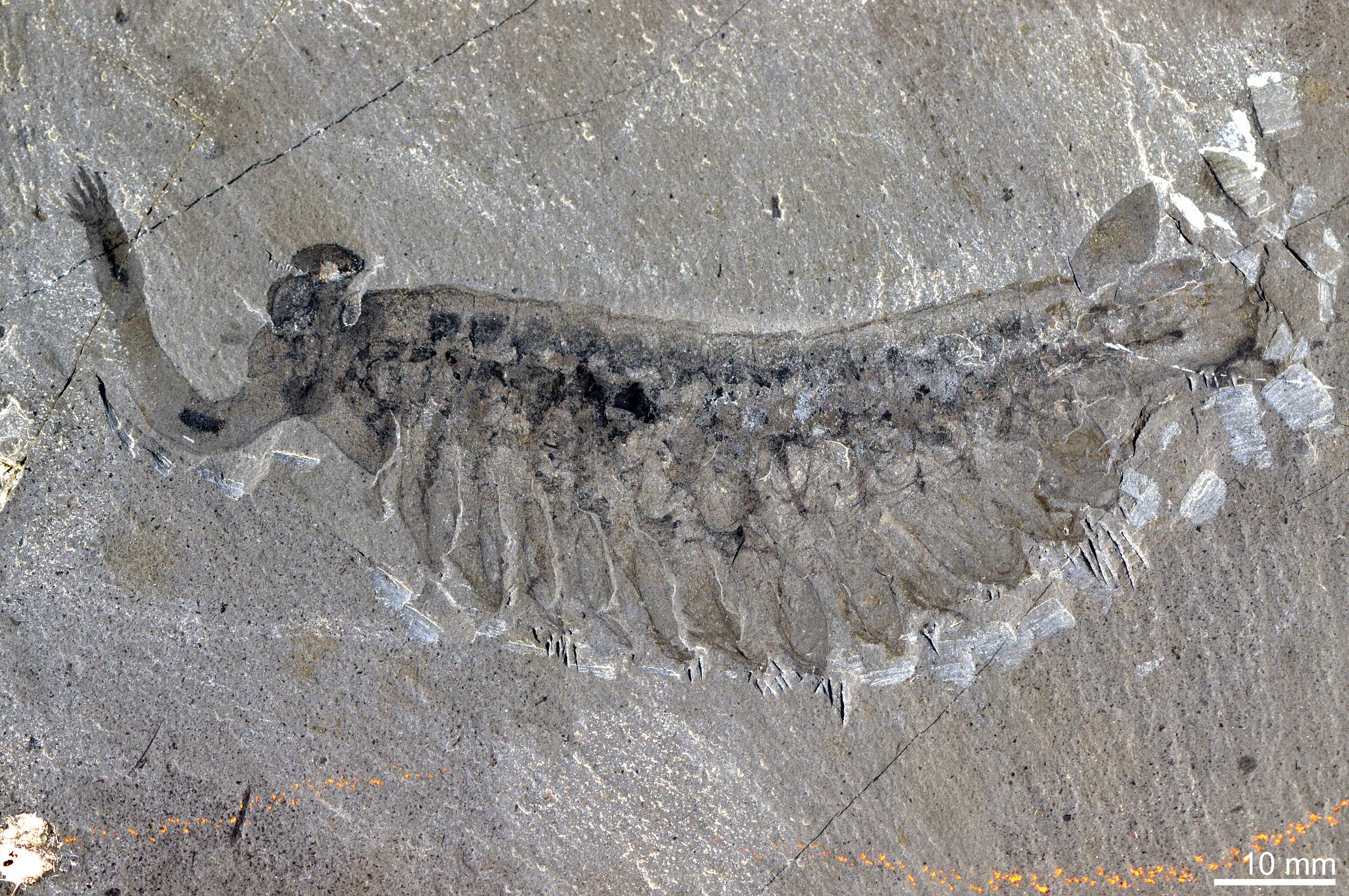
- Fossil specimen (holotype) on display at the Smithsonian in Washington, D.C.

Scientific classification
- Kingdom: Animalia
- Stem group: Arthropoda
- Class: †Dinocaridida
- Order: †Opabiniida
- Family: †Opabiniidae
- Genus: †Opabinia; Walcott, 1912
- Species: †O. regalis

Binomial name
- †Opabinia regalis Walcott, 1912

= Opabinia =

Opabinia Temporal range: Middle Cambrian (Wuliuan), 505 Ma

Extinct stem-arthropod species found in Cambrian fossil deposits

Opabinia regalis is an extinct stem group marine arthropod found in the Lagerstätte of the Burgess Shale (Middle Cambrian, 505 million years ago) of British Columbia. Opabinia was a soft-bodied animal, measuring up to 7 cm in body length, and had a segmented trunk with flaps along its sides and a fan-shaped tail. The head showed unusual features: 5 eyes, a mouth under the head and facing backwards, and a clawed proboscis that most likely passed food to its mouth. Opabinia lived on the seafloor, using the proboscis to seek out small, soft food. Fewer than twenty good specimens have been described; 3 specimens of Opabinia are known from the Greater Phyllopod bed, where they constitute less than 0.1% of the community.

When the first thorough examination of Opabinia in 1975 revealed its unusual features, it was thought to be unrelated to any known phylum, or perhaps a relative of arthropod and annelid ancestors. However, later studies since late 1990s consistently support its affinity as a member of basal arthropods, alongside the closely related radiodonts (Anomalocaris and relatives) and gilled lobopodians (Kerygmachela and Pambdelurion).

In the 1970s, there was an ongoing debate about whether multi-celled animals appeared suddenly during the Early Cambrian, in an event called the Cambrian explosion, or had arisen earlier but without leaving fossils. At first Opabinia was regarded as strong evidence for the "explosive" hypothesis. Later the discovery of a whole series of similar lobopodian animals, some with closer resemblances to arthropods, and the development of the idea of stem groups, suggested that the Early Cambrian was a time of relatively fast evolution, but one that could be understood without assuming any unique evolutionary processes.

== History of discovery ==
In 1911, Charles Doolittle Walcott found in the Burgess Shale nine almost complete fossils of Opabinia regalis and a few of what he classified as Opabinia ? media, and published a description of all of these in 1912. The generic name is derived from Opabin pass between Mount Hungabee and Mount Biddle, southeast of Lake O'Hara, British Columbia, Canada. In 1966–1967, Harry B. Whittington found another good specimen, and in 1975 he published a detailed description based on a very thorough dissection of some specimens and photographs of these specimens lit from a variety of angles. Whittington's analysis did not cover Opabinia ? media; Walcott's specimens of this species could not be identified in his collection. In 1960 Russian paleontologists described specimens they found in the Norilsk region of Siberia and labelled Opabinia norilica, but these fossils were poorly preserved, and Whittington did not feel they provided enough information to be classified as members of the genus Opabinia.

== Occurrence ==
All the recognized Opabinia specimens found so far come from the "Phyllopod bed" of the Burgess Shale, in the Canadian Rockies of British Columbia.

In 1997, Briggs and Nedin reported from Emu Bay Shale in South Australia a new specimen of Myoscolex that was much better preserved than previous specimens, leading them to conclude that it was a close relative of Opabinia—although this interpretation was later questioned by Dzik, who instead concluded that Myoscolex was an unusual annelid worm similar to Pikaia.

== Morphology ==
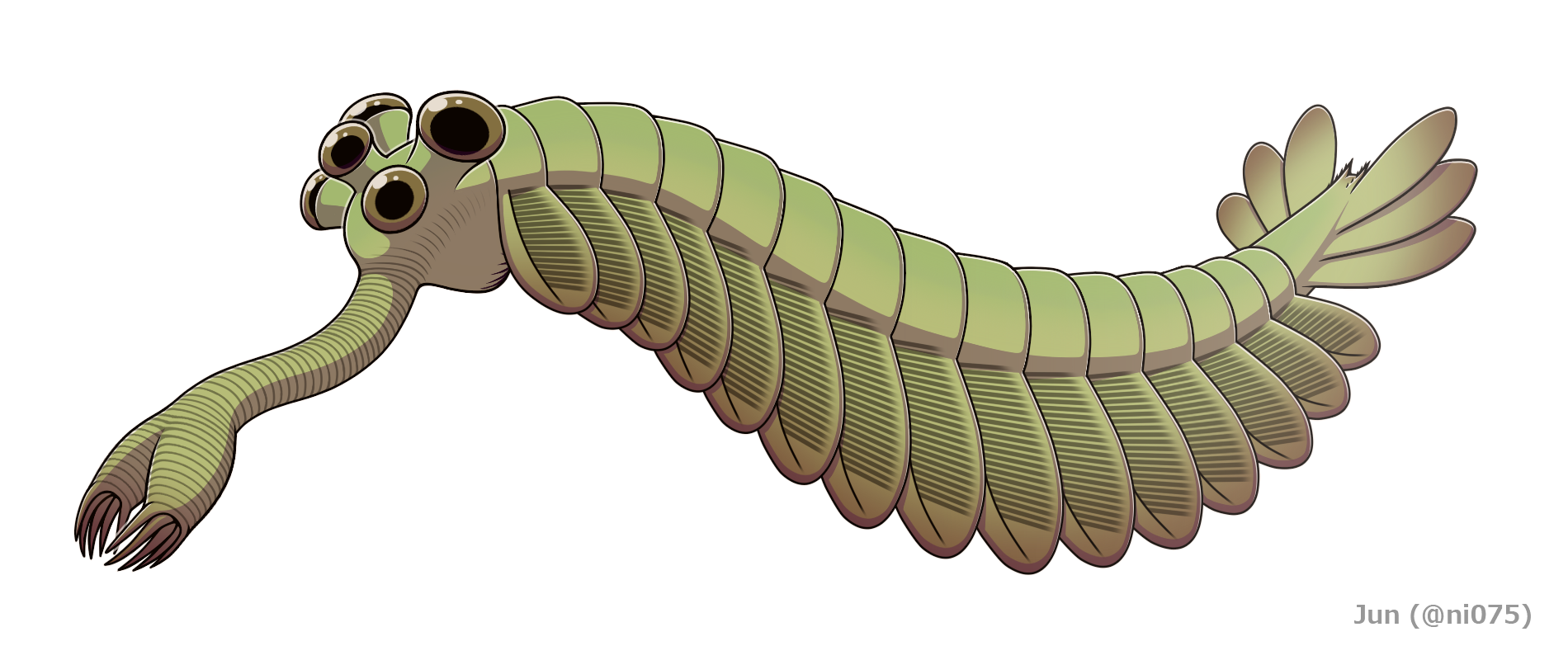
Restoration

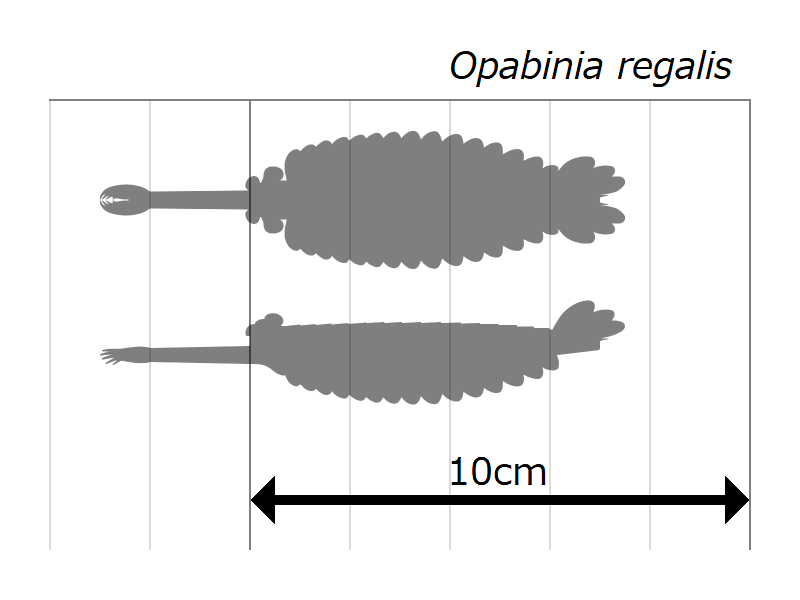
Size estimation

Opabinia looked so strange that the audience at the first presentation of Whittington's analysis laughed. The length of Opabinia regalis from head (excluding proboscis) to tail end ranged between 4 centimetres (1.6 in) and 7 centimetres (2.8 in). One of the most distinctive characters of Opabinia is the hollow proboscis, whose total length was about one-third that of the body, and projected down from under the head. The proboscis was striated like a vacuum cleaner's hose and flexible, and it ended with a claw-like structure whose terminal edges bore 5 spines that projected inwards and forwards. The bilateral symmetry and lateral (instead of vertical, as reconstructed by Whittington 1975) arrangement of the claw suggest it represents a pair of fused frontal appendages, comparable to those of radiodonts and gilled lobopodians. The head bore five stalked eyes: two near the front and fairly close to the middle of the head, pointing upwards and forwards; two larger eyes with longer stalks near the rear and outer edges of the head, pointing upwards and sideways; and a single eye between the larger pair of stalked eyes, pointing upwards. It has been assumed that the eyes were all compound, like other arthropods' lateral eyes, but this reconstruction, which is not backed up by any evidence, is "somewhat fanciful". The mouth was under the head, behind the proboscis, and pointed backwards, so that the digestive tract formed a U-bend on its way towards the rear of the animal. The proboscis appears to have been sufficiently long and flexible to reach the mouth.

The main part of the body was typically about 5 millimetres (0.20 in) wide and had 15 segments, on each of which there were pairs of flaps (lobes) pointing downwards and outwards. The flaps overlapped so that the front of each was covered by the rear edge of the one ahead of it. The body ended with what looked like a single conical segment bearing three pairs of overlapping tail fan blades that pointed up and out, forming a tail like a V-shaped double fan.

Interpretations of other features of Opabinia fossils differ. Since the animals did not have mineralized armor nor even tough organic exoskeletons like those of other arthropods, their bodies were flattened as they were buried and fossilized, and smaller or internal features appear as markings within the outlines of the fossils.

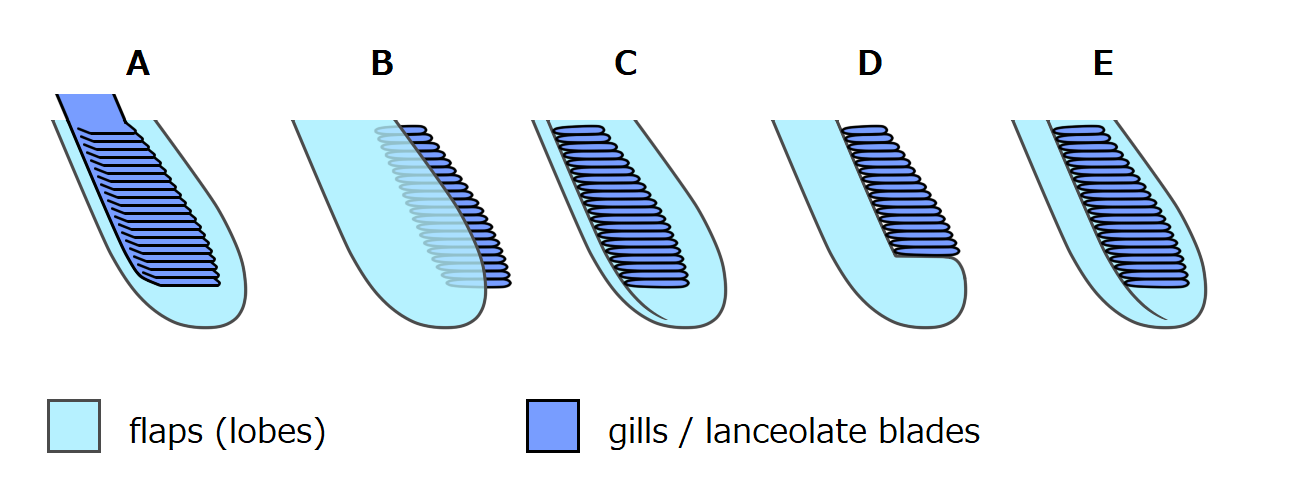
Various interpretations on the flap and gill structures of Opabinia regalis
A: Whittington (1975), B: Bergström (1986), C: Budd (1996), D: Zhang & Briggs (2007), E: Budd & Daley (2011)

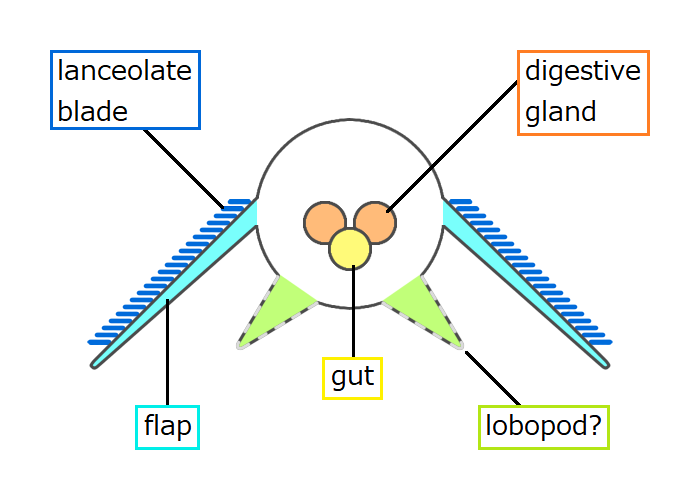
Opabinia cross-section based on Budd and Daley (2011)

Whittington (1975) interpreted the gills as paired extensions attached dorsally to the bases of all but the first flaps on each side, and thought that these gills were flat underneath, had overlapping layers on top. Bergström (1986) revealed that the "overlapping layers" were rows of individual blades, interpreted the flaps as part of dorsal coverings (tergite) over the upper surface of the body, with blades attached underneath each of them. Budd (1996) thought the gill blades attached along the front edges on the dorsal side of all except the first flaps. He also found marks inside the flaps' front edges that he interpreted as internal channels connecting the gills to the interior of the body, much as Whittington interpreted the mark along the proboscis as an internal channel. Zhang and Briggs (2007), however, interpreted all flaps have posterior spacing where the gill blades attached. Budd and Daley (2011) reject the reconstruction by Zhang & Briggs, showing the flaps have complete posterior edges as in previous reconstructions. They mostly follow the reconstruction by Budd (1996) with modifications on some details (e.g., the first flap pair also has gills; the attachment point of gill blades is located more posteriorly than previously thought).

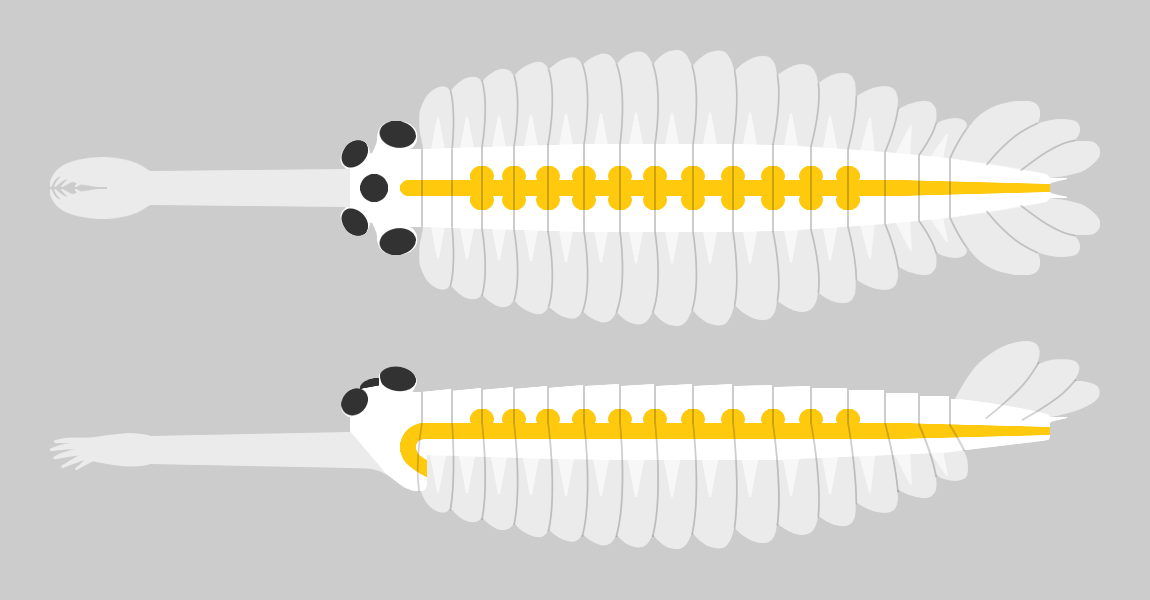
Digestive system (yellow highlight) of Opabinia, showing pairs of diverticula individualized from the triangular extension

Whittington (1975) found evidence of near-triangular features along the body and concluded that they were internal structures, most likely sideways extensions of the gut (diverticula). Chen et al. (1994) interpreted them as contained within the lobes along the sides. Budd (1996) thought the "triangles" were too wide to fit within Opabinia's slender body, and that cross-section views showed they were attached separately from and lower than the lobes, and extended below the body. He later found specimens that appeared to preserve the legs' exterior cuticle. He therefore interpreted the "triangles" as short, fleshy, conical legs (lobopods). He also found small mineralized patches at the tips of some and interpreted these as claws. Under this reconstruction, the gill-bearing flap and lobopod were homologized to the outer gill branch and inner leg branch of arthropod biramous limbs seen in Marrella, trilobites, and crustaceans. Zhang and Briggs (2007) analyzed the chemical composition of the "triangles", and concluded that they had the same composition as the gut, and therefore agreed with Whittington that they were part of the digestive system. Instead, they regarded Opabinia's lobe+gill arrangement as an early form of the arthropod limbs before it split into a biramous structure. However, this similar chemical composition is not only associated with the digestive tract; Budd and Daley (2011) suggest that it represents mineralization forming within fluid-filled cavities within the body, which is consistent with hollow lobopods as seen in unequivocal lobopodian fossils. They also clarify that the gut diverticula of Opabinia are a series of circular gut glands individualized from the "triangles". While they agreed on the absence of terminal claws, the presence of lobopods in Opabinia remains as a plausible interpretation.

== Lifestyle ==
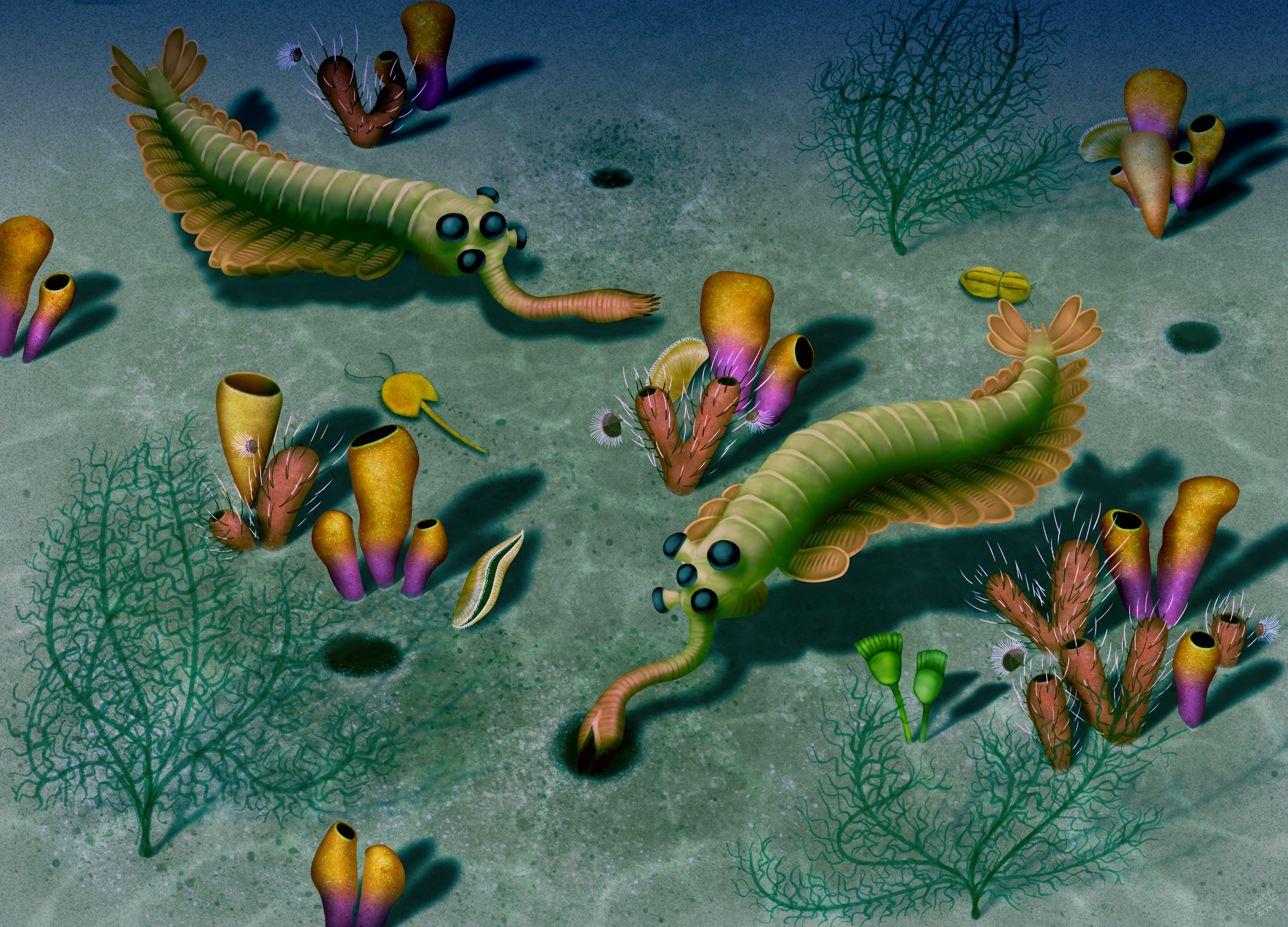
Ecological reconstruction of Opabinia on the seafloor along with other fauna from the Burgess Shale

Suggested proboscis mobility of Opabinia

The way in which the Burgess Shale animals were buried, by a mudslide or a sediment-laden current that acted as a sandstorm, suggests they lived on the surface of the seafloor. Opabinia probably used its proboscis to search the sediment for food particles and pass them to its mouth. Since there is no sign of anything that might function as jaws, its food was presumably small and soft. The paired gut diverticula may increase the efficiency of food digestion and intake of nutrition. Whittington (1975), believing that Opabinia had no legs, thought that it crawled on its lobes and that it could also have swum slowly by flapping the lobes, especially if it timed the movements to create a wave with the metachronal movement of its lobes. On the other hand, he thought the body was not flexible enough to allow fish-like undulations of the whole body.

== Classification ==
- Ecdysozoa
  - Cycloneuralia
    Priapulida and relatives
  - Panarthropoda
    - Onychophora
    - Tardigrada
    - †
      Lobopodian grade
    - - †
        Pambdelurion
      - †
        Kerygmachela
      - - †
          Opabinia
        - †
          Utaurora
        - †
          Radiodonta
        - Euarthropoda

Summarized phylogeny between Opabinia and other Ecdysozoan taxa.

Considering how paleontologists' reconstructions of Opabinia differ, it is not surprising that the animal's classification was highly debated during the 20th century. Charles Doolittle Walcott, the original describer, considered it to be an anostracan crustacean in 1912. The idea was followed by G. Evelyn Hutchinson in 1930, providing the first reconstruction of Opabinia as an anostracan swimming upside down. Alberto Simonetta provided a new reconstruction of Opabinia in 1970 very different to those of Hutchinson's, with lots of arthropod features (e.g., dorsal exoskeleton and jointed limbs) which are reminiscent of Yohoia and Leanchoilia. Leif Størmer, following earlier work by Percy Raymond, thought that Opabinia belonged to the so-called "trilobitoids" (trilobites and similar taxa). After his thorough analysis, Harry B. Whittington concluded that Opabinia was not an arthropod in 1975, as he found no evidence for arthropodan jointed limbs, and that nothing like the flexible, probably fluid-filled, proboscis was known in arthropods. Although he left Opabinia's classification above the family level open, the annulated but not articulated body and the unusual lateral flaps with gills persuaded him that it may have been a representative of the ancestral stock from the origin of annelids and arthropods, two distinct animal phyla (Lophotrochozoan and Ecdysozoan, respectively) which were still thought to be close relatives (united under Articulata) at that time.

In 1985, Derek Briggs and Whittington published a major redescription of Anomalocaris, also from the Burgess Shale. Soon after that, Swedish palaeontologist Jan Bergström, noting in 1986 the similarity of Anomalocaris and Opabinia, suggested that the two animals were related, as they shared numerous features (e.g., lateral flaps, gill blades, stalked eyes, and specialized frontal appendages). He classified them as primitive arthropods, although he considered that arthropods are not a single phylum.

In 1996, Graham Budd found what he considered evidence of short, un-jointed legs in Opabinia. His examination of the gilled lobopodian Kerygmachela from the Sirius Passet lagerstätte, about 518 million years ago and over 10M years older than the Burgess Shale, convinced him that this specimen had similar legs. He considered the legs of these two genera very similar to those of the Burgess Shale lobopodian Aysheaia and the modern onychophorans (velvet worms), which are regarded as the bearers of numerous ancestral traits shared by the ancestors of arthropods. After examining several sets of features shared by these and similar lobopodians he drew up a "broad-scale reconstruction of the arthropod stem-group", i.e., of arthropods and what he considered to be their evolutionary basal members. One striking feature of this family tree is that modern tardigrades (water bears) may be Opabinia's closest living evolutionary relatives. On the other hand, Hou et al. (1995, 2006) suggested Opabinia is a member of unusual cycloneuralian worms with convergent arthropod features.

Although Zhang and Briggs (2007) disagreed with Budd's diagnosis that Opabinia's "triangles" were legs, the resemblance they saw between Opabinia's lobe+gill arrangement and arthropods' biramous limbs led them to conclude that Opabinia was very closely related to arthropods. In fact, they presented a family tree very similar to Budd's except that theirs did not mention tardigrades. Regardless of the different morphological interpretations, all major restudies since the 1980s similarly concluded that the resemblance between Opabinia and arthropods (e.g., stalked eyes, dorsal segmentation, posterior mouth, fused appendages, gill-like limb branches) is taxonomically significant.

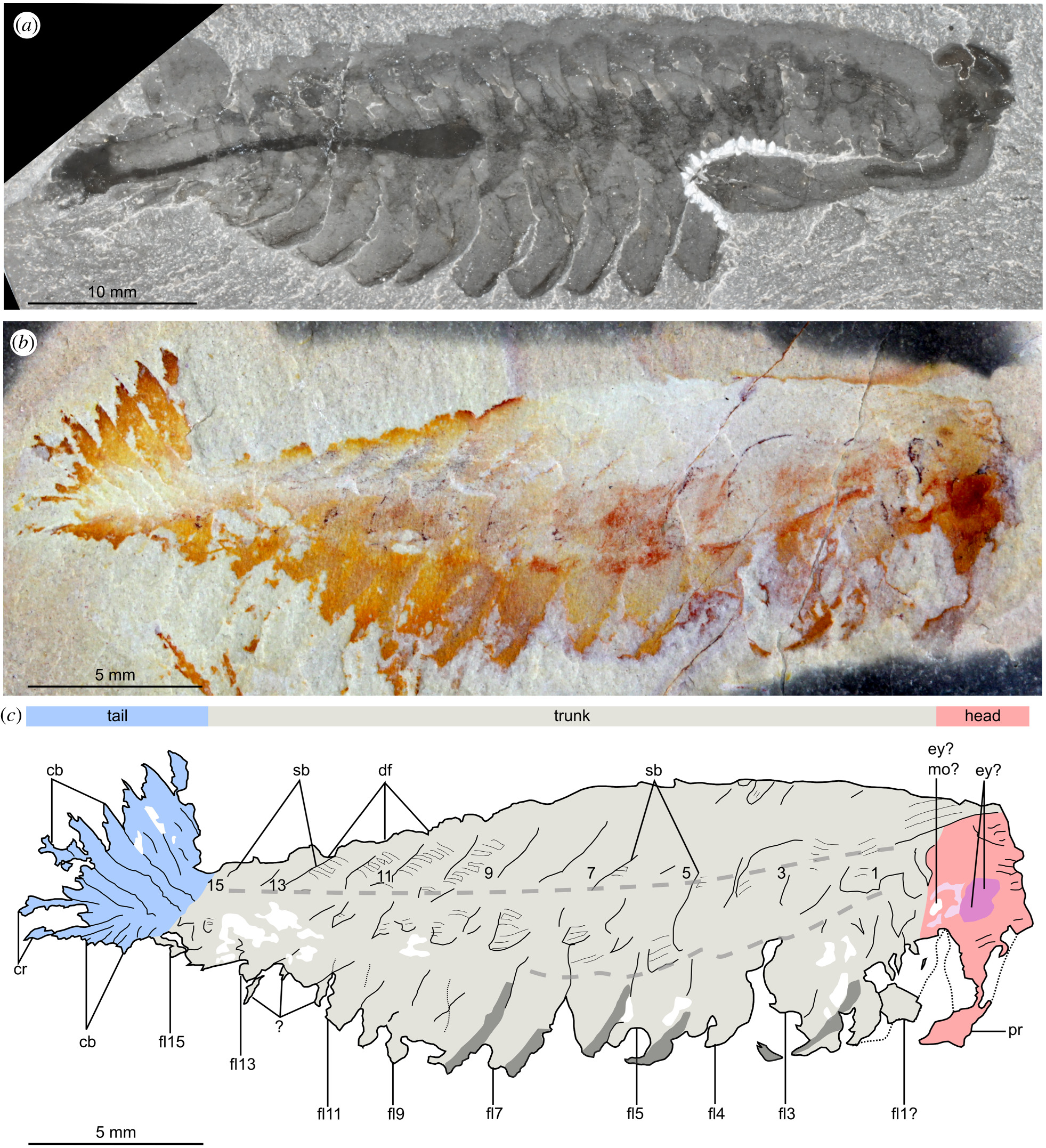
Comparison of Opabinia regalis from the Burgess Shale, and Utaurora comosa, from the Wheeler Formation, House Range, Utah, USA

Since the 2010s, the suggested close relationship between Opabinia and tardigrades/cycloneuralians is no longer supported, while the affinity of Opabinia as a stem-group arthropod alongside Radiodonta (a clade that includes Anomalocaris and its relatives) and gilled lobopodians is widely accepted, as consistently shown by multiple phylogenetic analyses, as well as new discoveries such as the presence of arthropod-like gut glands and the intermediate taxon Kylinxia.

In 2022, Paleontologists described a similar looking animal which was discovered in Cambrian-aged rocks of Utah. The fossil was named Utaurora comosa, and was found within the Wheeler Shale. The stem-arthropod was actually first described in 2008, but at the time it was originally considered a specimen of Anomalocaris. This discovery could suggest there were other animals that looked like Opabinia, and its family may have been more diverse.

== Theoretical significance ==
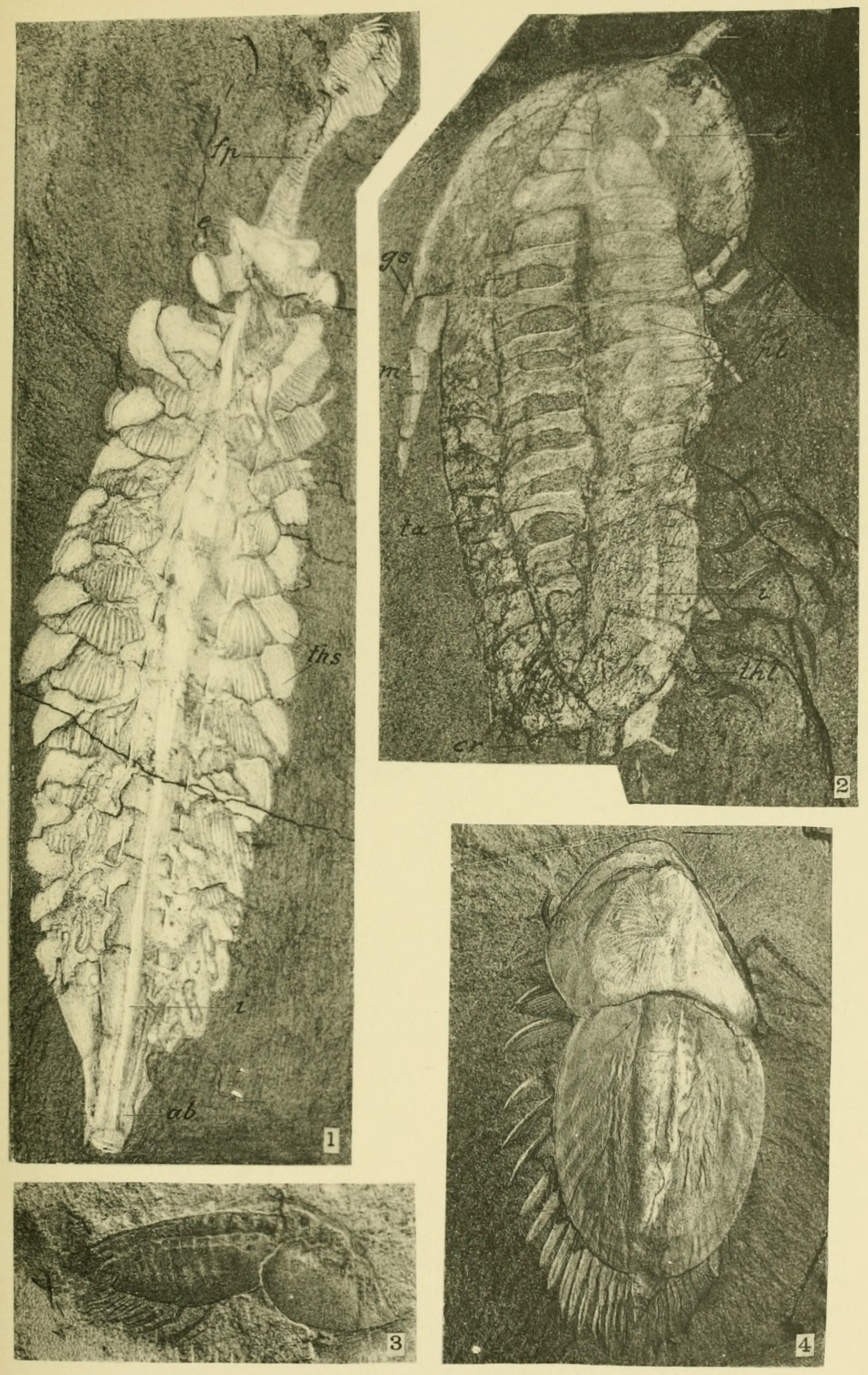
Top left: retouched image of Opabinia (Walcott Cambrian Geology and Paleontology II by Charles Doolittle Walcott)

Opabinia made it clear how little was known about soft-bodied animals, which do not usually leave fossils. When Whittington described it in the mid-1970s, there was already a vigorous debate about the early evolution of animals. Preston Cloud argued in 1948 and 1968 that the process was "explosive", and in the early 1970s Niles Eldredge and Stephen Jay Gould developed their theory of punctuated equilibrium, which views evolution as long intervals of near-stasis "punctuated" by short periods of rapid change. On the other hand, around the same time, Wyatt Durham and Martin Glaessner both argued that the animal kingdom had a long Proterozoic history that was hidden by the lack of fossils. Whittington (1975) concluded that Opabinia, and other taxa such as Marrella and Yohoia, cannot be accommodated in modern groups. This was one of the primary reasons why Gould in his book on the Burgess Shale, Wonderful Life, considered that Early Cambrian life was much more disparate and "experimental" than any later set of animals and that the Cambrian explosion was a truly dramatic event, possibly driven by unusual evolutionary mechanisms. He regarded Opabinia as so important to understanding this phenomenon that he wanted to call his book Homage to Opabinia.

However, other discoveries and analyses soon followed, revealing similar-looking animals such as Anomalocaris from the Burgess Shale and Kerygmachela from Sirius Passet. Another Burgess Shale animal, Aysheaia, was considered very similar to modern Onychophora, which are regarded as close relatives of arthropods. Paleontologists defined a group called lobopodians to include fossil panarthropods that are thought to be close relatives of onychophorans, tardigrades, and arthropods but lack jointed limbs. This group was later widely accepted as a paraphyletic grade that led to the origin of extant panarthropod phyla.

Concept of stem groups: — = Lines of descent; = Basal node; = Crown node; = Total group; = Crown group; = Stem group

While this discussion about specific fossils such as Opabinia and Anomalocaris was going on in the late 20th century, the concept of stem groups was introduced to cover evolutionary "aunts" and "cousins". A crown group is a group of closely related living animals plus their last common ancestor plus all its descendants. A stem group contains offshoots from members of the lineage earlier than the last common ancestor of the crown group; it is a relative concept, for example tardigrades are living animals that form a crown group in their own right, but Budd (1996) regarded them also as being a stem group relative to the arthropods. Viewing strange-looking organisms like Opabinia in this way makes it possible to see that, while the Cambrian explosion was unusual, it can be understood in terms of normal evolutionary processes.

== See also ==
- Body plan – Set of morphological features common to members of a phylum of animals
- Paleobiota of the Burgess Shale – Fossil flora and fauna of the Burgess Shale
