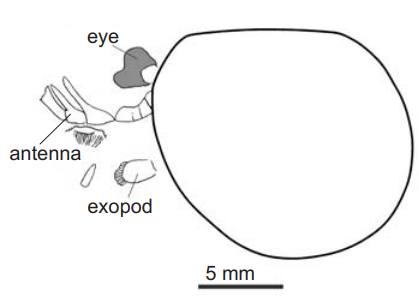
- Fossil drawing
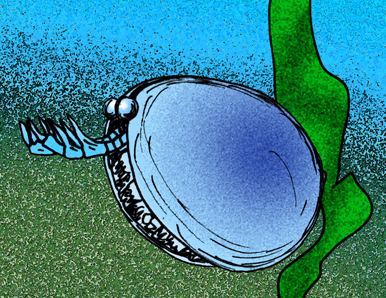
- Reconstruction

Scientific classification
- Kingdom: Animalia
- Phylum: Arthropoda
- Order: †Pectocaridida
- Family: †Forfexicarididae; Hou, 1999
- Genus: †Forfexicaris; Hou, 1999
- Species: †F. valida

Binomial name
- †Forfexicaris valida Hou, 1999

= Forfexicaris =

Forfexicaris Temporal range: Cambrian Stage 3

Extinct genus of arthropods

Forfexicaris valida is a species of Lower Cambrian arthropod, the only species in the family Forfexicarididae. It is known from only two specimens from the Maotianshan shale Lagerstätte.

== Description ==
F. valida had a bivalved carapace, like that seen in ostracod crustaceans, which was 15 millimetres (0.59 in) long and 13 mm (0.51 in) high. It had a pair of stalked eyes, and a pair of great appendages, which closely resemble those of Occacaris.
