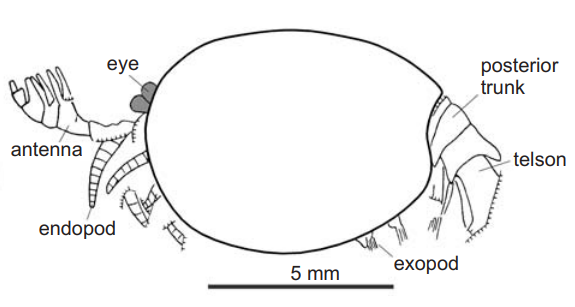
- Fossil drawing
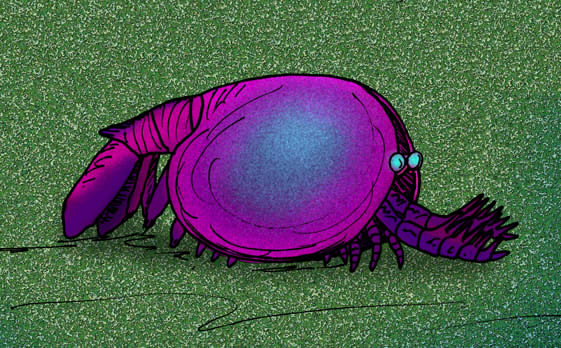
- Reconstruction

Scientific classification
- Kingdom: Animalia
- Phylum: Arthropoda
- Order: †Pectocaridida
- Family: †Occacarididae; Hou, 1999
- Genus: †Occacaris; Hou, 1999

Type species
- Occacaris oviformis Hou, 1999

Other species
- †Occacaris magnus (Yao, 2009); †Occacaris lazizhaiensis Wen et al., 2017

= Occacaris =

Occacaris Temporal range: Cambrian Stage 3–Mid Cambrian

Extinct genus of arthropods

Occacaris is an extinct nektonic predatory arthropod from the Lower Cambrian Maotianshan shale Lagerstätte, known from three species. It bears a superficial resemblance to the Cambrian arthropod, Canadaspis, though, was much smaller, and had a pair of "great appendages", with which it may have grasped prey. It was originally considered to belong to Megacheira, however it is questioned in later study.

It had a bivalved carapace that covered most of its body, leaving only the last two tergites of its trunk, with the telson jutting out of the posterior end of the carapace, and the eyes, antennae (possibly isolated endopod), and great appendages jutting out of the anterior end. The spines of the great appendages are paired, setting it apart from Forfexicaris valida and megacheirans like Fortiforceps foliosa. The "great appendages" were very similar to those of true megacheirans (as opposed to other arthropods that have upward curling frontal appendages like Isoxys), with a prominent "elbow", and elongate upward facing endite spines on the outermost segments.

Suggestions have been made that Occacaris is closely related to megacheirans, mandibulates, or as related to or even within the isoxyids within the arthropod stem-group.

== See also ==
- Arthropod
- Cambrian explosion
- Chengjiang biota
  - List of Chengjiang Biota species by phylum
