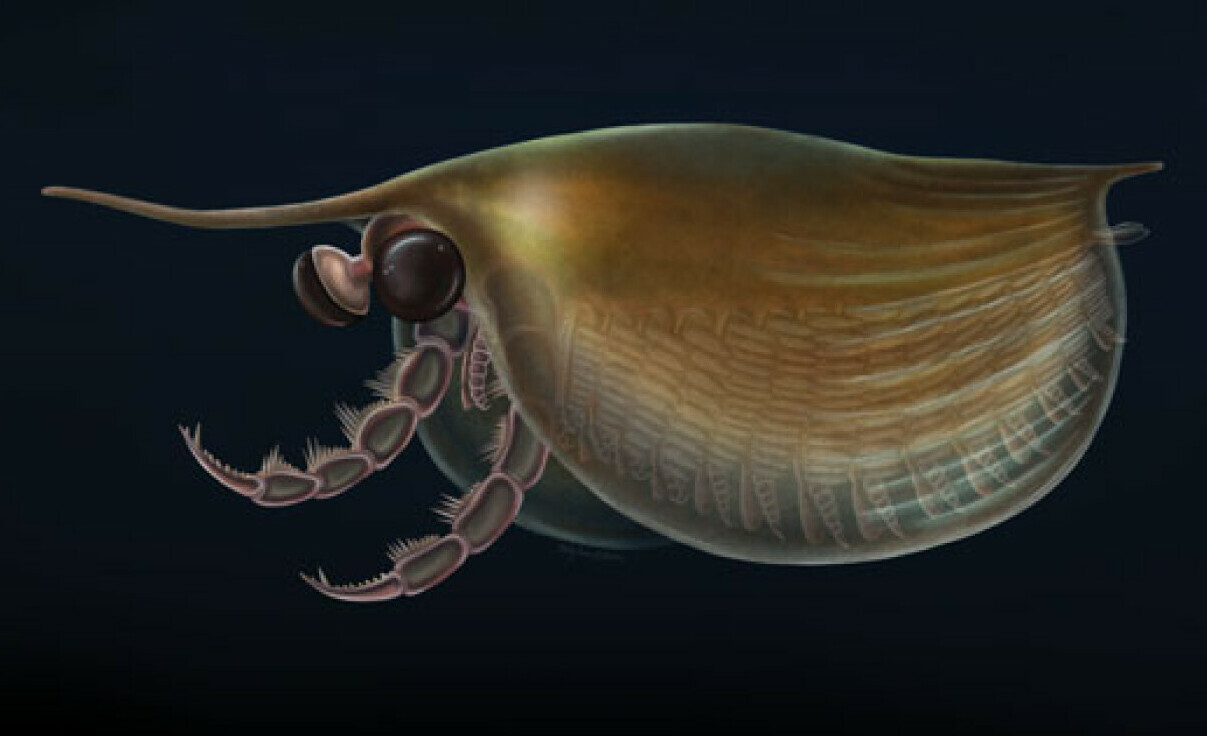
- Restoration of Isoxys curvirostratus
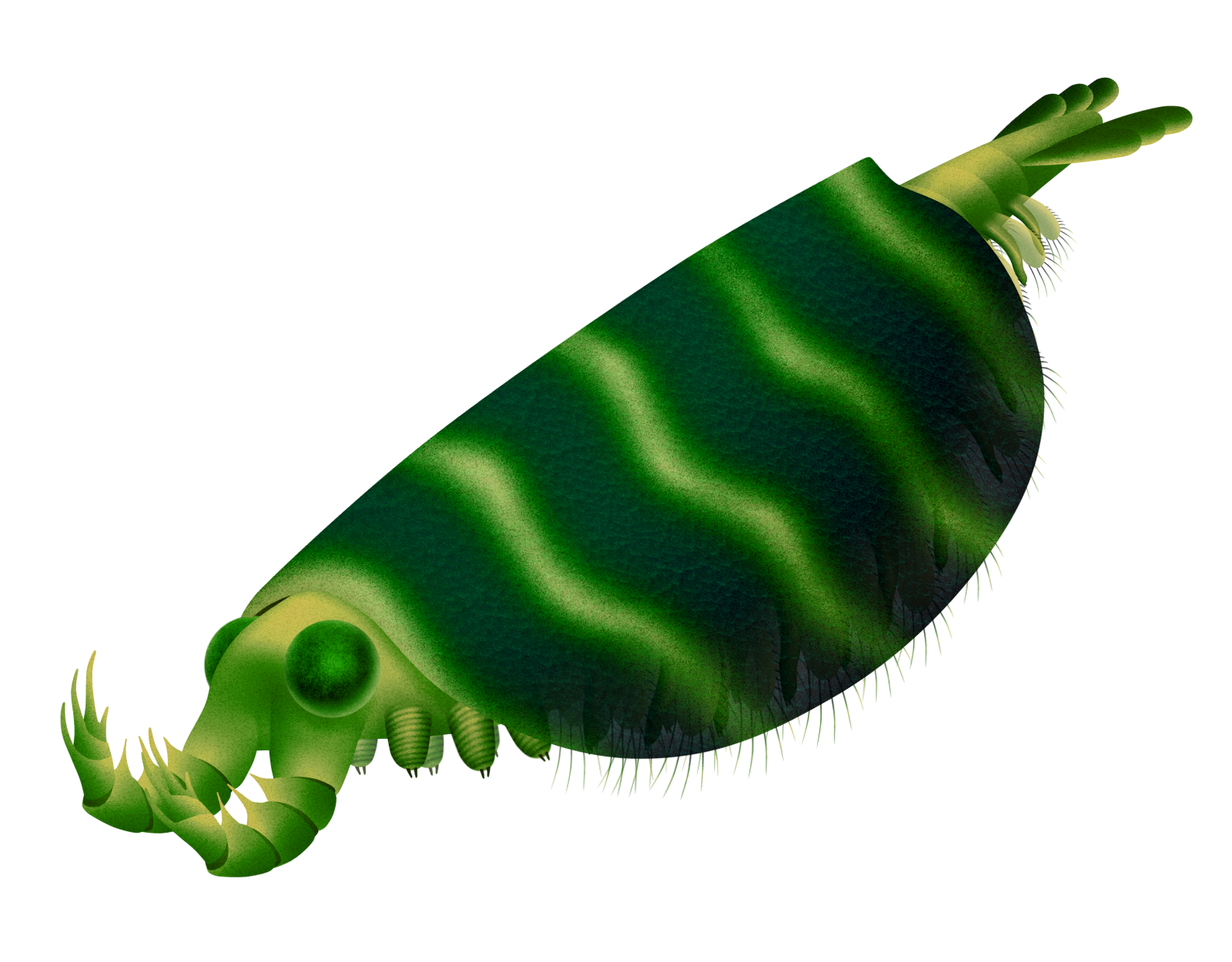
- Restoration of Surusicaris elegans

Scientific classification
- Kingdom: Animalia
- Phylum: Arthropoda
- Clade: Deuteropoda
- Order: †Isoxyida; Simonetta & Delle Cave, 1975

Subgroups
- †Isoxyidae Vogdes, 1893; †Isoxys; †Surusicaris; †Occacaris?; †Forfexicaris?; †Sunellidae?; †Caudicaella; †Combinivalvula; †Jinningella; †Sunella

= Isoxyida =

Isoxyida Temporal range: Cambrian Stage 3–Miaolingian

Extinct order of arthropods

Isoxyids are members of the order Isoxyida and the family Isoxyidae, a group of basal arthropods that existed during the Cambrian and possibly early Ordovician periods. Its best known members are Isoxys, with 20 species found worldwide, and Surusicaris, known from a single species found in the Burgess Shale of Canada. Isoxyida is also sometimes taken to include the family Sunellidae, which comprises four genera: Sunella, Combinivalvula, Jinningella and Caudicaella, all of which are known from deposits in China, with Caudicaella also known from the Heatherdale Shale of South Australia. Recent analysis has instead suggested that sunellids, despite their superficially similar appearance, are crustaceans and unrelated to isoxyids. Isoxys and Surusicaris are distinguished by their bivalved carapaces and pair of upward curving grasping frontal appendages. Sunellids also had bivalved carapaces, but unlike other isoxyids these were distinguished by the presence of an anterodorsal sulcus on their carapaces. These arthropods are thought to have been predators, hunting soft-bodied prey in either the water column, or close to the seabed.

== Description ==
Isoxys and Surusicaris have a combination of features seen in both stem-group arthropods, as well as more advanced taxa. They have semicircular bivalved carapaces, large, spherical eyes, a pair of large upward curling frontal appenages covered in spines, and pairs of biramous limbs running along the body. The trunk region appears to be unsegmented and lacks sclerotisation, similar to radiodonts, with a segmented and sclerotised (arthropodized) trunk being characteristic of most arthropods. On the other hand, sunellids are known mostly from carapaces and their fossils do not preserve frontal appendages similar to those of Isoxys, but some preserve soft tissue, including an apparently segmented trunk, trunk appendages, large, spherical eyes and a possible median eye. Their bivalved carapaces also have an anterodorsal sulcus, a character shared with bradoriids, another group of similar but unrelated arthropods. However, detailed analysis of the limb anatomy of Sunella published in mid-2026 found that it was a pancrustacean related to ostracods instead and unrelated to Isoxyidae.

== Distribution and chronology ==
Isoxys has an almost cosmopolitan distribution, and is known from twenty species distributed in deposits of North America, Siberia, Australia, China and Europe. Surusicaris is limited to the Burgess shale site in British Columbia, and only contains a single species. The four genera of Sunellidae are known from the Chengjiang biota and the Qingjiang biota in China, while Caudicaella is also known from the Heatherdale Shale in South Australia. Isoxys? giganteus is known from the Early Ordovician (Tremadocian) Fezouata Formation of Morocco. If its identification as a species of Isoxys is correct, it would be the latest surviving species of the isoxyids by 20 million years. However, due to it only being known from the carapace and not soft tissues, its identity as an isoxyid is equivocal, and could potentially represent part of a radiodont instead.

== Taxonomy ==
This cladogram shows the relationships of the isoxyids compared to other arthropod groups, according to the results of Liu et al. 2026.

- Panarthropoda
  - † "Lobopodia" (paraphyletic, ancestral to tardigrades, onychophorans and arthropods)
  - Total group Euarthropoda
    - †Megadictyon
    - - - †Kerygmachela
        - - †Pambdelurion
          - - †Opabiniidae
            - - † Radiodonta (e.g Anomalocaris)
              - Deuteropoda
                - †Erratus
                - - †Sunella
                  - - †Isoxyidae
                      - - Isoxys auritus
                        - Isoxys volucris
                      - - - Isoxys curvirostratus
                          - Isoxys acutangulus
                        - - Surusicaris
                          - "Great appendage bivalved forms"
                            - Occacaris
                            - Forfexicaris
                    - - - †Fengzhengia
                        - †Kylinxia
                      - - †Megacheira
                        - Pan-Chelicerata
                      - - †Kiisortoqia
                        - †Bushizheia
                        - Antennulata
                          - †Artiopoda (including Trilobita)
                          - Mandibulata
                            - †Fuxianhuiida
                            - - †Hymenocarina
                              - - Myriapoda
                                - Pancrustacea

The true classification of the isoxyids has been somewhat controversial. Isoxyida is generally placed outside the crown group of Arthropoda, with both Mandibulata and Chelicerata being more closely related to each other than to isoxyids. However, some studies alternatively place Isoxyida as more closely related to Mandibulata than to Chelicerata and therefore within the crown group. Isoxyids are currently placed within Deuteropoda, a proposed clade of arthropods whose members distinguished from more basal stem group arthropods like radiodonts and "gilled lobopodians" by an anatomical reorganization of the head region, multisegmented head, a hypostome/labrum complex, and pairs of biramous (two branched) segmented (arthropodized) limbs running along the body. Originally, it was thought that Isoxys was related to another bivalved arthropod from the Cambrian, Tuzoia, due to the similar aspects of their carapaces. However, a study in 2022 found that Tuzoia was a member of Hymenocarina (part of Mandibulata), and that it was not closely related to the isoxyids. The placement of sunellids as relatives of Isoxyidae has been questioned, with a detailed analysis of a well-preserved specimen of Sunella finding that sunellids were instead a kind of crustacean related to ostracods.

== Ecology ==
Species of the Isoxyida are thought to have been actively swimming predators, using their frontal appendages to capture soft-bodied prey, with the frontalmost pairs of biramous limbs aiding in food processing. The various species of the order are thought to have occupied a variety of niches, from swimming just above the seafloor (nektobenthic) to open ocean swimmers (pelagic). Swimming was likely accomplished by rhythmic movement of the legs. Isoxyid species with elongated carapace spines are likely to have engaged in vertical migration up and down the water column, like many modern marine invertebrates.

== Gallery ==
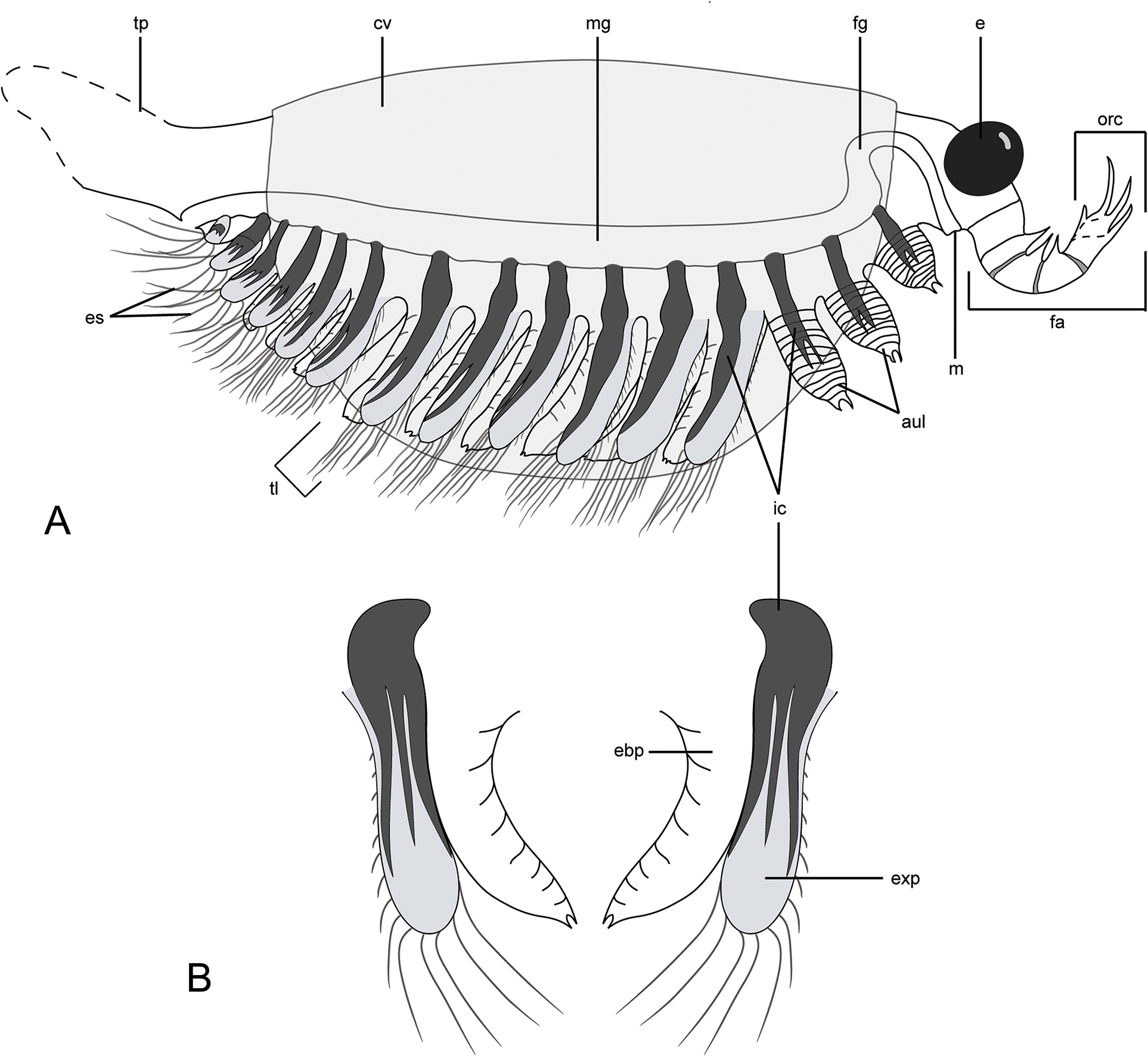
Diagram of Surusicaris

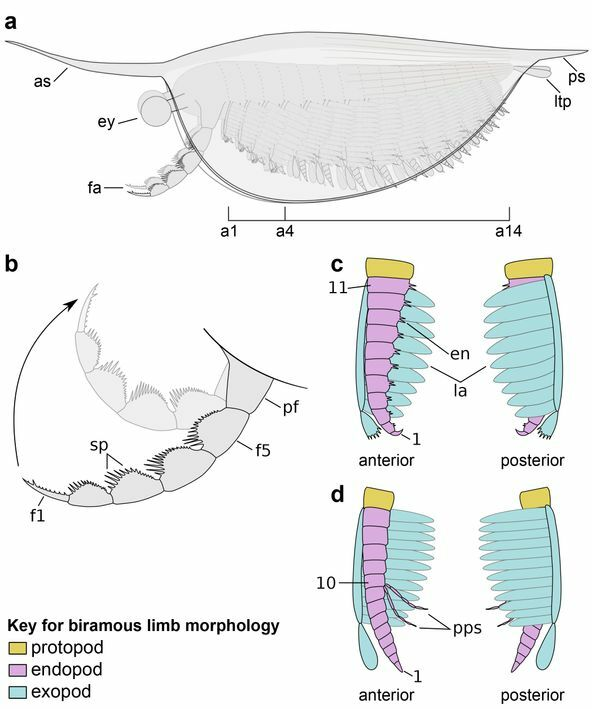
Diagram of Isoxys curvirostratus

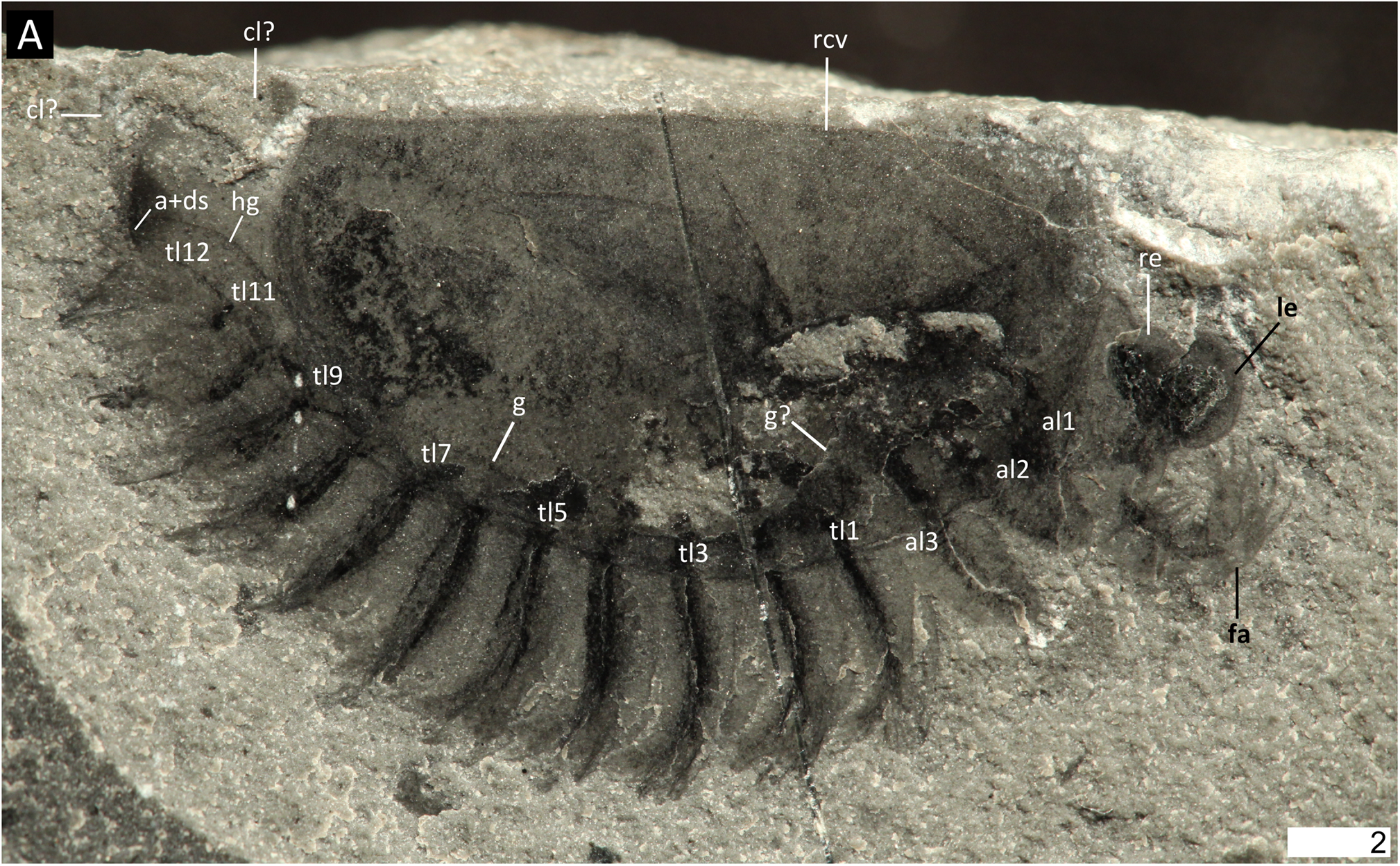
The holotype, and only known fossil, of Surusicaris

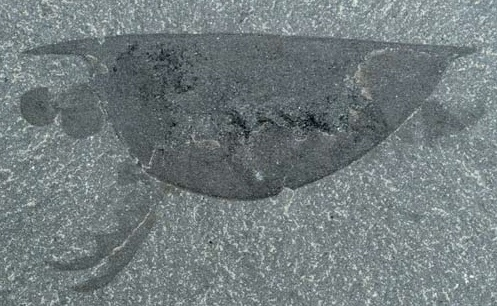
Fossil of Isoxys acutangulus

== See also ==
- Deuteropoda
