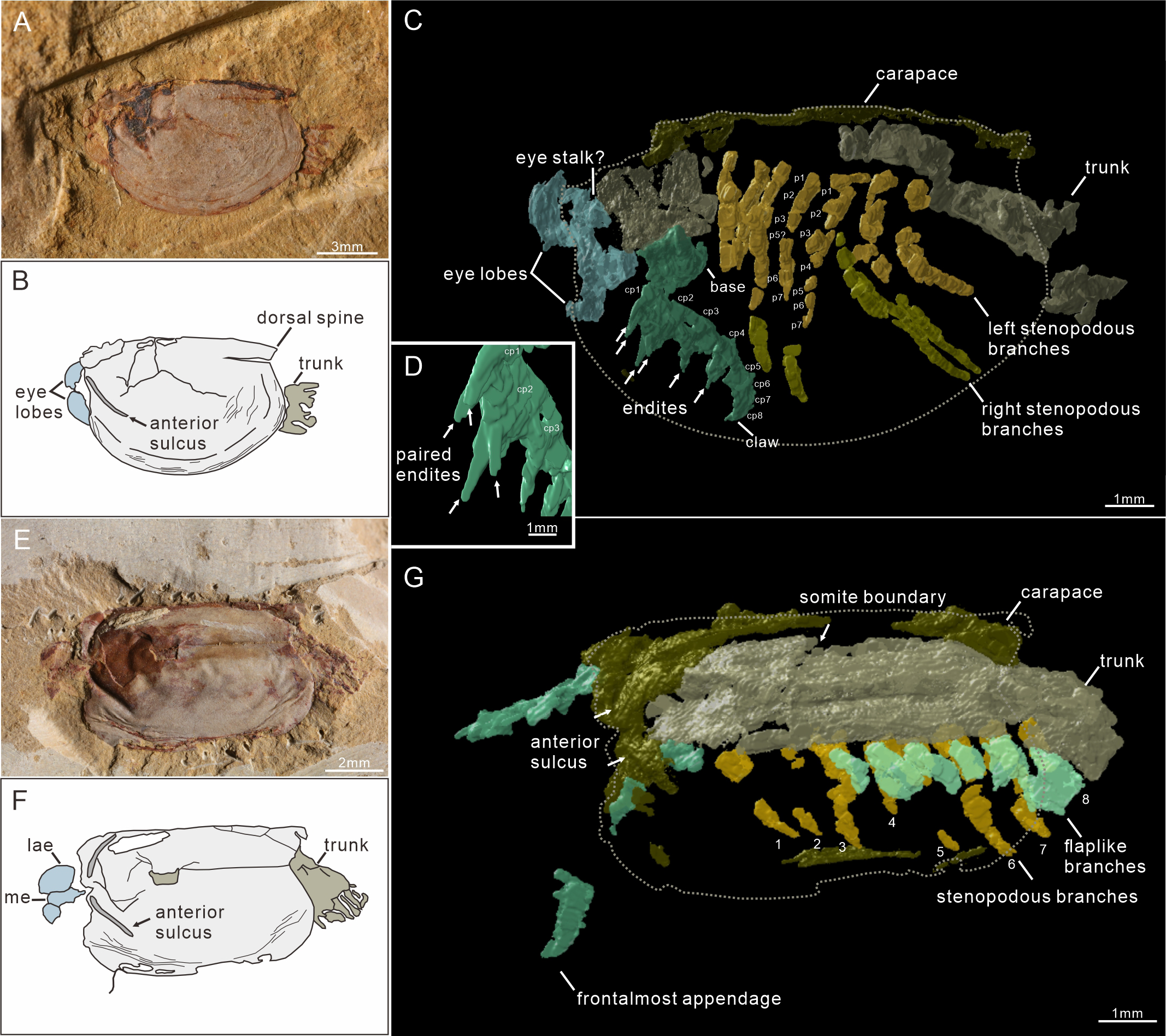
- CT scan of fossil specimen of Sunella dimorphismus
- Restoration of Sunella chimera

Scientific classification
- Kingdom: Animalia
- Clade: Panarthropoda
- Phylum: Arthropoda
- Clade: Deuteropoda
- Family: †Sunellidae
- Genus: †Sunella; Huo, 1965

Type species
- †Sunella grandis Huo, 1965

Species
- see text

Synonyms
- see text

= Sunella =

Sunella Temporal range: 529–514 Ma Some specimens may be as old as 531.94 ma.

Extinct genus of arthropod

Sunella is an extinct genus of bivalved arthropod known from the Cambrian of China. Named after paleontologist and geologist Sun Yunzhu, it was described by Huo Shicheng in 1965. It is the type genus of the family Sunellidae. The type species is S. grandis.

== Preservation ==
Usually the only part of Sunella that is preserved is the carapace, but rarely (only twenty-two times in Sunella cf. shensiella and only six in the related Combinivalvula chenjiangensis) soft tissue is also preserved. When this occurs, the carapace usually adopts a "butterfly" position, possibly due to the decay of the adductor muscles that hold it together. Only the soft parts of Sunella cf. shensiella and the related Combinivalvula chenjiangensis (Hou, 1987) have been preserved.

== Morphology ==
=== Carapace ===
Sunella grandis had a bivalved elongate roughly semicircular carapace with an anterodorsal (on the upper front part of the carapace) sulcus (groove) and short cardinal spines (spines at the tip of the midline on the front and back edge of the carapace), a typical bodyplan for a sunellid, while S. cf. shensiella had a more oval shaped carapace, shorter cardinal spines and an anterodorsal sulcus pointing at a slightly lower angle. Both species have shorter cardinal spines than Caudicaella bispinata also Caudicaella bispinata is more similar to Isoxys than other sunellids which led to its assignment to Isoxys in Zhang et al. 2018. Jinningella differs from Sunella by the presence of anterodorsal nodes. Probable Sexual dimorphism has been recorded in both species.

The carapace of S. grandis is typically 6.5-8.5 mm. The largest specimen is over 15 mm (1.5 cm)(the largest recorded for a sunellid), while Combinivalvula and Jinningella reached roughly 10 mm (1 cm) and Caudicaella typically reached 10–12 mm (1-1.2 cm) due to its long cardinal spines compared to other sunellids. In comparison to other bivalved arthropods of the Cambrian, sunellids where medium-sized, larger than the bradoriids, which rarely reached above 10 mm (1 cm) and smaller than the Isoxyida which were often at least a few centimeters long with the exception of the dwarf I. carbonelli which grew to 11 mm (1.1 cm) and Surusicaris which grew to 14 mm (1.4 cm).

==== Distinguishing from similar arthropods ====
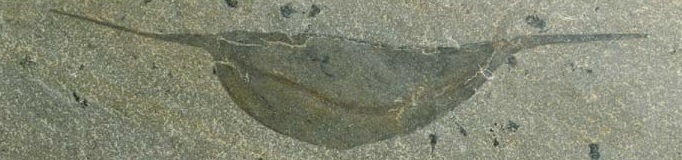
Isoxys has longer cardinal spines than Sunella, as seen in this fossil of I. longissimus.

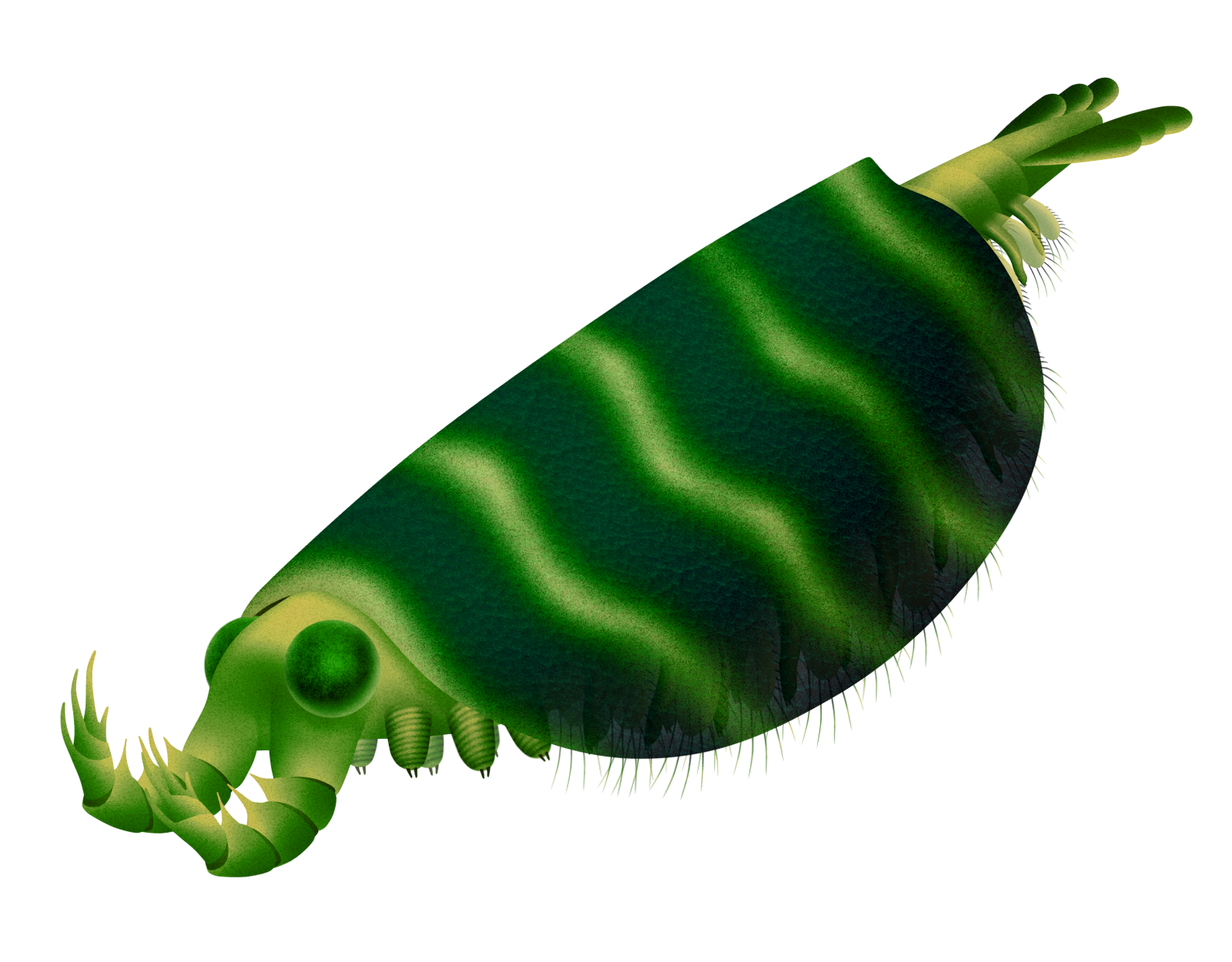
Surusicaris (Isoxyidae) lacks cardinal spines.

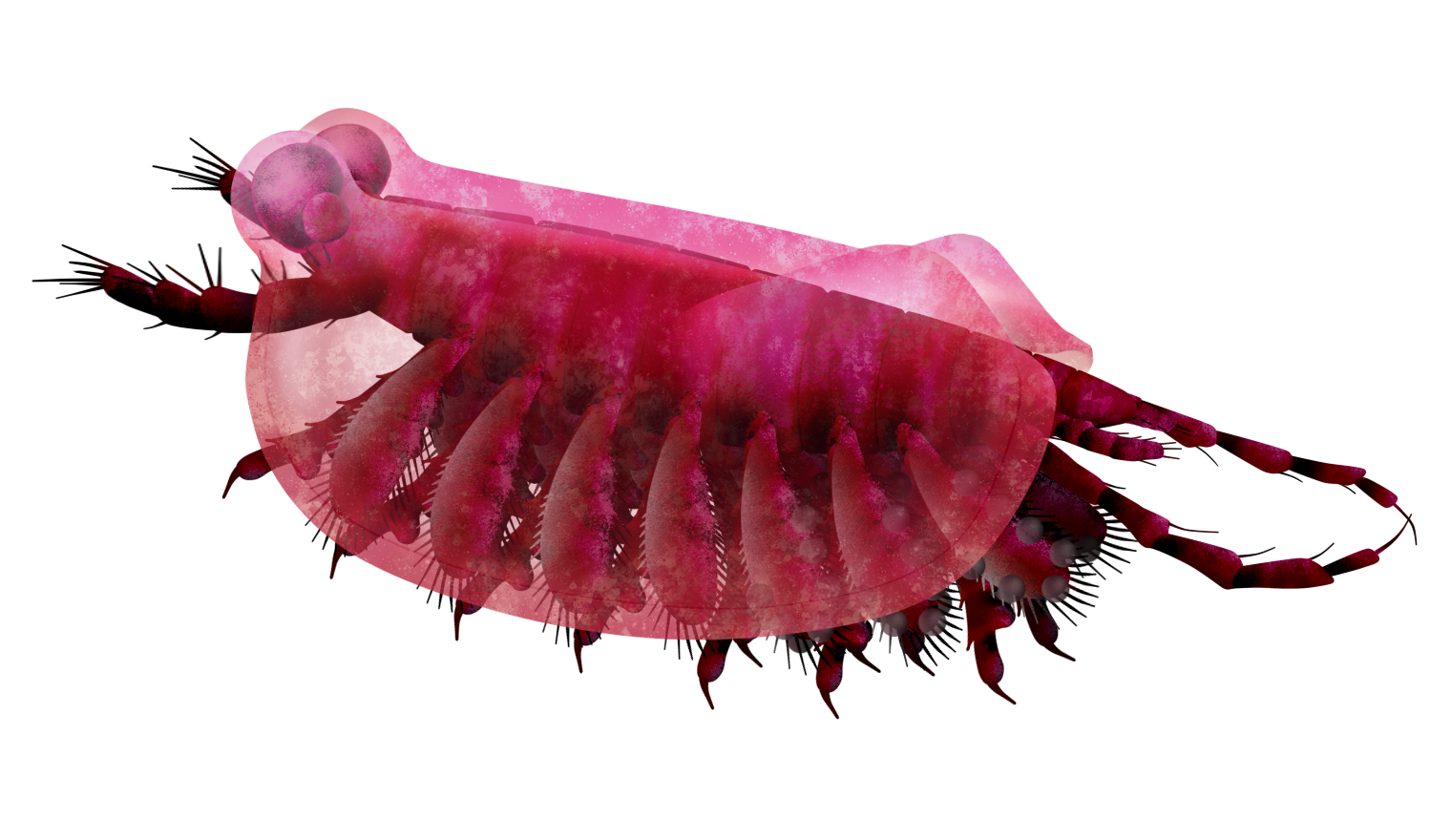
Bradoriids, such as Kunmingella also lack cardinal spines.

The carapace of Sunella can be distinguished from Isoxys by the possession of an anterodorsal sulcus, shorter cardinal spines and different carapace shapes. Sunella be distinguished from the isoxyid Surusicaris by the lack of an anterodorsal sulcus and the lack of cardinal spines. Bradoriids, which share the possession of an anterodorsal sulcus (leading to the former assignment of Sunella to Bradoriida) can be distinguished from Sunella by the possession of cardinal spines.

=== Soft tissue anatomy ===
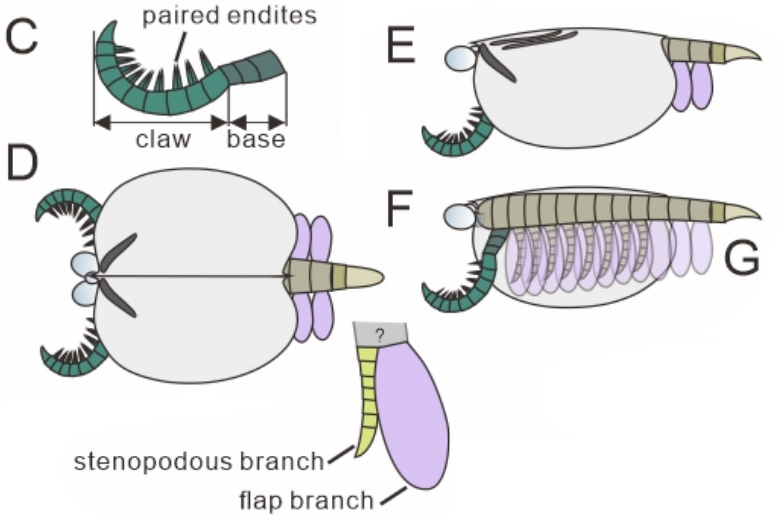
Anatomical diagrams of Sunella dimorphismus from Liu et al. 2026.

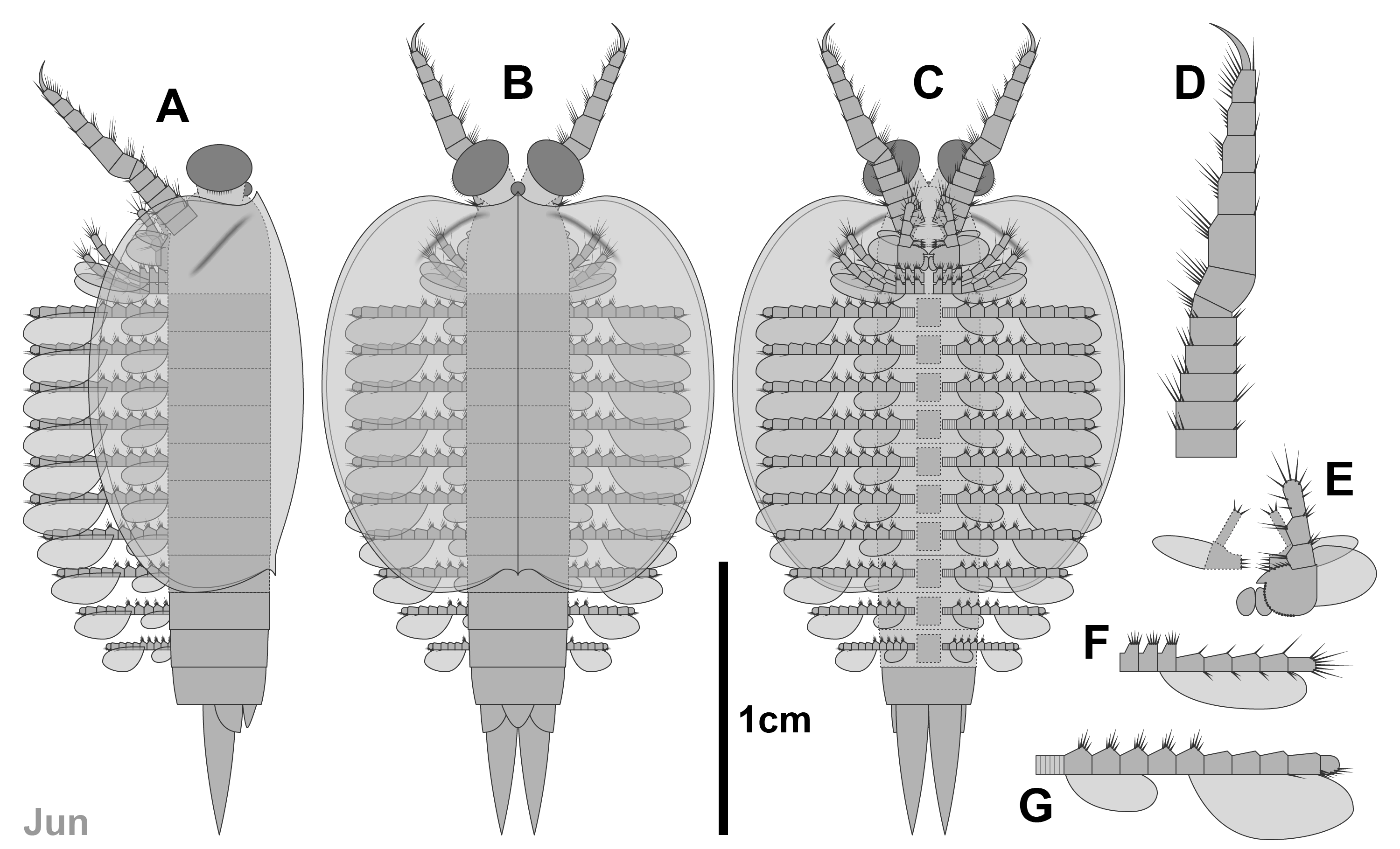
Anatomical diagrams of Sunella chimera based on Zhai et al. 2026.

The soft part anatomy of Sunella was previously poorly known. It was thoroughly described for the new species (S. dimorphismus / S. chimera) coined in two 2026 studies, however, with drastically different interpretations.

The study by Liu et al. showed that S. dimorphismus had a pair of stalked eyes as well as a central medial eye attached to the head, to which was also attached a pair of upward and inward curling raptorial appendages similar to those of Isoxys. The raptorial appendages were composed of twelve segments, with the 9 segments furthest from the body each bearing a pair of upward-facing (endite) spines with the last segment bearing a terminal spine. There is no other head appendages behind them. Beneath the bivalved carapace was a segmented trunk made up of 8 segments, each of which likely had attached one pair of biramous (two-branched) limbs, composed of a stenopodous (stout) endopod (lower leg-like branch) with at least 7 segments (podomeres) and flap-like exopods (upper branches). This was followed by a posterior abdomen region with three segments each of which bore limbs only composed of the flap-like exopods. The body ended with a terminal paddle-shaped telson.

The study by Zhai et al. on the other hand, showed that S. chimera possess anatomy of mandibulates, or more specifically, crustaceans, as the head bore 5 pairs of appendages in total and most were specialized mouthparts. The frontalmost raptorial appendages were composed of 13 segments, and each "endite" was actually cluster of spine-like setae (spine-like hairs). The second to fifth appendages are all biramous, bearing flap-like exopods. The second appendages is highly reduced with small endites and possible endopods, equivalent to the second antennae of crustaceans. The third appendages are robust mandibles with 3-segmented palps. The fourth and fifth appendages are subequal maxilla, each possess 3-segmented protopod (basal segments) and 5-segmented endopod. All trunk appendages are subequally biramous, thus there is no specialized abdominal region. Each trunk appendages composed of a 5-segmented protopod, a 5-segmented endopod and a flap-like exopod, similar to the maxilla. However, each trunk appendages also possess a small epipod (leaf-like respiratory outgrowth) at the base, similar to aquatic crustaceans. The protopodal endites of both maxilla and trunk appendages possess bundles of setae, forming mesh-like structures between the appendages. The study also found the telson is more complex, terminated with 2 caudal rami and 3 small basal plates.

== Ecology ==
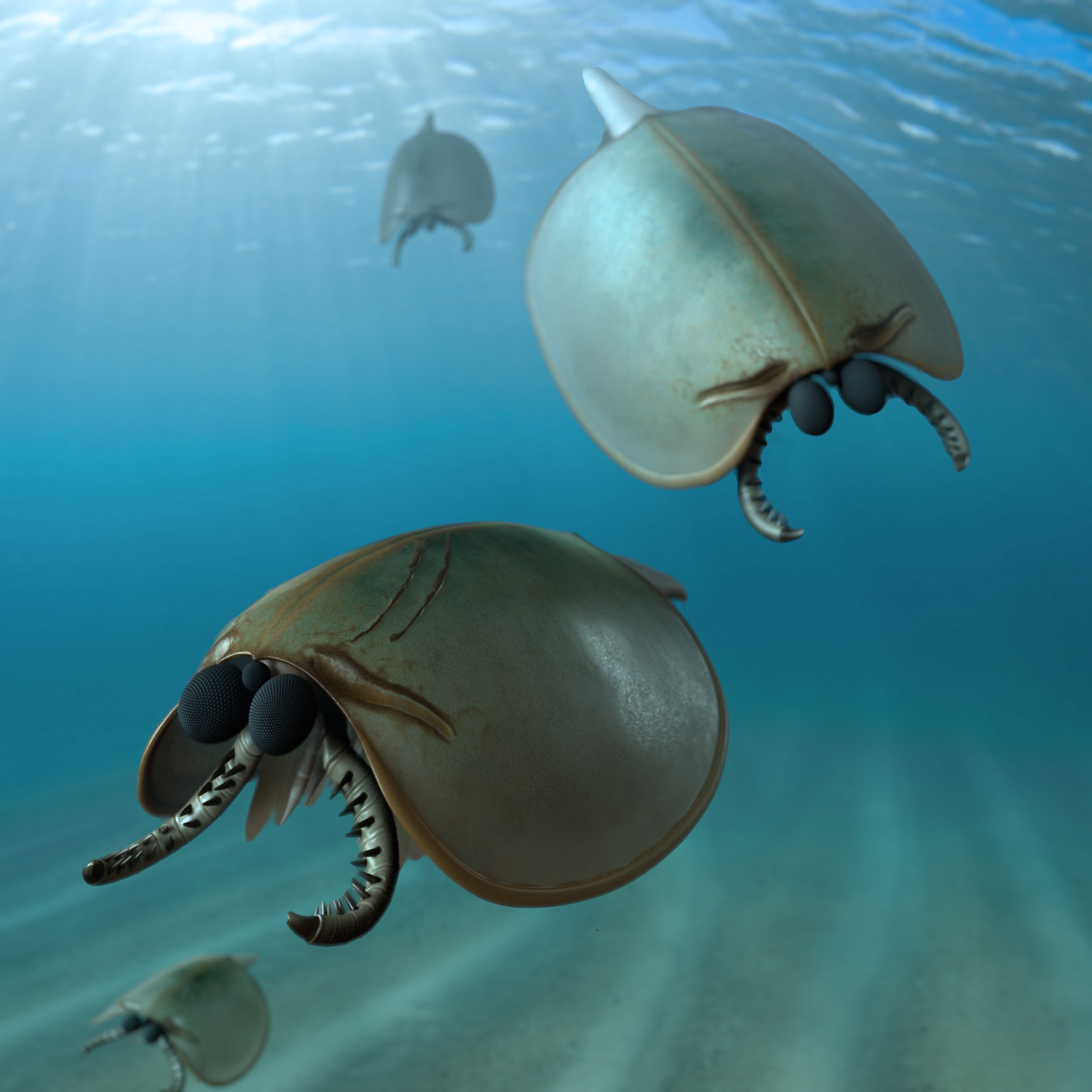
Ecological reconstruction of Sunella dimorphismus

The grasping raptorial appendages and specialized mouthparts of Sunella have led to suggestions that it was an active and mobile predator of small-bodied prey, using its large eyes to detect prey, with its flap-like exopods serving to propel it through the water, with the endopods possibly sometimes used for walking along the seafloor. On the other hand, the mesh-like structure formed by setose endites are suitable for filter feeding, suggest a dual role of Sunella as both predator and filter feeder. Due to its small size, Sunella was likely a relatively low level member of the food chain and predated upon by larger organisms.

== Distribution ==
Sunella fossils have been found in the Chengjiang biota (exact locality cannot be determined; dated to no older than 518 Ma), the Shuijingtuo formation (dated to around 526.5 Ma), the Qingjiang biota (dated to ~518 ma), the Niutitang formation ( generally Meishucunian (Cambrian Stage 2) to Nangaoan (Cambrian Stage 3) but may be up to as old as the Fortunian in some sections) and the Guojiaba formation (tentatively assigned to Cambrian Stage 3), all of which are in China. Similar fossils have been found at other formations in China but they are relatively uncommon and poorly studied and therefore cannot be confidently assigned to this genus or even Sunellidae. The former species Caudicaella bispinata is also known from the Heatherdale shale in Australia.

== Classification ==
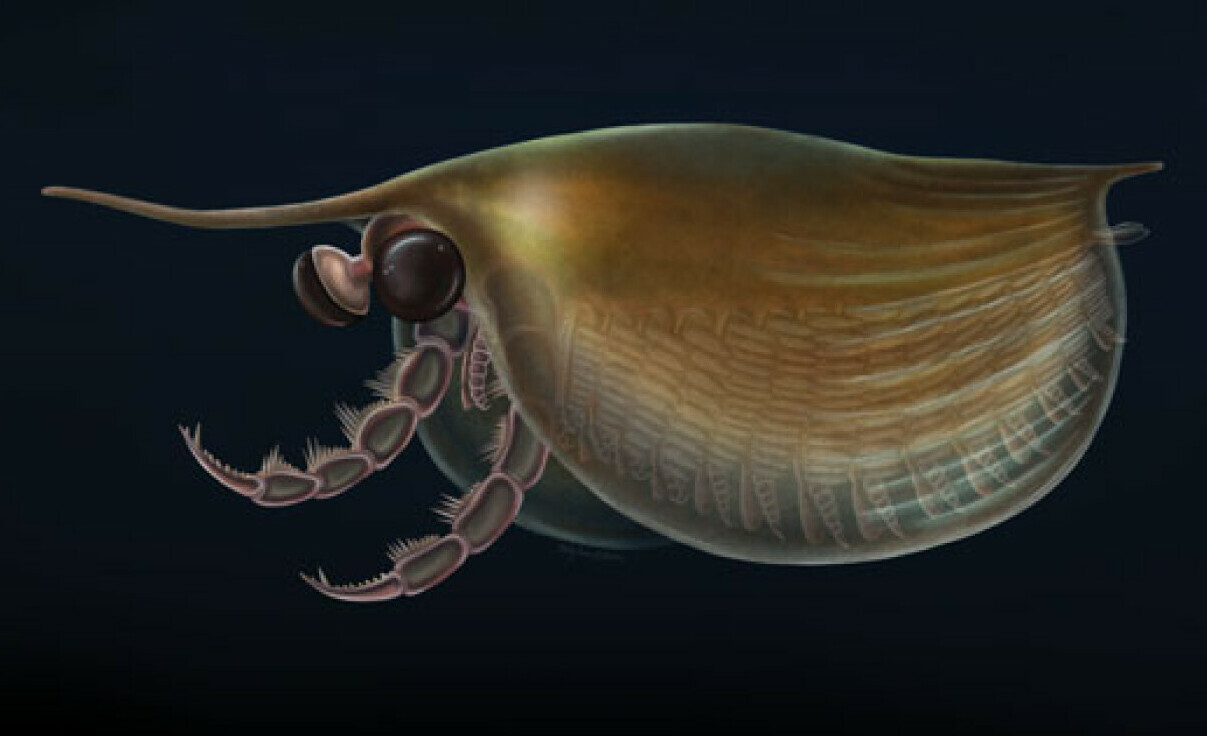
Sunella has been suggested to be related to Isoxys (Walcott, 1890), though this relationship has later been questioned

In the original description (Huo, 1965), Sunella was considered to be an ostracod. Most later studies have identified it as an arthropod of uncertain affinities, though some studies historically considered it a bradoriid during the 1980s. Sunella has often been suggested to be closely related to Isoxys, a genus of Cambrian arthropods with a superficially similar bivalved carapace, though true understanding of Sunella's affinities was for a long time hampered by poor knowledge of its soft tissue. A 2026 description of soft tissue remains of Sunellla by Liu and colleagues, suggested that Sunella represented one of the earliest diverging members of the arthropod clade Deuteropoda, and that while morphologically similar, Isoxys was more closely related to living arthropods than to Sunella. However, a later 2026 study by Zhai and colleagues reveal more details on the appendages, which suggest Sunella to be a pancrustacean mandibulate instead, sister to ostracods or the clade including ostracods and Leptostraca. Cladogram after Liu et al. 2026, with Sunella as basal arthropod:

- Panarthropoda
  - † "Lobopodia" (paraphyletic, ancestral to tardigrades, onychophorans and arthropods)
  - Total group Euarthropoda
    - †Megadictyon
    - - - †Kerygmachela
        - - †Pambdelurion
          - - †Opabiniidae
            - - † Radiodonta (e.g Anomalocaris)
              - Deuteropoda
                - †Erratus
                - - †Sunella
                  - - †Isoxyidae + "Great appendage bivalved forms"
                    - - - †Fengzhengia
                        - †Kylinxia
                      - - †Megacheira
                        - Pan-Chelicerata
                      - - †Kiisortoqia
                        - †Bushizheia
                        - Antennulata
                          - †Artiopoda (including Trilobita)
                          - Mandibulata
                            - †Fuxianhuiida
                            - - †Hymenocarina
                              - - Myriapoda
                                - Pancrustacea

Cladogram of bayesian analysis after Zhai et al. 2026, with Sunella as crown-group pancrustacean:

- - Radiodonta
  - - Isoxyida (paraphyletic)
    - Kylinxia
    - - - Megacheira (paraphyletic)
        - - Artiopoda (paraphyletic)
          - Chelicerata
    - - Bradoriida (paraphyletic)
      - - "hymenocarines" (e.g. Balhuticaris, Pectocaris)
        - Fuxianhuiida
        - - "hymenocarines" (e.g. Tuzoia, Waptia)
          - Myriapoda
          - - "hymenocarines" (Ercaicunia, Clypecaris)
            - Pancrustacea
              - Branchiopoda
              - Cephalocarida
              - Orsten crustaceans (e.g. Yicaris, Rehbachiella)
              - - Sunella
                - Ostracoda
              - - Copepoda
                - - Remipedia
                  - Malacostraca

=== Species ===
==== Sunella grandis ====
Sunella grandis (Huo, 1965) is the type species of Sunella. It is known from the Chengjiang Biota of Yunnan, China. Probable sexual dimorphism has been observed.

==== Sunella nanchengensis ====
Sunella nanchengensis (Huo, 1965) is a probable sexual dimorph of S. grandis and is generally considered a synonym of S. grandis. It was named after Nancheng, the previous romanization of Nanzheng, which is the type locality of the species.

==== Sunella shensiella ====
Sunella shensiella (Huo,1965) is the only species of Sunella apart from S. grandis that is not considered a synonym of S. grandis or has been reassigned to a different genus. Probable sexual dimorphism has been observed. It is one of the species where soft anatomy has been preserved. Known from the Helinpu Formation of southwest China.

==== Sunella dimorphismus ====
Sunella dimorphismus (Liu et al, 2026) has preserved anatomy including trunk and appendages. Known from the Chengjiang Biota. However, the name was later pointed out to be nomen nudum as no type specimen was specified in the original description, at the same time the conspecific specimens was described as S. chimera by Zhai et al. 2026.

==== Sunella chimera ====
Sunella chimera (Zhai et al, 2026) is the new valid name applied to the aforementioned S. dimorphismus specimens. The new description providing more details on the body and appendages, especially the mouthparts, significantly rewrite the taxonomic position of suneliids.

=== Synonyms ===
Sunellidae, which Sunella belongs to originally included two other genera, Chiella (Huo, 1965) and Luella (Huo, 1965), but Chiella was later considered a separate species within Sunella, but after Huo & Shu, 1985 Chiella was considered a junior synonym of Sunella and after Zhang & Shu, 2007 Luella was considered a probable sexual dimorph of Sunella.

=== Former species ===
==== Caudicaella (Sunella) bispinata ====
A species that previously belonged to Sunella, S. bispinata, was moved to a new genus, Caudicaella (Sun et al. 2021) as Caudicaella bispinata (Cui and Huo, 1990). Synonyms include Isoxys bispinata (Zhang et al., 2018) (not to be confused with Isoxys bispinatus) Isoxys sp. (Sun et al. 2021) (for the specimens from the Heatherdale shale, not the Shuijingtuo formation)

==== Tuzoia? (Sunella) parva ====
One former species is Sunella parva (Melnikova, 1988), which may be the larval form of a new species of Tuzoia, which was rejected from Sunella by Melnikova 1998 and may need to be assigned to its own genus. It has also been suggested to be a bradoriid (Melnikova, 1998)
