= Qingjiang biota =

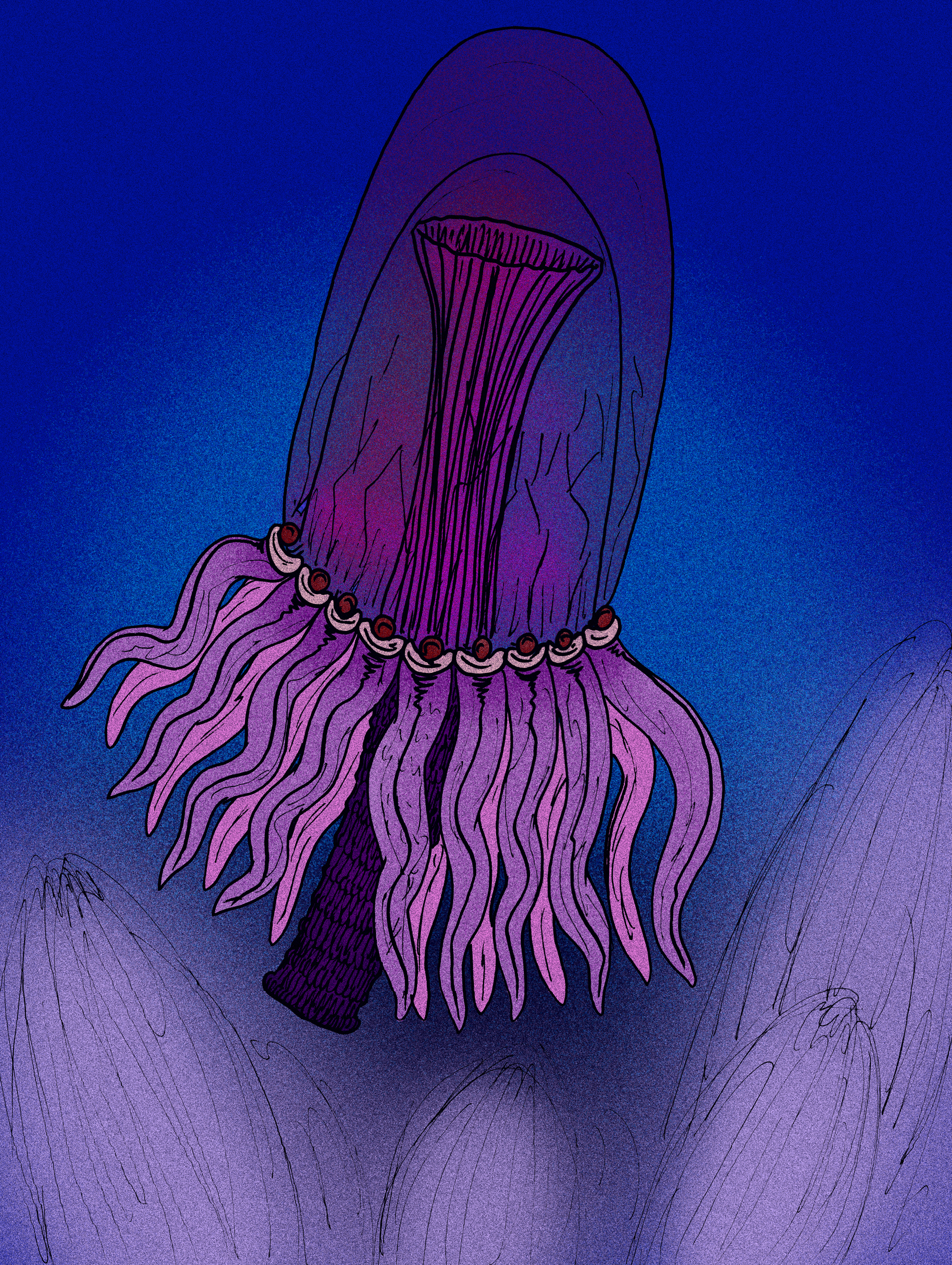
Restoration of an unnamed Qingjiang medusa

The Qingjiang biota are a major discovery of fossilized remains dating from the early Cambrian period approximately 518 million years ago. The remains consist of at least 20,000 individual specimens, and were discovered near the Danshui River in the Hubei province of China in 2019. The site is particularly notable due to both the large proportion of new taxa represented (approximately 53% of the specimens), and due to the large amount of soft-body tissue of the ancient specimens that was preserved, likely due to the organisms being rapidly covered in sediment prior to fossilization, that allowed for the detailed preservation of even fragile creatures such as jellyfish. Shelly fossils found at the site include trilobites, radiodonts, lobopods, bradoriids, brachiopods, hyolithids, mollusks, chancelloriids, kinorhynchs, priapulids, and articulated sponge spicules.

The site is a Burgess Shale type preservation, and has been widely compared to the Burgess Shale in terms of the site's richness and significance. The discovery has been described as one of the most significant of its kind in the last 100 years. Initial publications regarding the site stated that 4,351 of the collected specimens had been examined, and 101 species had been identified, 53 of which were new to science.

Talks are reportedly underway with local government to protect the site to ensure the longevity of continued research on the deposited specimens.

== List of taxa ==
=== Bacteria ===
Genus	Species	Phylum	Notes	Image
Qingjiangonema	Q. cambria	Thermodesulfobacteriota	"Qingjiangonema is a long filamentous form comprising hundreds of cells filled by equimorphic and equidimensional pyrite microcrystals with a light sulfur isotope composition. Multiple lines of evidence indicate Qingjiangonema was a sulfate-reducing bacterium that exhibits similar patterns of cell organization to filamentous forms within the phylum Desulfobacterota, including the sulfate-reducing Desulfonema and sulfide-oxidizing cable bacteria."	

=== Eukaryota incertae sedis ===
Genus	Notes	Image
Chuaria	Chuaria is a spheroidal and thick-walled eukaryote that is typically regarded as having algal affinities based on cell walls and biogeochemical analyses. It appears to have existed from the late Paleoproterozoic (1670–1640 Ma) to the Qingjiang Formation (518 Ma). "Like many Precambrian microfossils (Simpson, 1944, Schopf, 1994, Dvořák et al., 2015), its extraordinarily slow rate of evolutionary change was probably due to the asexual reproduction and wide ecological tolerance. Accordingly, if Chuaria represented a homogeneous eukaryote, it would make sense that it retained a consistent morphology for an exceptionally long geological time. Such hypobradytelic organism can be seen in macro-organisms as well, e.g., Marchantites Brongniart, 1849 of bryophyte (Li et al., 2014), or Lampetra Bonnaterre, 1788 of chordate (Gess et al., 2006)."	

=== Algae ===
Genus	Species	Clade	Notes	Image
Megaspirellus?			Megaspirellus was originally identified as an alga but has been more recently tentatively re-interpreted as a cololite (fossilized intestinal casts of faecal material) and a junior synonym of Cilindrotomaculum.	
Qingjiangthallus	Q. cystocarpium	Florideophyceae	A red alga. "Thalli comprise flat and ribbon‐shaped branches showing different branching patterns, some short branchlets, discoid or globose holdfasts and an unexpected occurrence of possible cystocarps (reproductive bodies)."	
Sinocylindra		Chlorophyta?	"Smooth cylindrical ribbons 0.19–2.2mm wide and up to 74.0 mm long. Ribbons are flexible and can be curved, looped or folded, but are not regularly coiled as in Megaspirellus or Grypania. No branching or holdfast structures are associated with the ribbons."	

=== Non-bilaterian animals ===
Genus	Species	Phylum	Class	Order	Family	Notes	Image
Choia		Porifera	Demospongiae	Protomonaxonida	Choiidae		
Crumillospongia		Porifera	Demospongiae	Protomonaxonida	Hazeliidae		
Halichondrites		Porifera	Demospongiae	Protomonaxonida	Halichondritidae		
Hazelia		Porifera	Demospongiae	Protomonaxonida	Hazeliidae		
Leptomitella		Porifera	Demospongiae	Protomonaxonida			
Leptomitus		Porifera	Demospongiae	Protomonaxonida	Leptomitidae		
Paraleptomitella		Porifera	Demospongiae	Protomonaxonida	Leptomitidae		
Saetaspongia		Porifera	Demospongiae	Protomonaxonida			
Sanshapentella	S. tentoriformis	Porifera	Hexactinellida			"Owing to the presence of definite hexactines and hexactine-derived spicules, Sanshapentella can be assigned to Hexactinellida... Sponge body is composed of a stout trunk (usually 10–35 mm in thickness) and four or five conical branches at the top."	
Allonnia		Possible stem-group Eumetazoa		Chancelloriida	Chancelloriidae		
Xianguangia	X. sinica	Stem-group Ctenophora			Dinomischidae	Resolved as being in the monophyletic family Dinomischidae with Daihua and Dinomischus.	
Dinomischus		Stem-group Ctenophora			Dinomischidae		
Sphenothallus		Cnidaria		Conulatae		Their shell composition and microstructure indicate relatedness to conulariids	

=== Spiralia ===
Genus	Species	Phylum	Class	Order	Family	Notes	Image
Ambrolinevitus		Possible stem-group Lophotrochozoa	Hyolitha				
Archotuba		Possible stem-group Lophotrochozoa	Hyolitha				
Burithes	B. yunnanensis	Possible stem-group Lophotrochozoa	Hyolitha				
Qingjianglepas	Q. elegans	Mollusca		Helcionelloida		"Limpet-formed shell, flattened, with elliptical aperture. Radial sculpture of numerous high and narrow primary and secondary ribs, intersecting the concentric growth lines as imbrications. A prominent fold on anterior flank of shell, extending from apical region toward the anterior edge of aperture."	
Heliomedusa	H. orienta	stem-group Brachiopoda			Mickwitziidae	Whether Heliomedusa and Mickwitzia are the same genus is debated.	
Diandongia		Brachiopoda	Lingulata	Lingulida	Neobolidae	"The generic composition of the Botsfordiidae was recently emended by Popov et al. (2015), who restricted the family to include only genera exhibiting a pitted larval shell, a finely pustulose postlarval shell and lacking well-developed muscle platforms as well as a prominent dorsal median ridge. The linguloid family Neobolidae was reintroduced, encompassing several early Cambrian lingulide genera that previously had been assigned to the Botsfordiidae, including Neobolus and Edreja (Holmer and Popov, 2000). "	
Lingulella		Brachiopoda	Lingulata	Lingulida	Obolidae		

=== Ecdysozoa ===
Genus	Species	Phylum	Class	Order	Family	Notes	Image
Alalcomenaeus		Arthropoda	Megacheira	Leanchoiliida	Leanchoiliidae		
Amplectobelua?		Arthropoda		Radiodonta	Amplectobeluidae		
Branchiocaris	B. yunnanensis	Arthropoda		Hymenocarina	Protocarididae		
Burgessia		Arthropoda				The affinities of Burgessia are contentious. It may be a basally derived crown-arthropod.	
Combinivalvula	C. chengjiangensis	Arthropoda			Sunellidae	The family Sunnellidae includes three genera: Combinivalvula, Sunella, and Jinningella. "Sunellids resemble Isoxys Walcott, 1890 to which they may be closely related; both possess a bivalved, elongated carapace with cardinal spines that almost entirely covers the body. However, neither cephalic appendages nor proximal portions of trunk limbs are visible in sunellids, and thus, their systematic position remains uncertain."	
Duplapex	D. anima	Arthropoda		Hymenocarina	Tuzoiidae	"... its layered valves are distinguished from those of Tuzoia, and Duplapex has unique ventral notches and doublure spines. These justify the erection of a new genus within the Family Tuzoiidae."	
Estaingia		Arthropoda	Trilobita	Ptychopariida	Estaingiidae		
Isoxys	I. minor	Arthropoda		Isoxyida	Isoxyidae	I. minor appears to have produced many eggs (approximately 300 per clutch), and egg-bearing individuals were about half the size of adults, indicating r-selection in this species. This is currently the earliest diverging arthropod that displays brood behavior.	
Kuanyangaspis		Arthropoda	Trilobita				
Leanchoilia		Arthropoda	Megacheira	Leanchoiliida	Leanchoiliidae		
Liangshanella		Arthropoda		Bradoriida			
Misszhouia	M. longicaudata	Arthropoda		Nektaspida	Naraoiidae		
Mollisonia		Arthropoda		Mollisoniida		Stem-group Chelicerata	
Naraoia	N. spinosa	Arthropoda		Nektaspida	Naraoiidae		
Redlichia		Arthropoda	Trilobita	Redlichiida	Redlichiidae		
Stanleycaris	S. qingjiangensis	Arthropoda		Radiodonta	Hurdiidae		
Sunella	S. grandis	Arthropoda			Sunellidae		

=== Deuterostomes ===
Genus	Species	Clade	Notes	Image
Eldonia		Stem-group Ambulacraria	A member of the stem-ambulacrarian clade Cambroernida.	
Yunnanozoon		Possible stem-group Deuterostome		
Banffia		Possible stem-group Deuterostome	Banffia is a member of the clade Vetulicolia, which may belong to stem-Deuterostomia.	

== See also ==
- Maotianshan Shales
- Guanshan biota
