= Jinningella =

Jinningella Temporal range: 518 Ma

Scientific classification
- Kingdom: Animalia
- Phylum: Arthropoda
- Family: †Sunellidae
- Genus: †Jinningella; Huo & Shu, 1985
- Species: †J. communis

Binomial name
- †Jinningella communis Huo & Shu, 1985

Genus of Sunellid arthropod

Jinningella is a genus of sunellid arthropod.

== Description ==
Jinningella is similar to the genus Sunella and Combinivalvula in general anatomy, differing in the fact that no sexual dimorphism is known and the possession of anterodorsal nodes. It reached around 10 mm. Other sunellids reached similar sizes, Combinivalvula reached a similar size, Caudicaella specimens can be up to 12 mm and the largest Sunella fossil was roughly 15 mm.

== Distribution ==
Jinningella fossils are only found in the Chengjiang biota.

== See also ==
- Isoxys communis
