= Qingjiang =

Qingjiang may refer to:

- Qing River, a tributary of the Yangtze in Hubei, China
- Huai'an, formerly Qingjiang, Jiangsu, China
- Zhangshu, formerly Qingjiang County, Jiangxi, China
- Qingjiang, Zixing (清江镇), a town of Zixing, Hunan
- Qingjiang biota, a Burgess Shale type preservation in China
