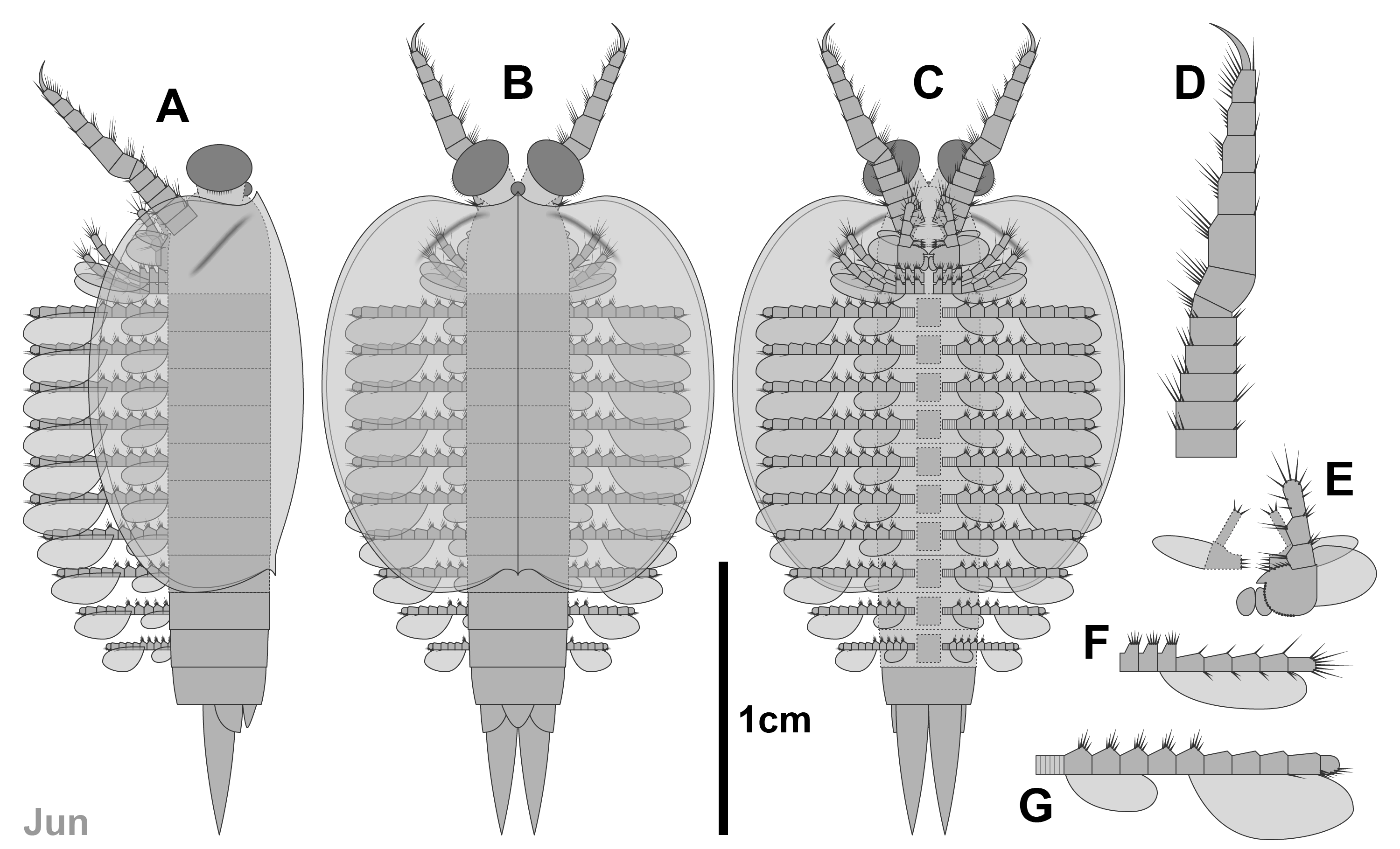
- Intepretive diagram of Sunella

Scientific classification
- Kingdom: Animalia
- Phylum: Arthropoda
- Clade: Deuteropoda
- Family: †Sunellidae; Huo, 1965

Type genus
- Sunella

Genera
- Caudicaella Cui & Huo, 1990; Combinivalvula Hou,1987; Jinningella Huo & Shu, 1985; Sunella Huo, 1965

= Sunellidae =

Sunellidae Temporal range: Cambrian stage 2–Cambrian stage 3

Family of arthropods

Sunellidae is a family of bivalved arthropods known from the Cambrian period.

== History of study ==
Sunellidae was originally made to include three genera: Sunella, Chiella and Luella but later the latter two where synonymized with Sunella. Later two other genera, Jinningella &and Combinivalvula were described and the definition of Sunellidae was strictened by adding the additional defining feature, the possession of an anterodorsal sulcus. In 2021 one species of Sunella, S. bispinata was moved to the genus Caudicaella. It was assigned to Isoxyida in 2025.

Liu et al, 2026 found sunellids to be basal members of Deuteropoda,; Zhai et al. 2026 found them to be crown-group pancrustaceans, closely related to ostracods.

== Distribution ==
Sunellidae have been found in the Chengjiang biota (exact locality cannot be determined) (dated to no older than 518 Ma), the Guojiaba formation ( tentatively assigned to Cambrian stage 3), the Qingjiang biota (dated to ~518 ma) and the Shuijingtuo Formation (dated to ~526.5 Ma) all of which are in China. Various more poorly documented formations also yield Sunellids. Caudicaella aff. bispinata specimens are also known from the Heatherdale Formation in Australia.

== Preservation ==
Usually the soft anatomy of sunellids is not preserved but a few examples of soft part preservation (only twenty-two times in Sunella cf. shensiella and six in Combinivalvula chenjiangensis) have been recorded in Combinivalvula chenjiangensis and Sunella cf. shensiella.

== Anatomy ==
Sunellids have a roughly semicircular carapace and have anterior and posterior carndinal spines. They are distinguished from other similar arthropods by the presence of an anterodorsal sulcus (a feature shared by the unrelated bradoriids). Probable sexual dimorphism has been observed in Sunella.

== Phylogeny ==
After Liu et al. 2026:

- Panarthropoda
  - † "Lobopodia" (paraphyletic, ancestral to tardigrades, onychophorans and arthropods)
  - Total group Euarthropoda
    - †Megadictyon
    - - - †Kerygmachela
        - - †Pambdelurion
          - - †Opabiniidae
            - - † Radiodonta (e.g Anomalocaris)
              - Deuteropoda
                - †Erratus
                - - †Sunellidae (Sunella)
                  - - †Isoxyidae + "Great appendage bivalved forms"
                    - - - †Fengzhengia
                        - †Kylinxia
                      - - †Megacheira
                        - Pan-Chelicerata
                      - - †Kiisortoqia
                        - †Bushizheia
                        - Antennulata
                          - †Artiopoda (including Trilobita)
                          - Mandibulata
                            - †Fuxianhuiida
                            - - †Hymenocarina
                              - - Myriapoda
                                - Pancrustacea

Cladogram of bayesian analysis after Zhai et al. 2026, with Sunella as crown-group pancrustacean:

- - Radiodonta
  - - Isoxyida (paraphyletic)
    - Kylinxia
    - - - Megacheira (paraphyletic)
        - - Artiopoda (paraphyletic)
          - Chelicerata
    - - Bradoriida (paraphyletic)
      - - "hymenocarines" (e.g. Balhuticaris, Pectocaris)
        - Fuxianhuiida
        - - "hymenocarines" (e.g. Tuzoia, Waptia)
          - Myriapoda
          - - "hymenocarines" (Ercaicunia, Clypecaris)
            - Pancrustacea
              - Branchiopoda
              - Cephalocarida
              - Orsten crustaceans (e.g. Yicaris, Rehbachiella)
              - - Sunella
                - Ostracoda
              - - Copepoda
                - - Remipedia
                  - Malacostraca
