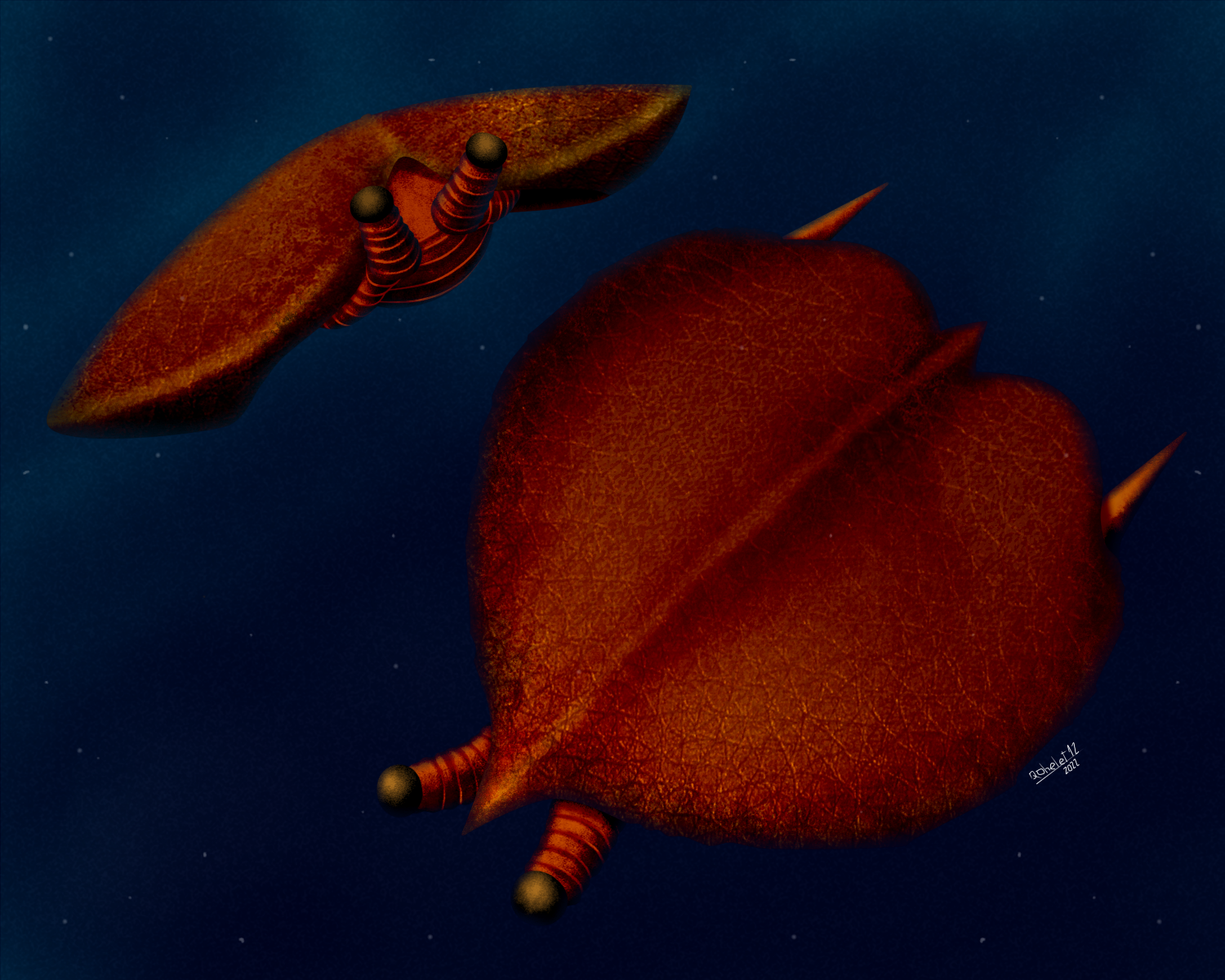
- Life restoration of Duplapex, based on the original description

Scientific classification
- Kingdom: Animalia
- Phylum: Arthropoda
- Order: †Hymenocarina
- Family: †Tuzoiidae
- Genus: †Duplapex; Ma et al. 2021
- Species: †D. anima

Binomial name
- †Duplapex anima Ma et al. 2021

= Duplapex =

Duplapex Temporal range: Cambrian Stage 3

Extinct genus of arthropods

Duplapex is an extinct genus of bivalved arthropod known from the Cambrian Stage 3 aged Qingjiang biota of Hubei, China, with a single species. D. anima. It is thought to be a close relative of Tuzoia, but unlike it, the reticulated (net patterned) bivalved carapace was interpreted to have opened at a wide angle. The carapace had a pair of spines projecting posteriorly. In its original description, it was suggested to have eyes on annulated stalks, but later research suggested that these may have been preservational artifacts instead.

The general morphology of Duplapex differs from Tuzoia by its layered valves, unique ventral notches and doublure spines. These justified the erection of a new genus.
