= Caudicaella =

Caudicaella Temporal range: Cambrian

Scientific classification
- Kingdom: Animalia
- Phylum: Arthropoda
- Family: †Sunellidae
- Genus: †Caudicaella
- Species: †C. bispinata

Binomial name
- †Caudicaella bispinata (Cui & Huo, 1990)

Synonyms
- Sunella bispinata Cui & Huo 1990; Isoxys bispinata Zhang et al 2018

Extinct genus of arthropods

Caudicaella is a genus of arthropods in the family Sunellidae. It used to be classified as Sunella bispinata but was moved to a new genus in 2021.

== Distribution ==
Caudicaella has been found in the Shuijingtuo formation in China, and the Heatherdale formation in Australia.
