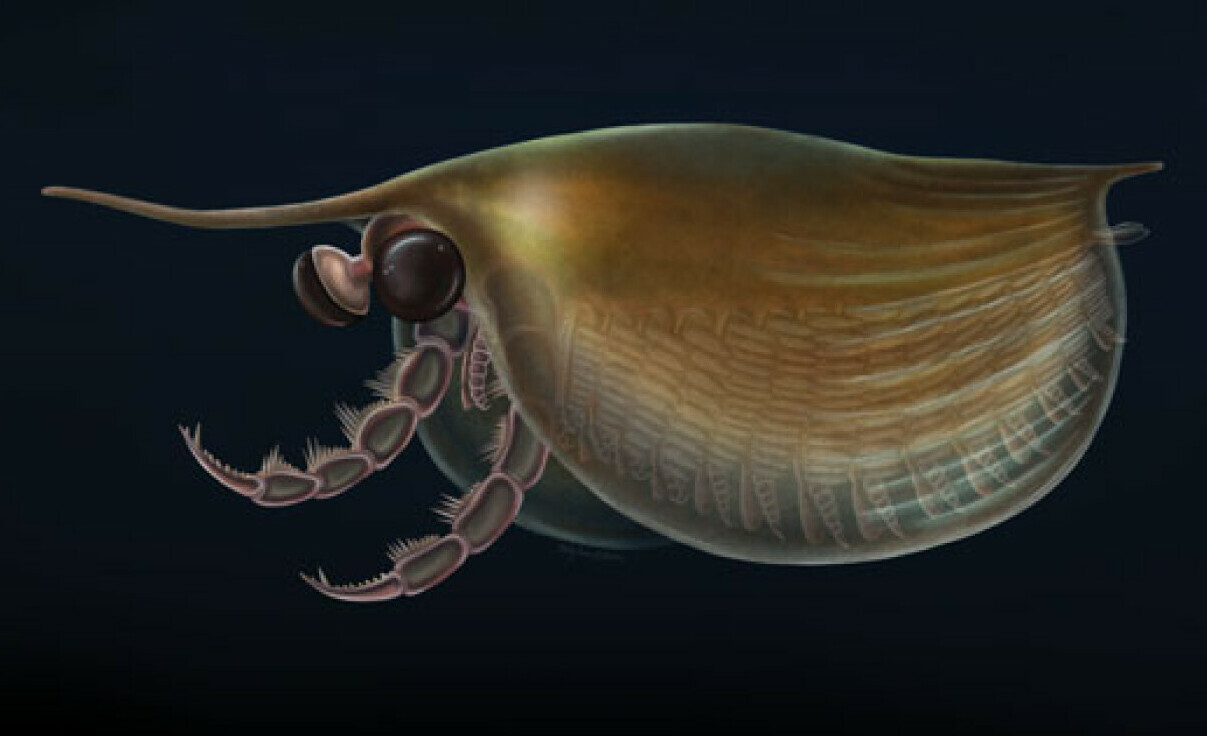
- Isoxys curvirostratus from the Chengjiang Biota
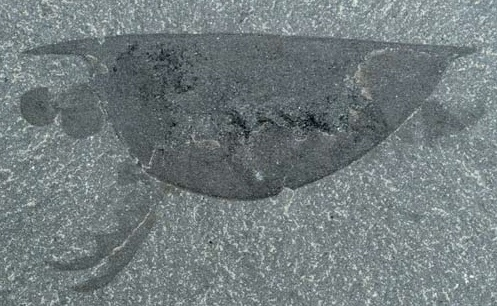
- Fossil of Isoxys acutangulus from the Burgess Shale

Scientific classification
- Kingdom: Animalia
- Phylum: Arthropoda
- Order: †Isoxyida
- Family: †Isoxyidae
- Genus: †Isoxys; Walcott, 1890

Type species
- Isoxys chilhoweanus Walcott, 1890

Species
- See text

= Isoxys =

Isoxys Temporal range: Cambrian Stage 2 to Paibian Possible early Ordovician record

Genus of extinct arthropods

Isoxys (meaning "equal surfaces") is a genus of extinct bivalved Cambrian arthropod; the various species of which are thought to have been freely swimming predators. It had a pair of large spherical eyes (which are the most commonly preserved feature of the soft-bodied anatomy), and two large frontal appendages used to grasp prey.

== Description ==
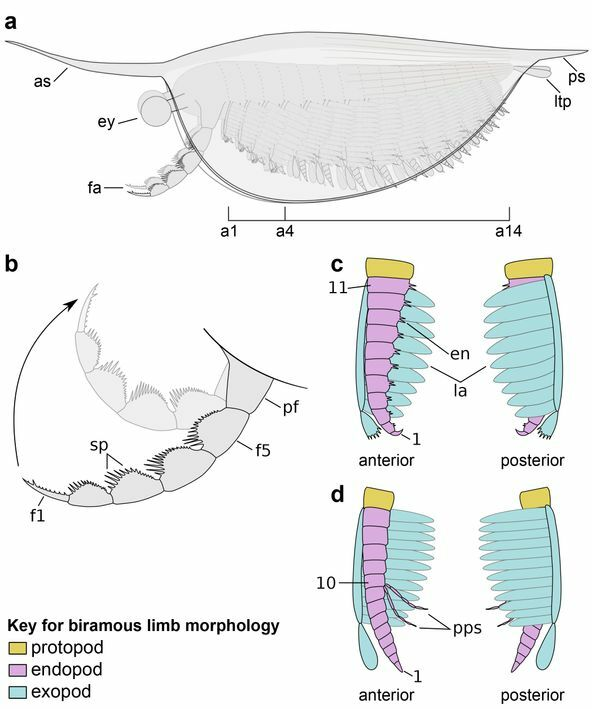
Diagram of I. curvirostratus showing frontal (b) and biramous appendages (c,d) (c) and (d) represent first four limb pairs and remaining posterior limbs, respectively

Species of Isoxys have roughly semicircular bivalved carapaces, which vary in morphology between species. The front and rear edges of the carapaces bear forward and posterior facing spines, respectively which in some species are greatly elongated. The carapaces of Isoxys are typically 1.1 to 3.3 centimetres (0.43 to 1.30 in) in length (with the juveniles of some species being as small as 0.5 centimetres (0.20 in)), excluding the spines, though some species are known to reach over 6 centimetres (2.4 in). In long-spined species when including spine length, some specimens exceed 10 centimetres (3.9 in). The possible species Isoxys? giganteus has a carapace length including the spines of 33.4 centimetres (13.1 in). The opening angle of the carapace was close to vertical, giving it a narrow profile when viewed from above.

The head had a pair of large spherical stalked eyes, as well as a pair of upward-curling frontal appendages, which have a varying number of podomeres/segments, depending on the species. Most podomeres on the frontal appendages have upward-facing endite spines, with the number and placement of spines varying between species. The last podomere of the frontal appendage is a curved terminal claw.

The trunk lacks clear segmentation (arthrodization). Along the body are pairs of biramous (divided into two parts) appendages, the counts of which differ between species (Isoxys curvirostratus has 14, while Isoxys auritus has 11). In Isoxys curvirostratus the endopods (the inner, leg-like parts of the biramous limbs/appendages) have well defined segments/podomeres. The first four biramous limb pairs of Isoxys curvirostratus were shorter than the remaining pairs, with their endopods having borne well developed endite (inward facing) spines and ended with a curved subchela (claw), with these features absent in the endopods of the more posterior limbs. The exopods (outer part of the biramous limbs) of Isoxys curvirostratus had thick paddle-shaped lamellae which projected perpendicular to the limb axis. Isoxys volucris from Greenland had paddle-shaped exopods suggested to have been fringed with setae. The end of the trunk has paired telson flaps.

== Ecology ==
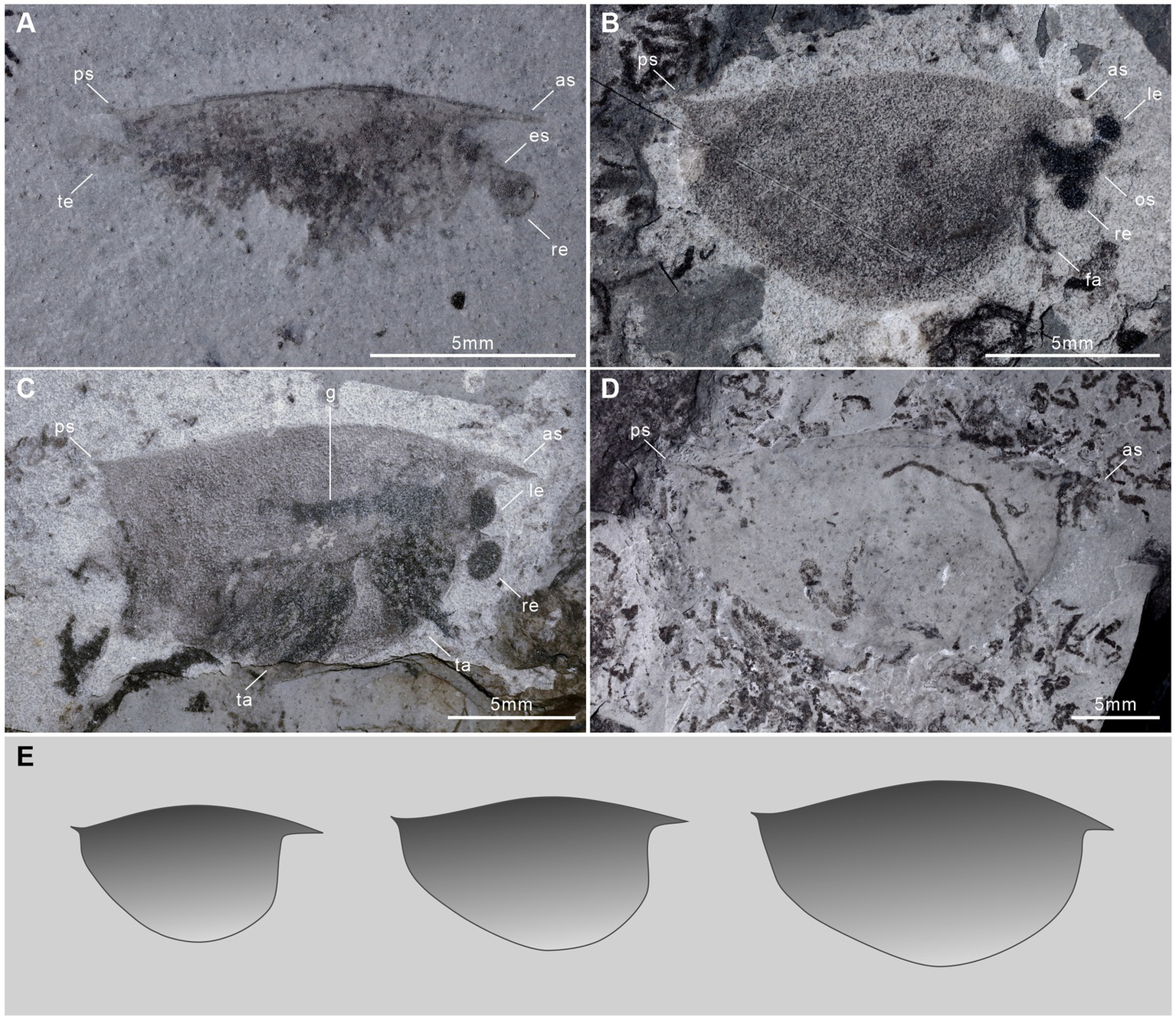
Growth series of Isoxys minor

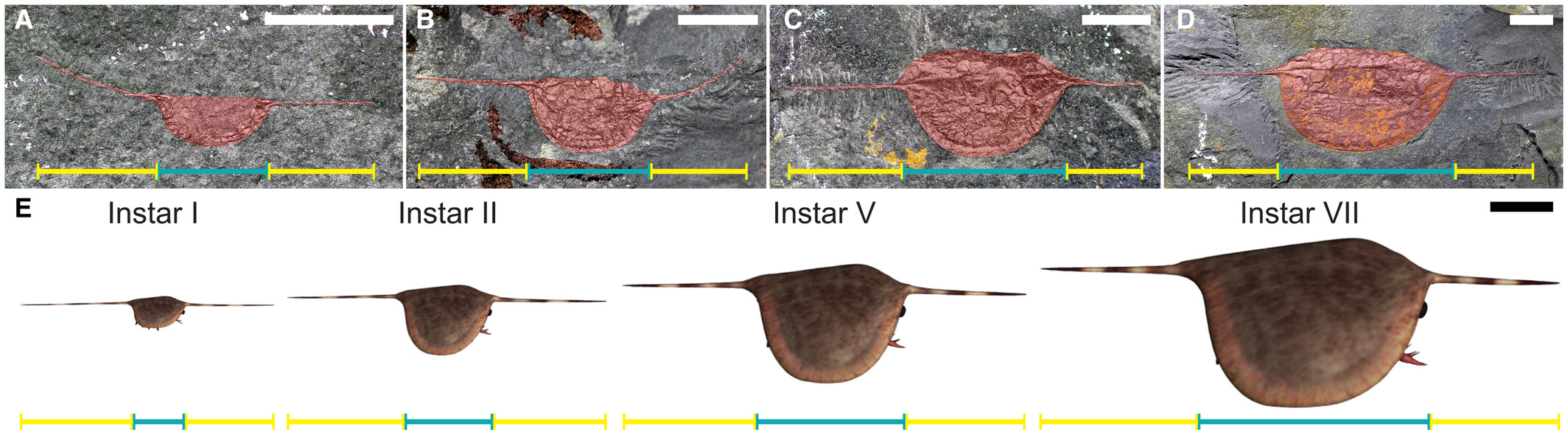
Growth series of Isoxys volucris

Species of Isoxys are thought to have been actively swimming predators, using its frontal appendages to capture soft-bodied prey (which was often small enough to qualify as zooplankton), with the frontalmost pairs of biramous limbs aiding in food processing. The various Isoxys species are thought to have occupied a variety of niches, from swimming just above the seafloor (nektobenthic) to open ocean swimmers (pelagic). Swimming was likely accomplished by rhythmic movement of the legs.

It has been proposed that Isoxys species with elongated carapace spines underwent diel vertical migration, cyclically rising and sinking down the water column over the course of the day and night, like many modern marine invertebrates. The elongate carapace spines, particularly the forward-facing ones, are thought to have improved hydrodynamic lift, as well as possibly serving as a defense against predators. Some pelagic Isoxys species qualified as being zooplankton. Isoxys species lacked a distinct planktic larval stage. At least some Isoxys species carapace morphology changed between juveniles and adults, which likely improved their hydrodynamic efficiency, with the forward and backward facing-spines of Isoxys volucris becoming proportionally shorter over the course of growth.

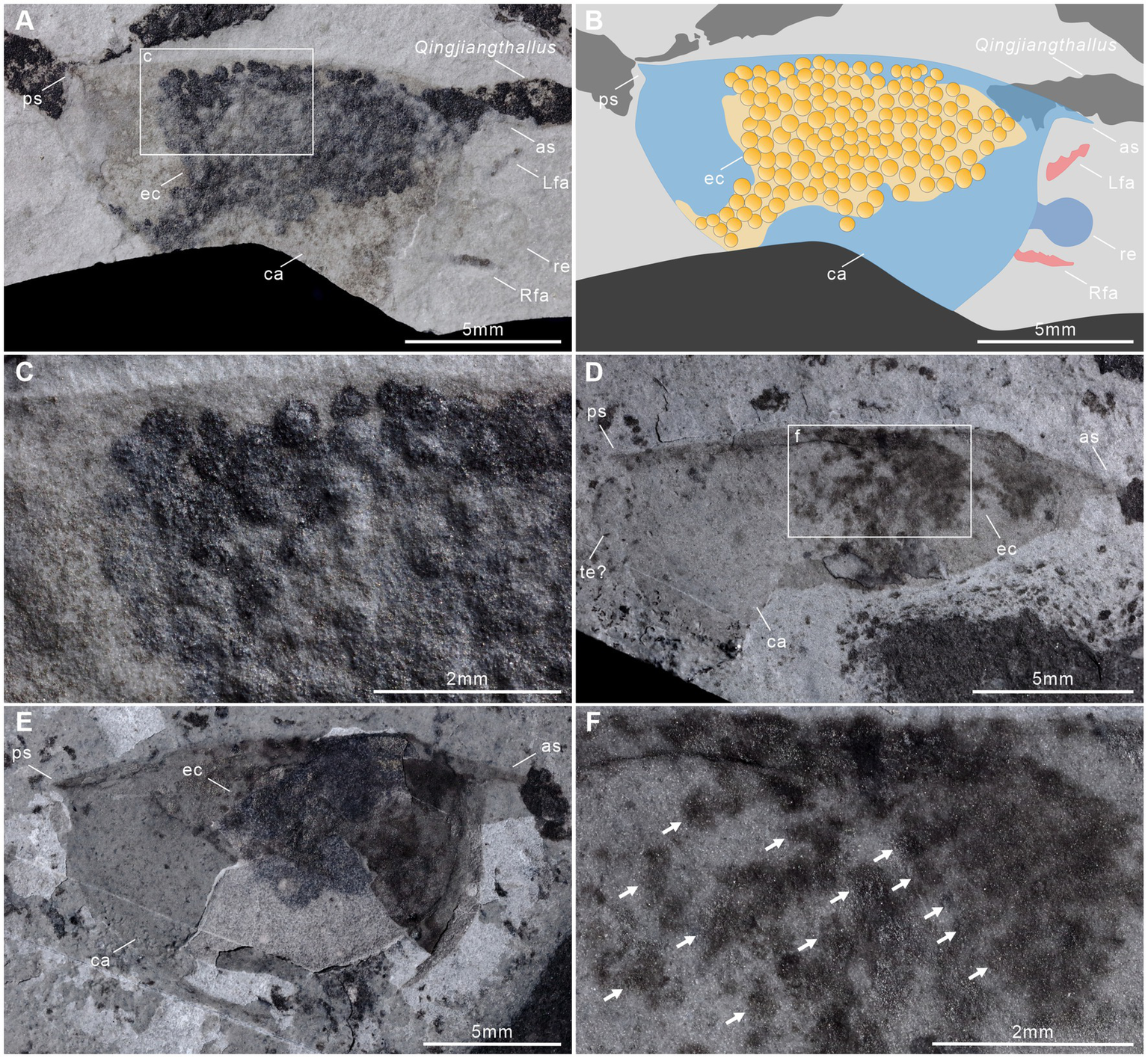
Fossils of Isoxys minor with preserved eggs that were being brooded inside the carapace.

Eyes of different specimens appear to have been adapted to different light intensities; A 2010 study suggested that one specimen of I. auritus was either crepuscular in shallow water, or lived in waters around 140 m below the sea surface; whereas another was morphologically adapted to a diurnal light intensity in shallow waters. Specimens of Isoxys minor have been found with eggs adhered to the inner surface of the carapace, indicating they engaged in brood care. The brood size was large, with approximately 300 eggs, each 0.5 millimetres (3/128 in) across per (presumably female) individual. Egg bearing individuals were only around half the maximum size, suggesting that individuals continued to grow beyond sexual maturity.

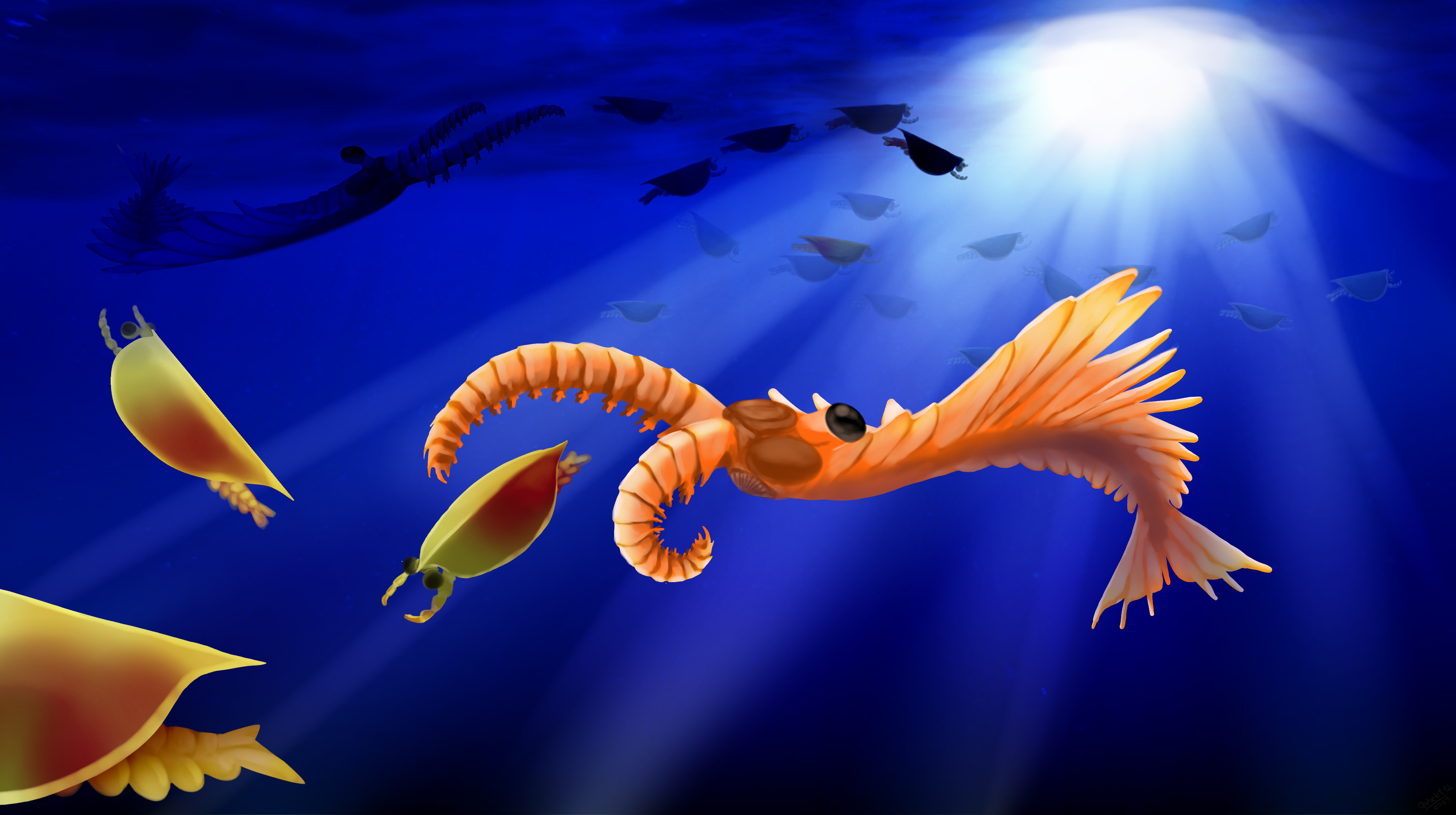
Illustration of Isoxys acutangulus being hunted by the radiodont Anomalocaris

Species of Isoxys were preyed upon by other animals. Carapaces of the Sirius Passet species Isoxys volucris have been frequently found as stomach contents of the giant stem-chaetognath (arrow worm) Timorebestia, with this species also found as stomach contents of a Sidneyia-like arthropod known from the same deposit. Likely coprolites (fossilised feces) found in Chengjiang biota deposits containing Isoxys carapaces are suggested to have been produced by radiodonts.

== Taxonomy ==
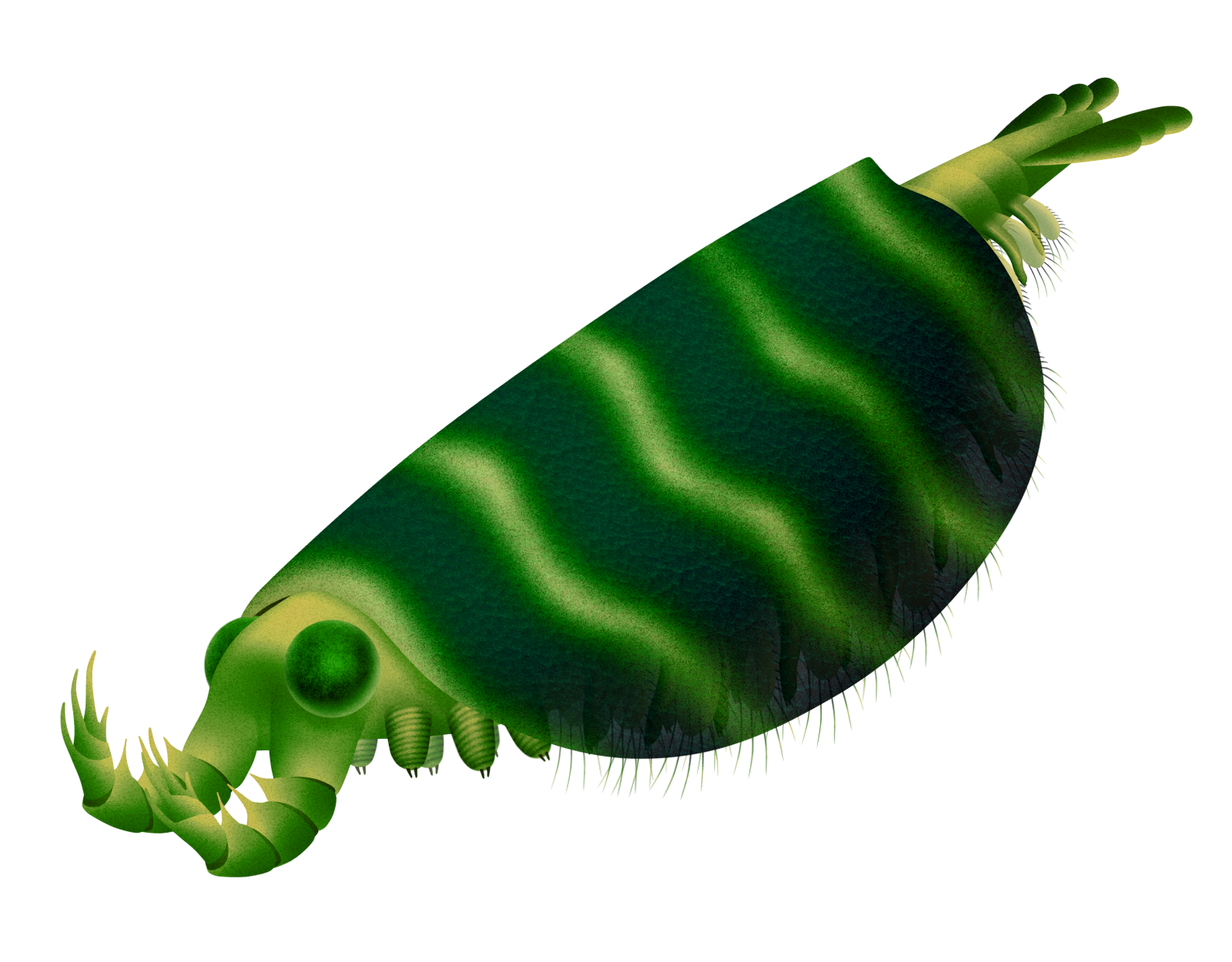
Life restoration of Surusicaris, which has been widely suggested to be closely related to Isoxys

Life restoration of Sunella, another taxon which has been suggested as a close relative of Isoxys in some studies, but detailed analysis has suggested it to be distantly related and a crustacean instead

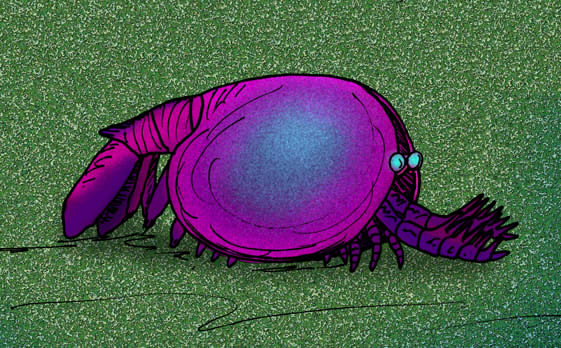
Life restoration of Occacaris, a "great appendage bivalved arthropod", suggested as a close related of isoxyids or even nested within Isoxyidae in some studies

Isoxys is generally thought to belong to the arthropod stem-group (implying that Isoxys is less closely related to living arthropods than all living arthropods are to each other) as part of the clade Deuteropoda, as Isoxys shows a combination of traits characteristic of more primitive stem-group arthropods like radiodonts, like lacking an arthrodized (sclerotized and jointed) trunk exoskeleton, along with those of modern arthropods, like possessing sclerotized and jointed (arthropodized) biramous limbs. It is one of two genera confidently placed within the family Isoxyidae, alongside Surusicaris. Some phylogenies have alternately supported a position within the arthropod crown group (the least inclusive group including the most recent ancestor of living arthropods and all of its descendants), more closely related to Artiopoda (trilobites and kin) and Mandibulata (millipedes, centipedes, crustaceans, insects, etc) than to Chelicerata (which includes arachnids, sea spiders and horseshoe crabs). The family Sunellidae, which also has bivalved carapace, and as revealed in 2026 study, similar upward curling frontward appendages (at least in Sunella) has also been posited as a close relative of the isoxyids, though a 2026 study found that they were more basal, and that isoxyids were more closely related to living arthropods, suggesting their similar bivalved carapaces may have been a shared ancestral trait and that the ancestor of all living arthropods had a similar carapace. The segmented nature of the trunk of Sunella also suggests that the lack of arthrodized trunk segmentation of Isoxys is a secondary loss than a retained ancestral trait. However a later 2026 study found Sunella to be a pancrustacean related to ostracods. The poorly known "great appendage bivalved arthropods" Forfexicaris and Occacaris have also been suggested as close relatives or even nested within Isoxyidae in some studies. A close relationship to the bivalved arthropod Tuzoia had historically been proposed based on the similarities of some aspects of their carapaces, but preserved soft tissues of Tuzoia described in 2022 suggest that they are not closely related.

Cladogram after Liu et al. 2026:

- Panarthropoda
  - † "Lobopodia" (paraphyletic, ancestral to tardigrades, onychophorans and arthropods)
  - Total group Euarthropoda
    - †Megadictyon
    - - - †Kerygmachela
        - - †Pambdelurion
          - - †Opabiniidae
            - - † Radiodonta (e.g Anomalocaris)
              - Deuteropoda
                - †Erratus
                - - †Sunella
                  - - †Isoxyidae
                      - - Isoxys auritus
                        - Isoxys volucris
                      - - - Isoxys curvirostratus
                          - Isoxys acutangulus
                        - - Surusicaris
                          - "Great appendage bivalved forms"
                            - Occacaris
                            - Forfexicaris
                    - - - †Fengzhengia
                        - †Kylinxia
                      - - †Megacheira
                        - Pan-Chelicerata
                      - - †Kiisortoqia
                        - †Bushizheia
                        - Antennulata
                          - †Artiopoda (including Trilobita)
                          - Mandibulata
                            - †Fuxianhuiida
                            - - †Hymenocarina
                              - - Myriapoda
                                - Pancrustacea

=== Species and evolution ===
Isoxys first appeared early in Cambrian Stage 3, around 521 million years ago, around the same time as trilobites. Early species like Isoxys carbonelli and I. zhurensis generally had a body length less 1.5 centimetres (0.59 in) as adults, and lived in shallow marine carbonate environments.

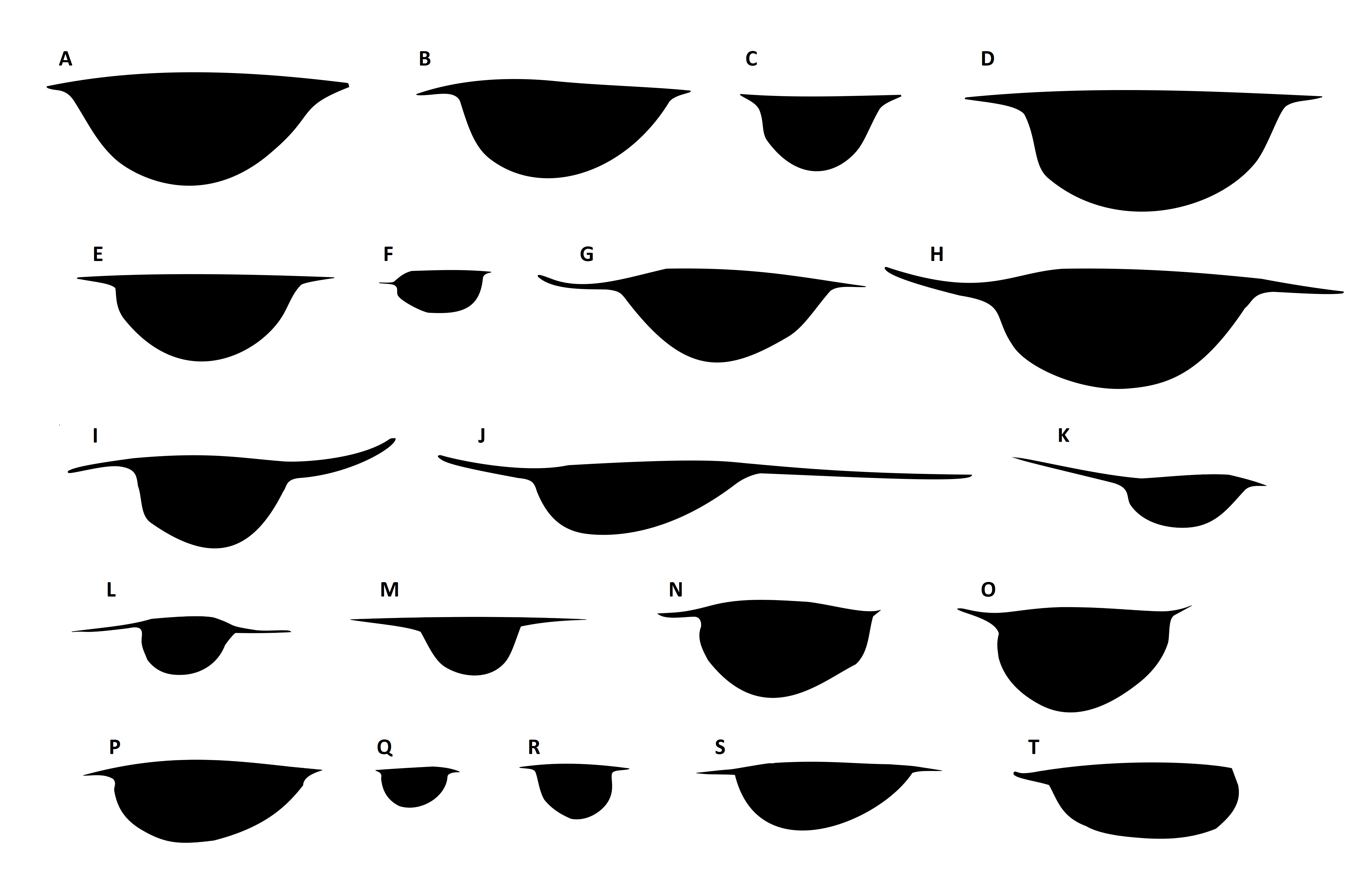
Carapaces of various Isoxys species: A: I. chilhoweanus B: I. acutangulus C: I. zhurensis D: I. auritus E: I. glaessneri F: I. carbonelli G: I. curvirostratus H: I. communis I: I. wudingaspis J: I. longissimus K: I. paradoxus L: I. volucris M: I. bispinatus N: I. minor O: I. guanduensis P: I. shandongensis Q: I. globulus R: I. jianheensis S: I. mackenziensis T: I. granulus Front of the carapace faces towards the left

20 species of Isoxys have been described, which have a global distribution, having been found in North America, Siberia, Australia, China and Europe, spanning from Cambrian Series 2 into the Miaolingian.

- Isoxys chilhoweanus Walcott, 1890 (type) Tennessee, USA, Cambrian Series 2
- Isoxys acutangulus (Walcott, 1908) Balang Formation, Guizhou, China, Cambrian Stage 4, Burgess Shale, Canada, Miaolingian
- Isoxys auritus (Jiang, 1982) Chengjiang Biota, Yunnan, China, Cambrian Stage 3, Balang Formation, China, Cambrian Stage 4
- Isoxys curvirostratus Vannier & Chen, 2000 Chengjiang Biota, China, Cambrian Stage 3
- Isoxys paradoxus Hou, 1987 Chengjiang Biota, China, Cambrian Stage 3
- Isoxys zhurensis Ivantsov, 1990 Sinsk Formation, Siberia, Cambrian Series 2
- Isoxys bispinatus Cui, 1991 Shuijintuo Formation, Sichuan, China, Cambrian Series 2
- Isoxys glaessneri García−Bellido, Paterson, Edgecombe, Jago, Gehling & Lee, 2009 Emu Bay Shale, Australia, Cambrian Stage 4
- Isoxys communis Glaessner, 1979 Emu Bay Shale, Australia, Cambrian Stage 4
- Isoxys guanduensis Wang et al., 2012 Guanshan Biota, Yunnan, China, Cambrian Stage 4
- Isoxys minor Luo et al., 2008 Guanshan Biota, Yunnan, China, Cambrian Stage 4
- Isoxys wudingensis Luo & Hu, 2006 Guanshan Biota, Yunnan, China, Cambrian Stage 4
- Isoxys globulus Liu et al., 2018 Balang Formation, Guizhou, China, Cambrian Stage 4
- Isoxys jianheensis Liu et al., 2018 Balang Formation, Guizhou, China, Cambrian Stage 4
- Isoxys volucris Williams, Siveter & Peel, 1996, Sirius Passet, Greenland, Cambrian Stage 3
- Isoxys mackenziensis Kimmig & Pratt 2015 Rockslide Formation, Canada, Miaolingian
- Isoxys longissimus Simonetta & Delle Cave, 1975 Burgess Shale, Canada, Miaolingian
- Isoxys carbonelli Richter & Richter, 1927, Pedroche Formation, Spain, Cambrian Series 2
- Isoxys shandongensis Wang and Huang, 2010, Mantou Formation, Shandong, China, Miaolingian

Indeterminate species are also known from the Spence Shale of Utah, dating to the Miaolingian, as well as the Kaili Biota in Guizhou, China, which also dates to the Miaolingian. Isoxys? giganteus Yoshino and Oji, 2026 is known from the Early Ordovician (Tremadocian) Fezouata Formation of Morocco. If its identification as a species of Isoxys is correct, it would be the latest surviving species of the genus and of the isoxyids by 20 million years. However, due to it only being known from the carapace and not soft tissues, its identity as an isoxyid is equivocal, and could potentially represent a P-element (lateral head sclerite) from a radiodont instead.

== See also ==
- Arthropod
- Cambrian explosion
- Chengjiang biota
  - List of Chengjiang Biota species by phylum
- Paleobiota of the Burgess Shale
- Clam Shrimp
