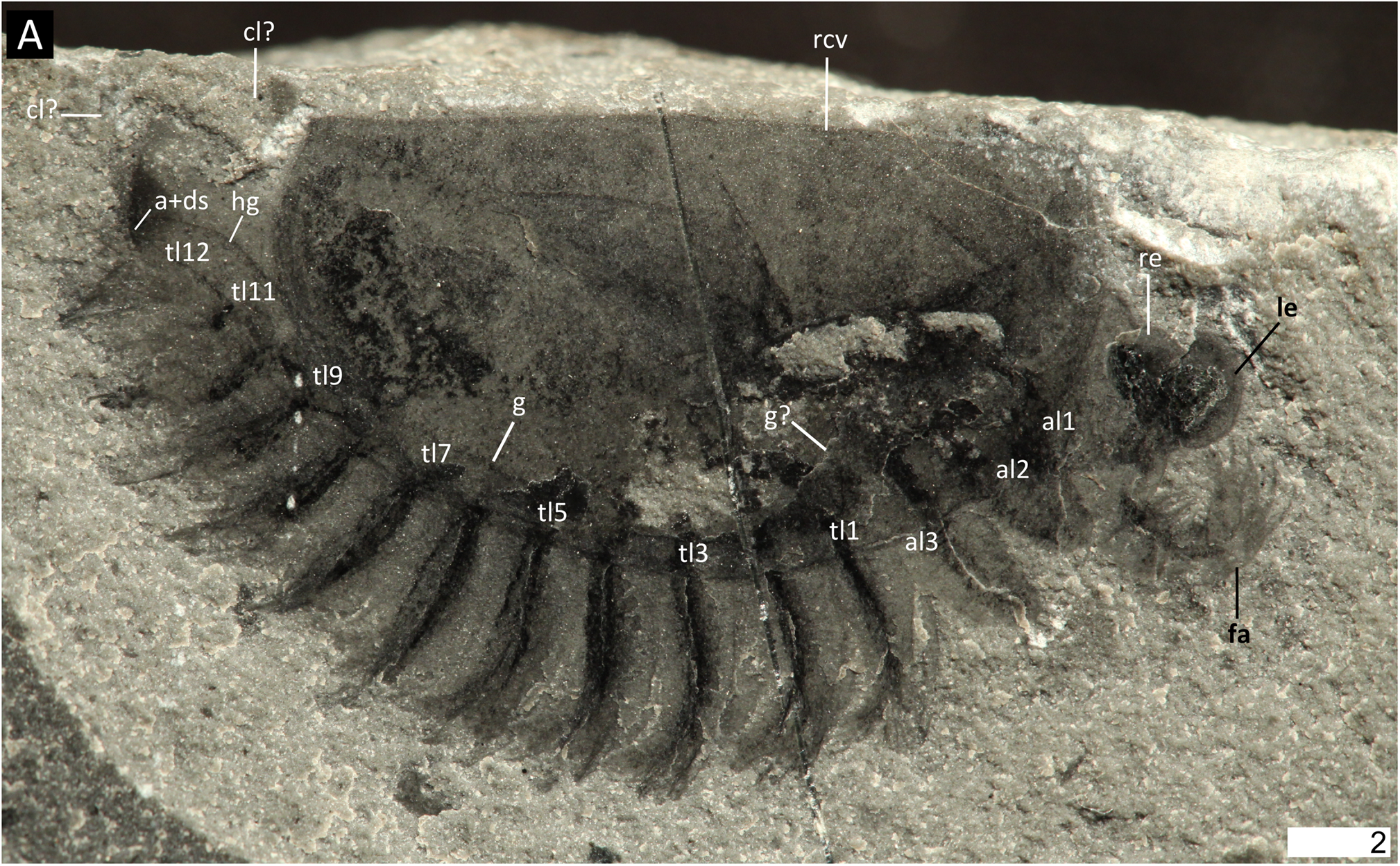
- Holotype and only known specimen
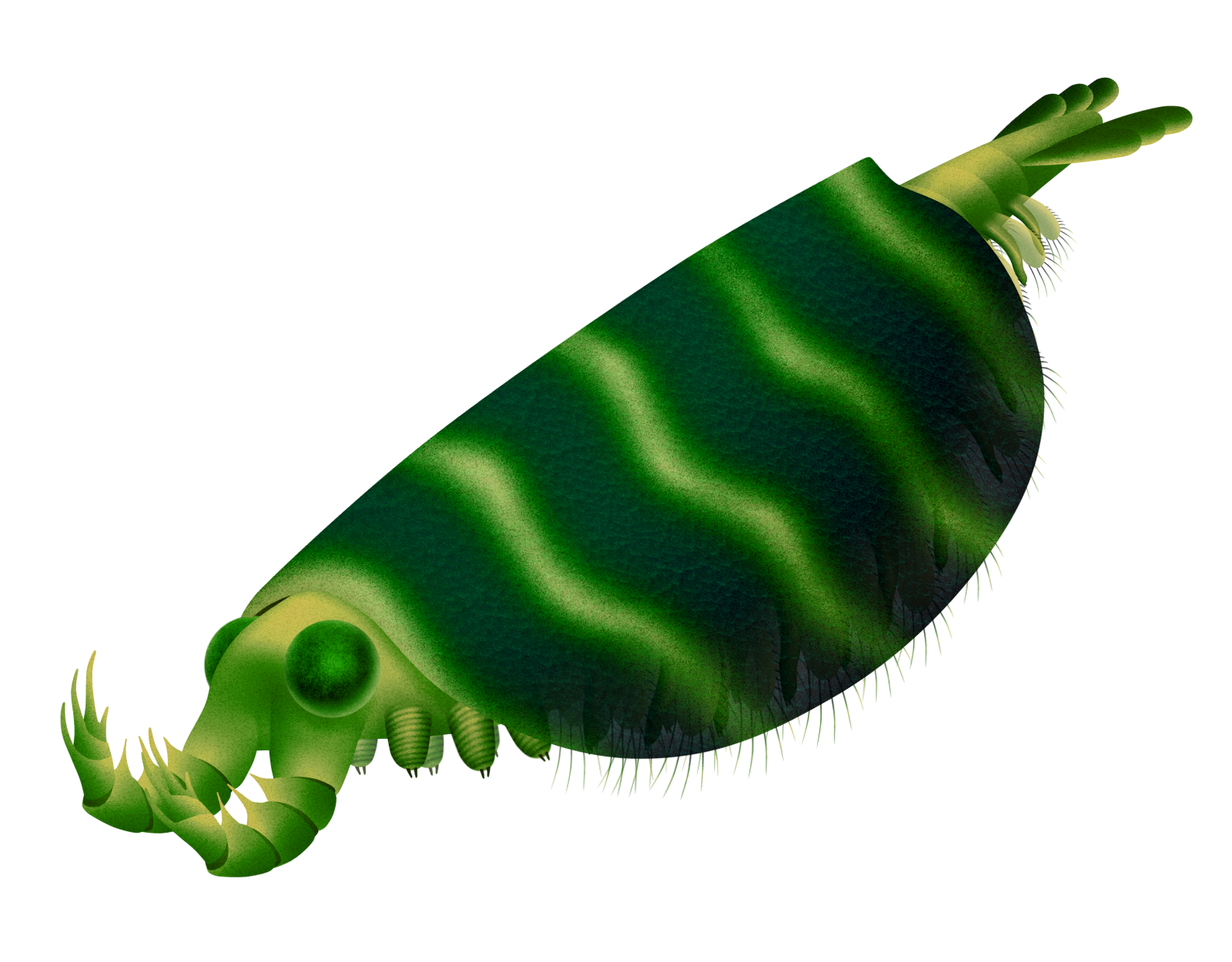
- Life restoration

Scientific classification
- Kingdom: Animalia
- Phylum: Arthropoda
- Order: †Isoxyida
- Family: †Isoxyidae
- Genus: †Surusicaris; Aria and Caron, 2015

Type species
- Surusicaris elegans Aria and Caron, 2015

= Surusicaris =

Surusicaris Temporal range: Miaolingian

Extinct genus of bivalved arthropod

Surusicaris is an extinct genus of isoxyid bivalved arthropod, known from the Cambrian Burgess Shale of British Columbia, Canada. It is monotypic, containing a single species, Surusicaris elegans. It is considered to be closely related to Isoxys, and like it has spined grasping frontal appendages.

== Description ==
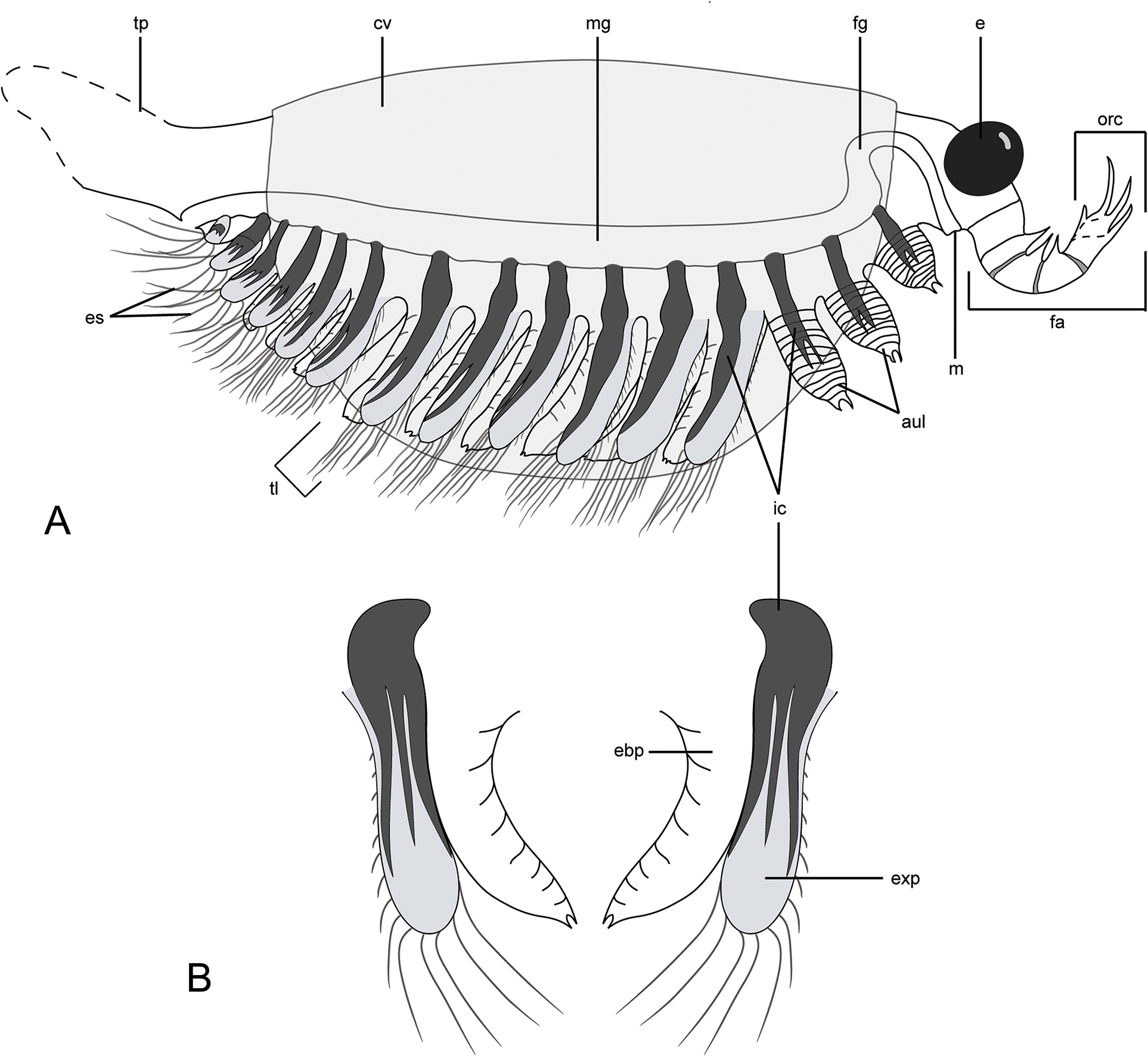
Diagram

The only known specimen (ROM 62976), has a roughly semicircular bivalved carapace, which is approximately 1.49 centimetres (0.59 in) long and 0.89 centimetres (0.35 in) tall. The head has a pair of rounded eyes, and a pair of upward-curling segmented frontal appendages with at least five segments, the second, third and fourth of which bear a spine, with three long spines and at least one short spine on the fifth and terminal segment. The head also has three pairs of other limbs, which are stubby, uniramous (single-part) and unsclerotized, with an annulated appearance, which are tipped with bifid claws. Along the trunk are 12 pairs of biramous (two-branched) limbs, which taper in size posteriorly. Their morphology is simple, the morphology of the endopod (the inner, leg-like limb branch) is similar to those of the three uniramous head limbs, while the exopod (the outer limb branch) is sub-lobate, elongate, and possibly flattened, with marginal setae (hair-like structures) and about the same length as the endopod. The posterior is poorly preserved but may be a tail-piece formed by two lobes or a fan.

== Taxonomy and ecology ==
Surusicaris has been placed as a member of Isoxyida and Isoxyidae, both of which contain only one other genus, Isoxys. Isoxyids are considered to be basal stem-group arthropods. Isoxyids are thought to have been actively swimming predators.

== See also ==
- Paleobiota of the Burgess Shale
