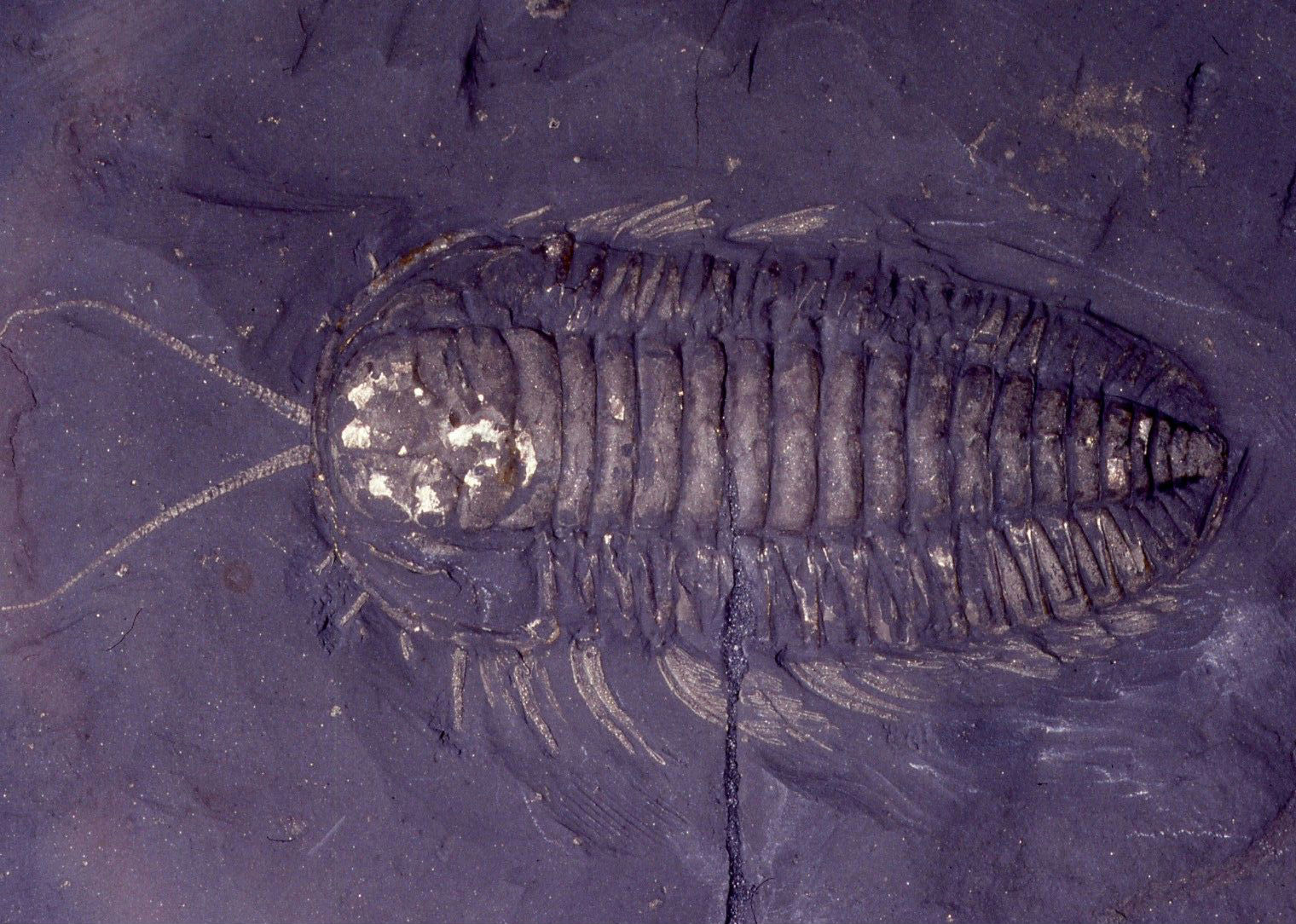
- Fossil of Triarthrus eatoni, a trilobite
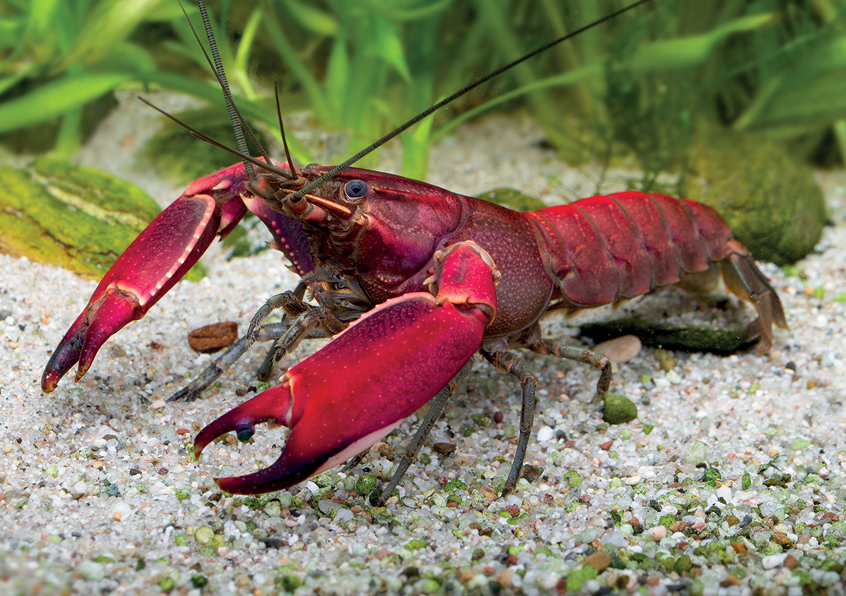
- Cherax wagenknechtae, a crustacean mandibulate

Scientific classification
- Kingdom: Animalia
- Phylum: Arthropoda
- Clade: Deuteropoda
- (unranked): Antennulata

Subgroups
- †Artiopoda; †Marrellomorpha?; Mandibulata; †Burgessia?

= Antennulata =

Antennulata Temporal range: Cambrian–Recent

Proposed clade of arthropods

Antennulata is a proposed clade of arthropods comprising Artiopoda (Trilobites and their close relatives), Marrellomorpha and Mandibulata (crustaceans, hexapods and myriapods). As its name suggests, a proposed unifying feature of the clade is the presence of antennulae. It contrasts with the opposing Arachnomorpha hypothesis, which instead posits that artiopods and marrellomorphs are more closely related to Chelicerates.
