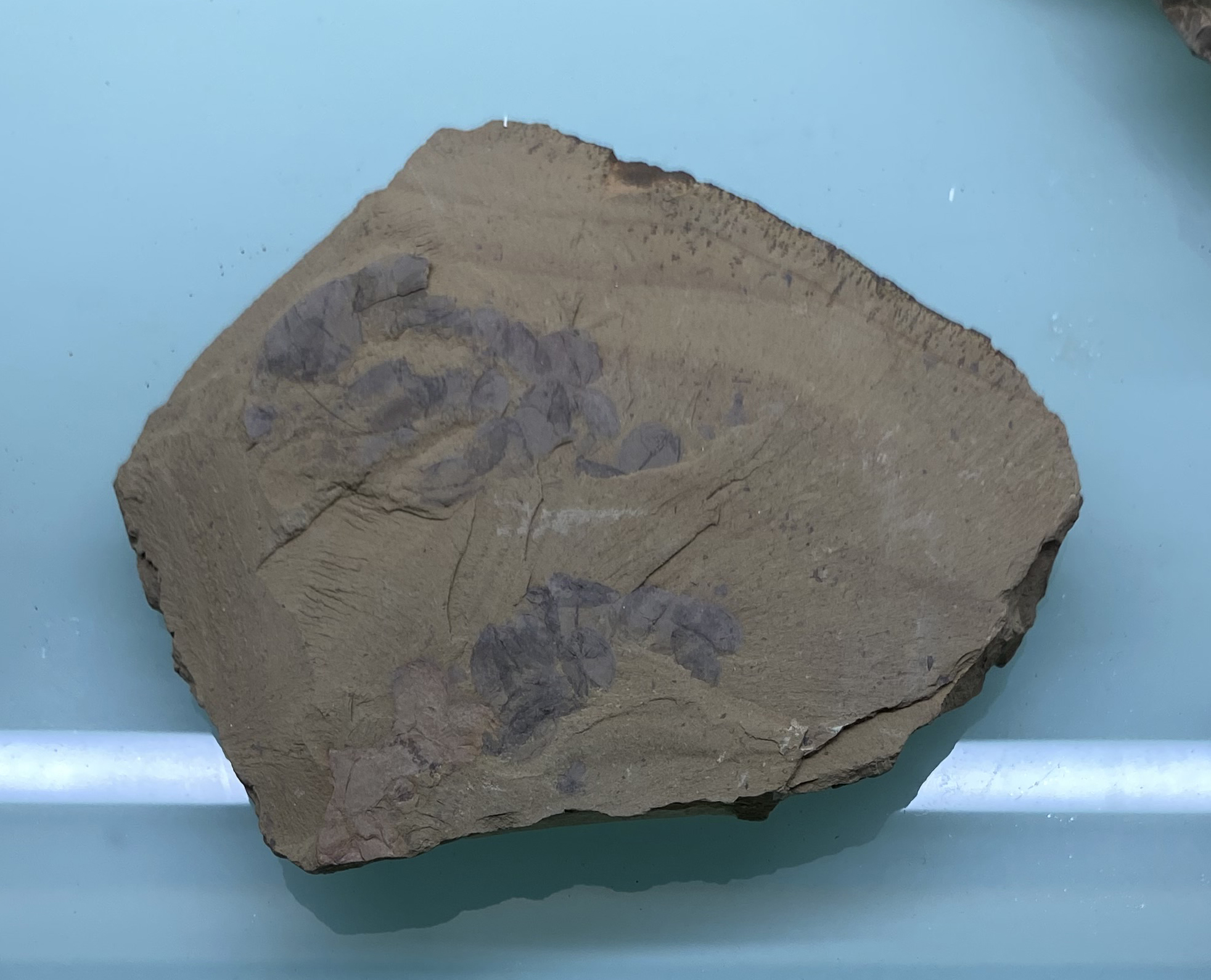
- Fossil of Combinivalvula chengjiangensis in Yuxi Museum

Scientific classification
- Kingdom: Animalia
- Phylum: Arthropoda
- Family: †Sunellidae
- Genus: †Combinivalvula; Hou, 1987
- Species: †C. chengjiangensis

Binomial name
- †Combinivalvula chengjiangensis Hou, 1987

= Combinivalvula =

Combinivalvula Temporal range: Early Cambrian–Mid Cambrian

Genus of arthropod

Combinivalvula is a genus of Cambrian sunellid arthropod from the Chengjiang biota. It was described in 1987.
