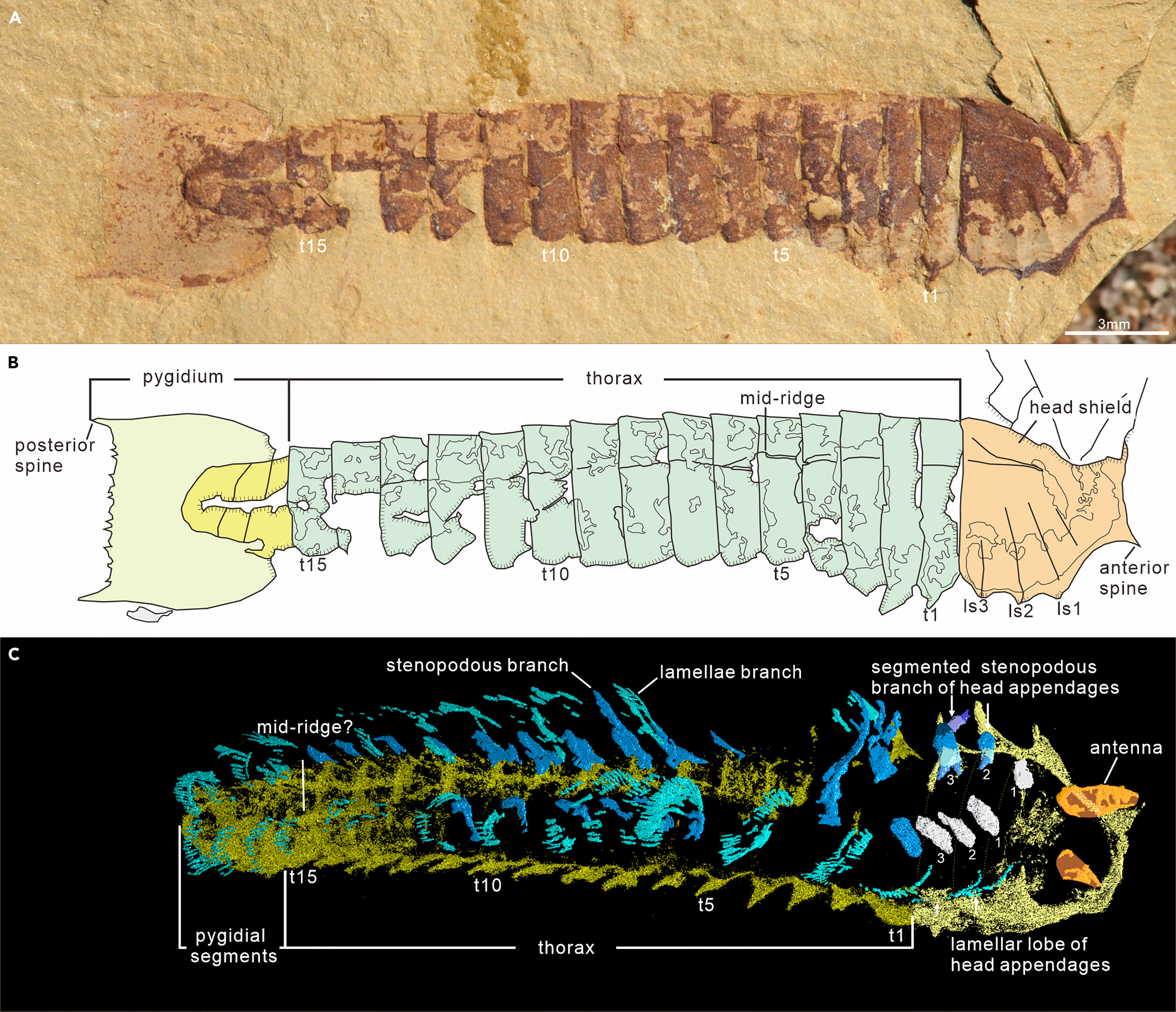
- Fossil specimen with preserved appendages
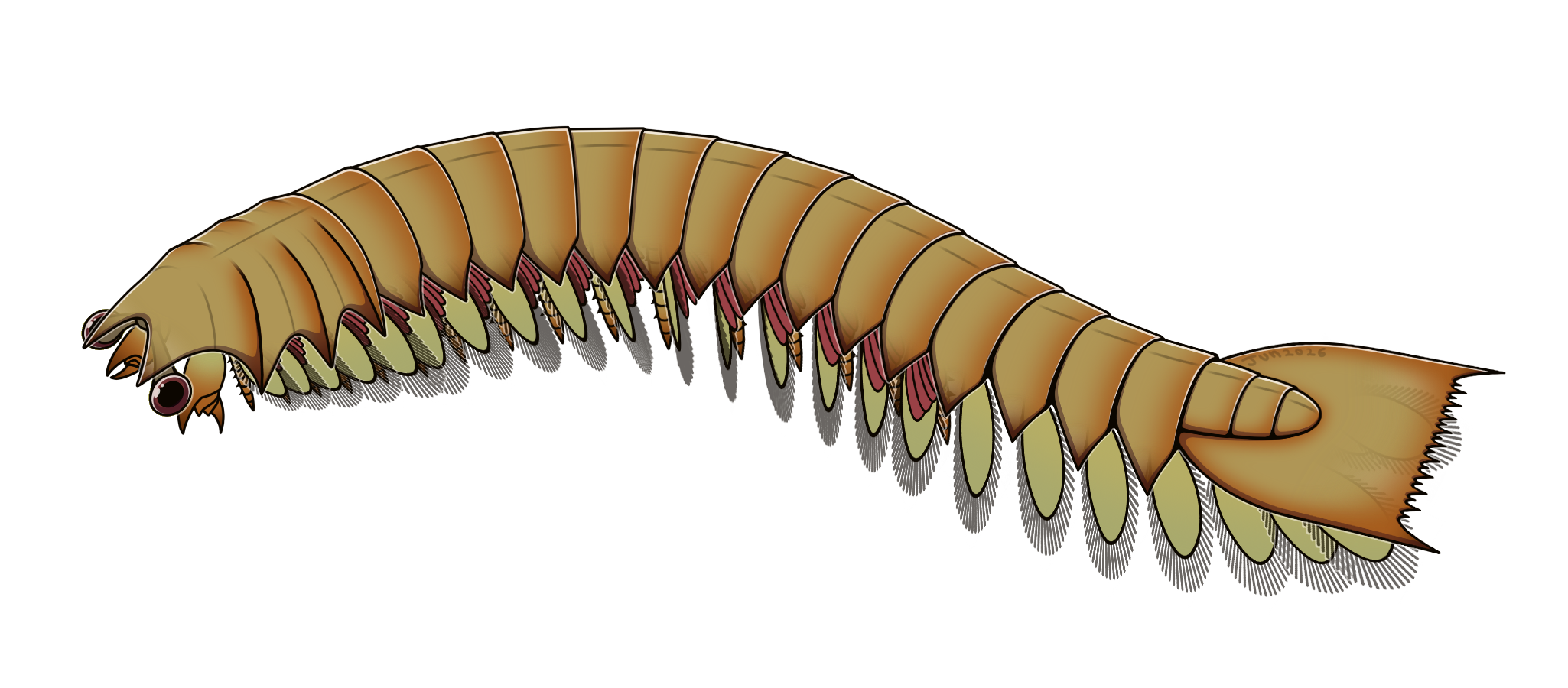
- Life restoration after study published in 2026

Scientific classification
- Kingdom: Animalia
- Phylum: Arthropoda
- Clade: Deuteropoda
- Genus: †Urokodia; Hou et al, 1989

Type species
- Urokodia aequalis Hou et al, 1989

= Urokodia =

Urokodia Temporal range: 518 Ma

Extinct genus of arthropod

Urokodia is an extinct genus of marine arthropod from the early Cambrian. The only known species is Urokodia aequalis from the Maotianshan Shales of China based on some 15 specimens.

== Description ==
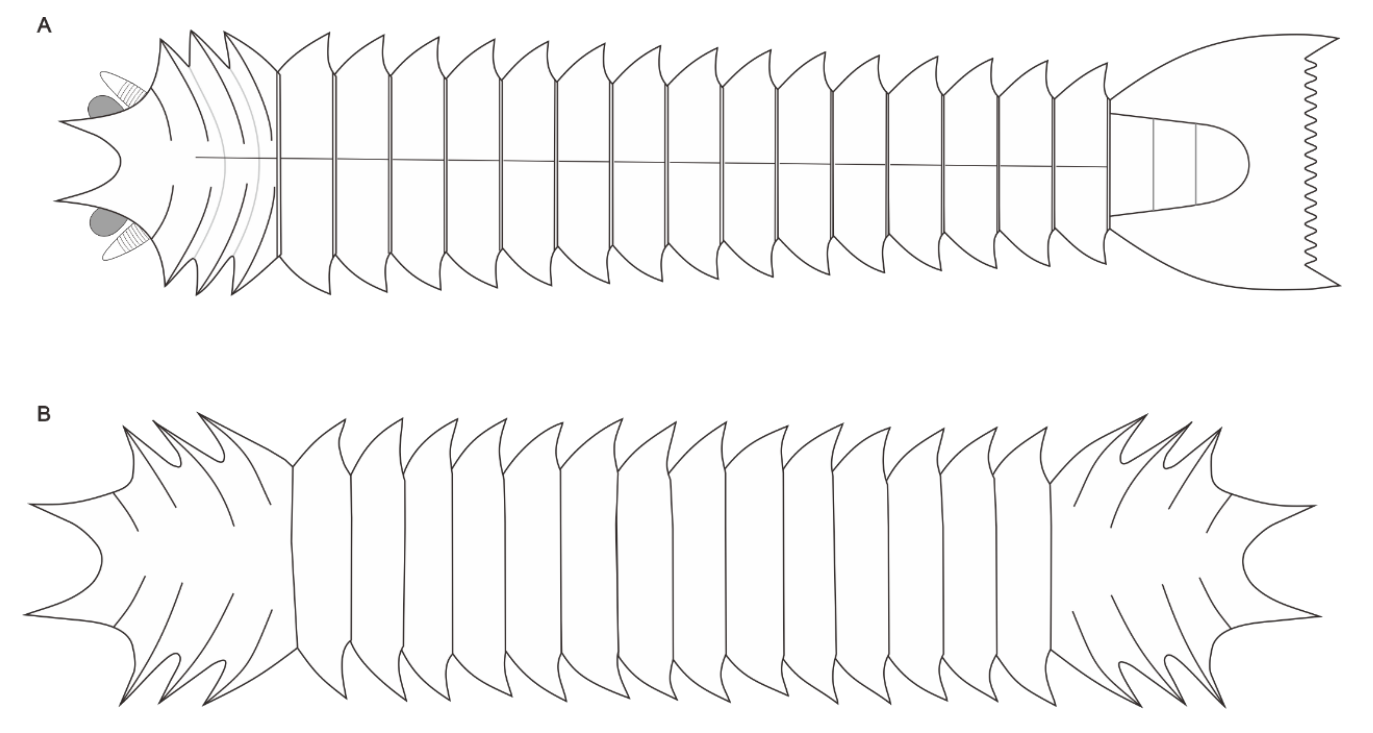
Recent (A) and previous (B) reconstructions from Liu et al. 2024

Urokodia is an elongated arthropod measuring up to 3.5 cm. The dorsal exoskeleton (tergite) is composed of a cephalon (head) and a pygidium (tail shield) of subequal size. Both were initially thought to be nearly identical, possessing 4 pairs of large lateral spikes. However, subsequent studies revealed that the pygidium had a distinct triangular shape and a parallel row of tiny posterior spikes. Between the cephalon and pygidium was an elongated thorax of 14 or 15 segments. It possesses a pair of stalked eyes.

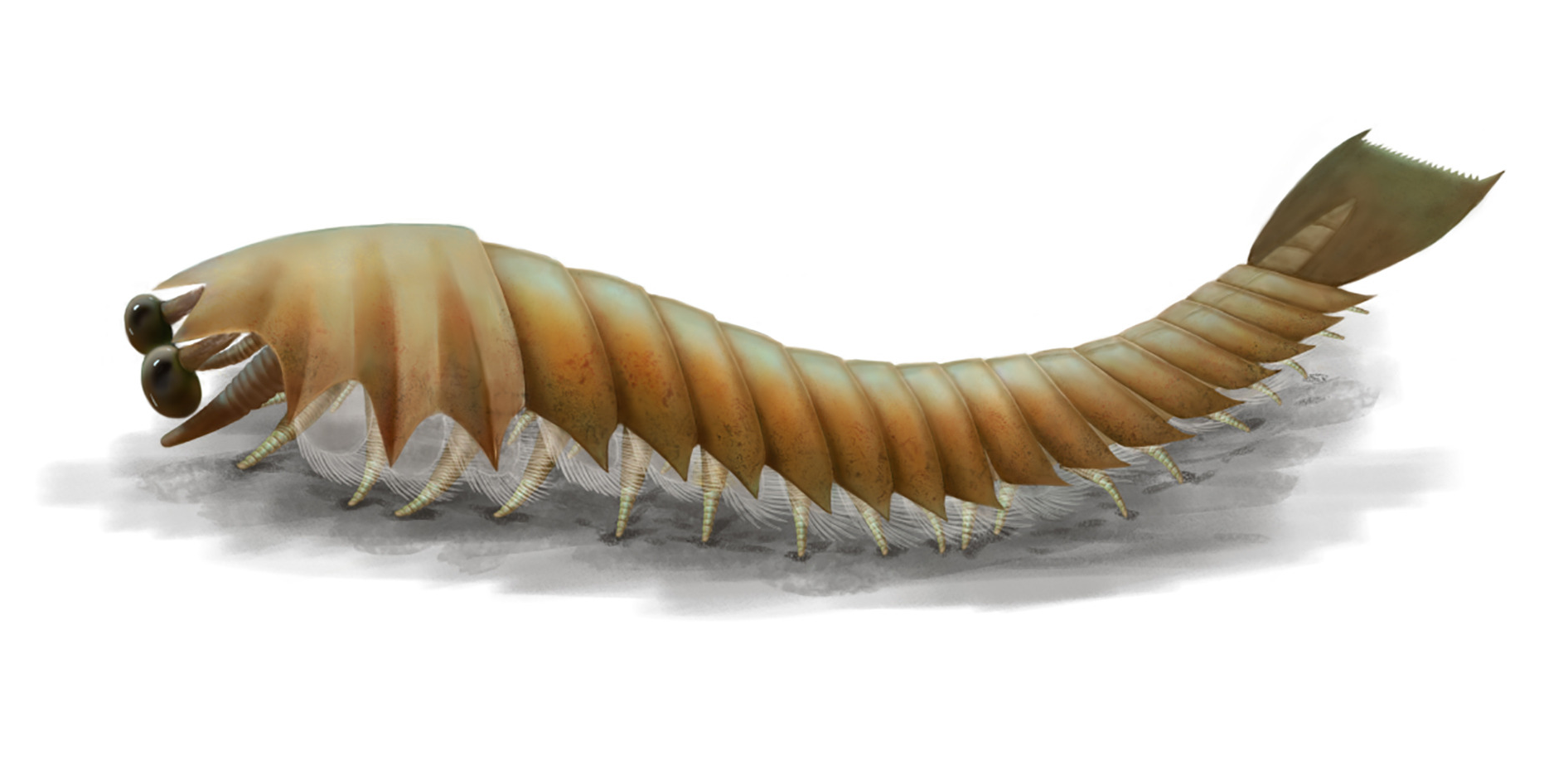
Life reconstruction from Liu et al. 2024

The interpretation of ventral structures other than the eyes differ between redescriptions from two different research teams. Liu et al. 2024 interpreted the first appendages as a pair of stubby antennae. The remaining ventral region possesses subequal appendages with lamellar exopods (lobe-like outer branches), 3 pairs under both the cephalon and pygidium and 1 pair under each thoracic segment. All but the pygidial appendages are biramous (two-branched), bearing annulated basipods (limb bases) and segmented, stenopodous endopods (leg-like inner branches).

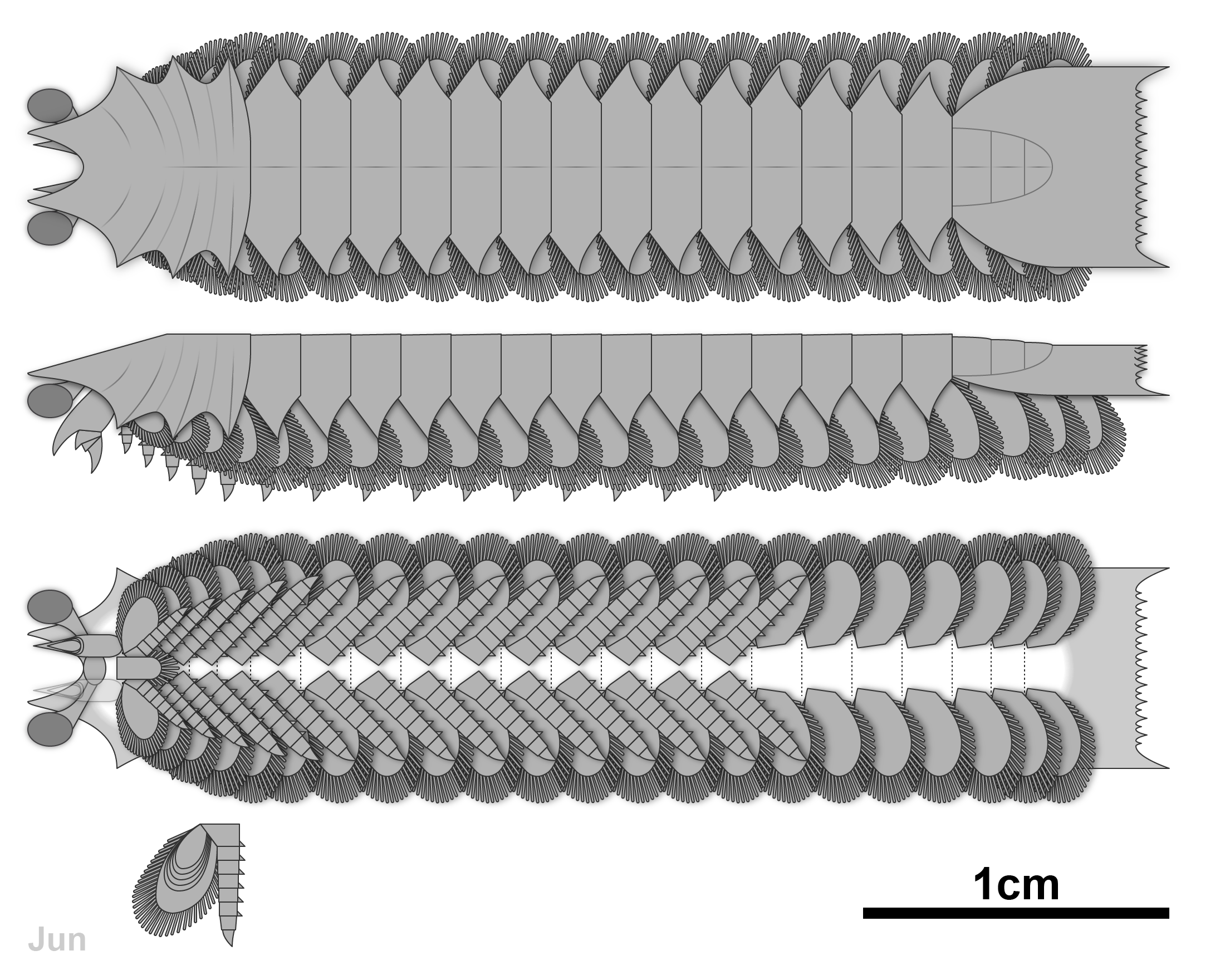
Anatomical diagram after Liu et al. 2026

In contrast, Liu et al. 2026 interpreted the first appendages as a pair of large but relatively short pincer-like appendages. Each have 2 segments developed into the prominent fixed and movable finger, with another 2 reduced segments in between their mobile joint. The authors suggested that these pincer appendages mark a transitional form between multisegmented megacheiran great appendages, long thought to be ancestral to chelicerae, and the true chelicerae of modern chelicerates. For the remaining appendages, they suggested the head to have 5 instead of 3 pairs and the last 4 thoracic segments to also lack endopods. In the case of the biramous appendages, they also revealed endites (inner spikes) underneath the endopods and 5 layers of additional gill-like exites lying behind each exopod. They also discovered a small anterior sclerite underneath the front and a hypostome (ventral mouth plate) fringed by setae.

== Affinities ==
The ventral appendages of Urokodia had been unknown for a long time, and its dorsal features resemble Mollisoniidae (e.g. Mollisonia, Thelxiope, and Corcorania) at first glance. This led to the previous classification of Urokodia as a member of the order Mollisoniida with other mollisoniids. Based on the discovery of Mollisonia appendages in 2019, the group is suggested to be stem-chelicerates.

However, Liu et al. 2024 found that the appendages of Urokodia differed markedly from those of mollisoniids or of any other chelicerates. Phylogenetic analysis based on the new discovery instead placed Urokodia as the most basal member of Artiopoda, an extinct group which includes trilobites and their relatives and may or may not be related to chelicerates. The basal position suggests that the long, slender body shape of Urokodia represents an ancestral trait before the evolution of compact, widened tergites as seen in most artiopods.

Despite this, in a redescription of the genus using micro-CT scanning, Liu et al. 2026 again interpreted Urokodia as a stem-chelicerate, thought not a mollisoniid, finding Urokodia to be more basal than mollisoniids and representing a transitional form between megacheirans and true chelicerates. For example, the pincer-like appendages with two reduced segments of Urokodia represent an intermediate form between the multi-segmented great appendages of megacheirans and the 2-segmented pincers as seen in the chelicerae of true chelicerates. The exites were described as more numerous than megacheirans, bringing Urokodia closer to chelicerate book gills. The post-oral appendages are not differentiated between the boundary of head and trunk tagma, just like megacheirans, but the head itself has the same amount of fused body segments as true chelicerates (ocular segment+6) instead of megacheirans (ocular segment+5 or less).

A consensus Bayesian phylogenetic tree based on Liu et al. 2026, showing Urokodia as an intermediate taxon between megacheirans and more crownward chelicerates such as habeliids, mollisoniids, and Megachelicerax:

- †Chengjiangocaris
- †Alacaris
- - †Artiopoda
  - Cheliceromorpha
    - - †Jianfengia
      - †Sklerolibyon
    - - †Fortiforceps
      - - †Yohoia
        - - †Haikoucaris
          - - - †Alalcomenaeus
              - - †Leanchoilia illecebrosa
                - - †Leanchoilia superlata
                  - †Yawunik
            - - †Urokodia
              - - †Mollisoniida
                  - †Mollisonia symmetrica
                  - - †Thelxiope
                    - †Mollisonia plenovatrix
                - - - †Sanctacaris
                    - †Utahcaris
                  - - †Wisangocaris
                    - - †Habelia
                      - Chelicerata sensu stricto
                        - †Megachelicerax
                        - - †Offacolus
                          - - - †Setapedites
                              - †Dibasterium
                            - - †Weinbergina
                              - - †Venustulus
                                - - †Lunataspis
                                  - - Limulidae
                                      - †Yunnanolimulus
                                      - - Tachypleus gigas
                                        - Limulus polyphemus
                                    - Pycnogonida
                                      - †Flagellopantopus
                                      - - †Palaeoisopus
                                        - - Pycnogonum litorale
                                          - †Haliestes
