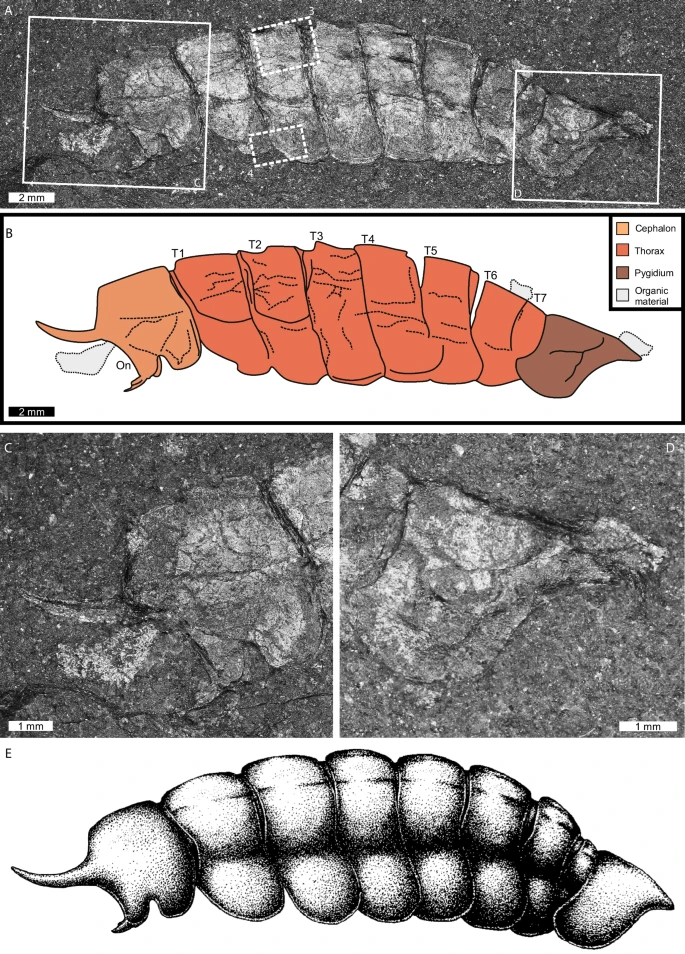
- Holotype specimen

Scientific classification
- Kingdom: Animalia
- Phylum: Arthropoda
- Subphylum: Chelicerata
- Order: †Mollisoniida
- Family: †Corcoraniidae
- Genus: †Magnicornaspis; Bicknell, Kimmig, Goodman, Turner & Smith, 2026
- Species: †M. garwoodi

Binomial name
- †Magnicornaspis garwoodi Bicknell, Kimmig, Goodman, Turner & Smith, 2026

= Magnicornaspis =

Magnicornaspis Temporal range: Cambrian Stage 10

Extinct genus of corcoraniid arthropod

Magnicornaspis is an extinct genus of chelicerate arthropod belonging to the family Corcoraniidae. It was discovered in the Rivière-du-Loup Formation of Quebec and dates to the Cambrian Stage 10 of the Furongian. The only species is M. garwoodi.

== Discovery and naming ==
The holotype USNM PAL 801575 was collected by C. Hubert in 1962 near Sainte-Anne-de-la-Pocatière, Quebec, Canada. It was originally assigned to black shales of the Sainte-Anne Member, the uppermost unit of the Saint-Damase Formation within the Trois-Pistoles Group. However, these levels were assigned to a new unit, the Rivière-du-Loup Formation. This formation is situated between the older Saint-Damase Formation and the younger Kamouraska Formation. Its thickness ranges from about 200 m to only approximately 15 m in the L’Islet–Kamouraska sector. It consists of pelities interstratified with rarer siltstone (20%) and sandstone beds (5%). These deposits likely represent a relatively calm distal slope environment periodically influenced by turbidity currents whereas the underlying Saint-Damase Formation represents more energetic cyclic turbidite systems. The formation is currently dated to the Furongian, more precisely possibly the late Steptoan or Sunwaptan regional stages, equivalent to the Cambrian Stage 10. The locality where the holotype was found is unspecified; however, its matrix is indistinguishable from these beds.

The generic name Magnicornaspis is derived from the Latin magnus, meaning large, cornu meaning horn and aspis meaning shield. The specific name honors Russell Garwood for his contributions to the study of chelicerate evolution.

== Description ==
The cephalic shield is 4.42 mm long and 4.99 mm wide. The tergopleural (lateral) regions are rounded. The anterior margin possibly bears an ocular notch. The shield bears a prominent anterior spine and a smaller spine on the ventral side of the anterior margin. The thorax is 16.82 mm long and composed of seven tergites. The tergites are roughly similar in size, with the exception of the last one which is smaller. The tergites do not bear any spines. The pygidium is 5.29 mm long and 3.69 mm wide with a terminal spine.

It can be distinguished from Thelxiope by the lack of large dorsal spines. The prominent cephalic spine distinguishes Magnicornaspis from Mollisonia. It shares more similarities with Corcorania and is assigned to the family Corcoraniidae.
