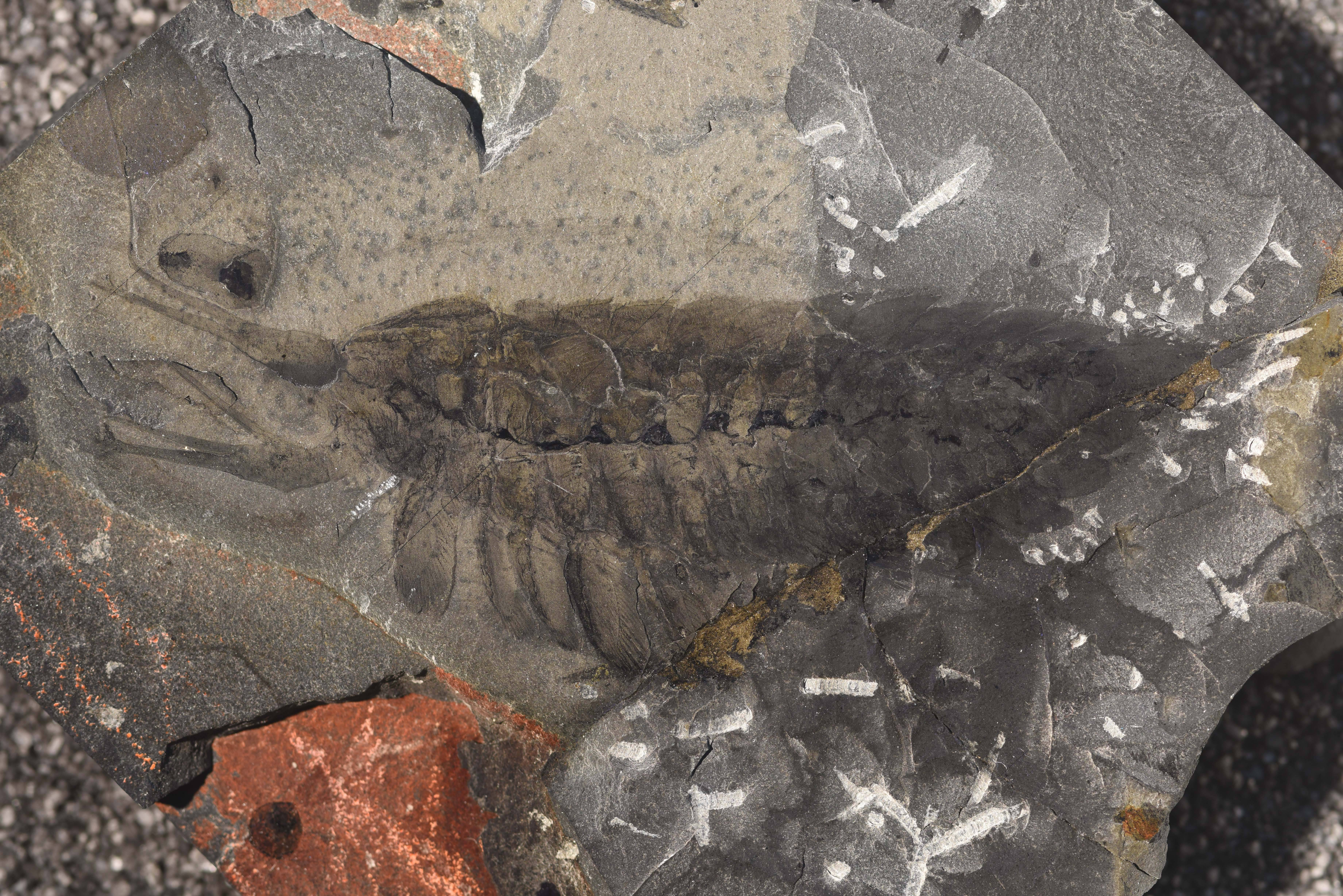
- Fossil of Leanchoilia superlata, a megacheiran
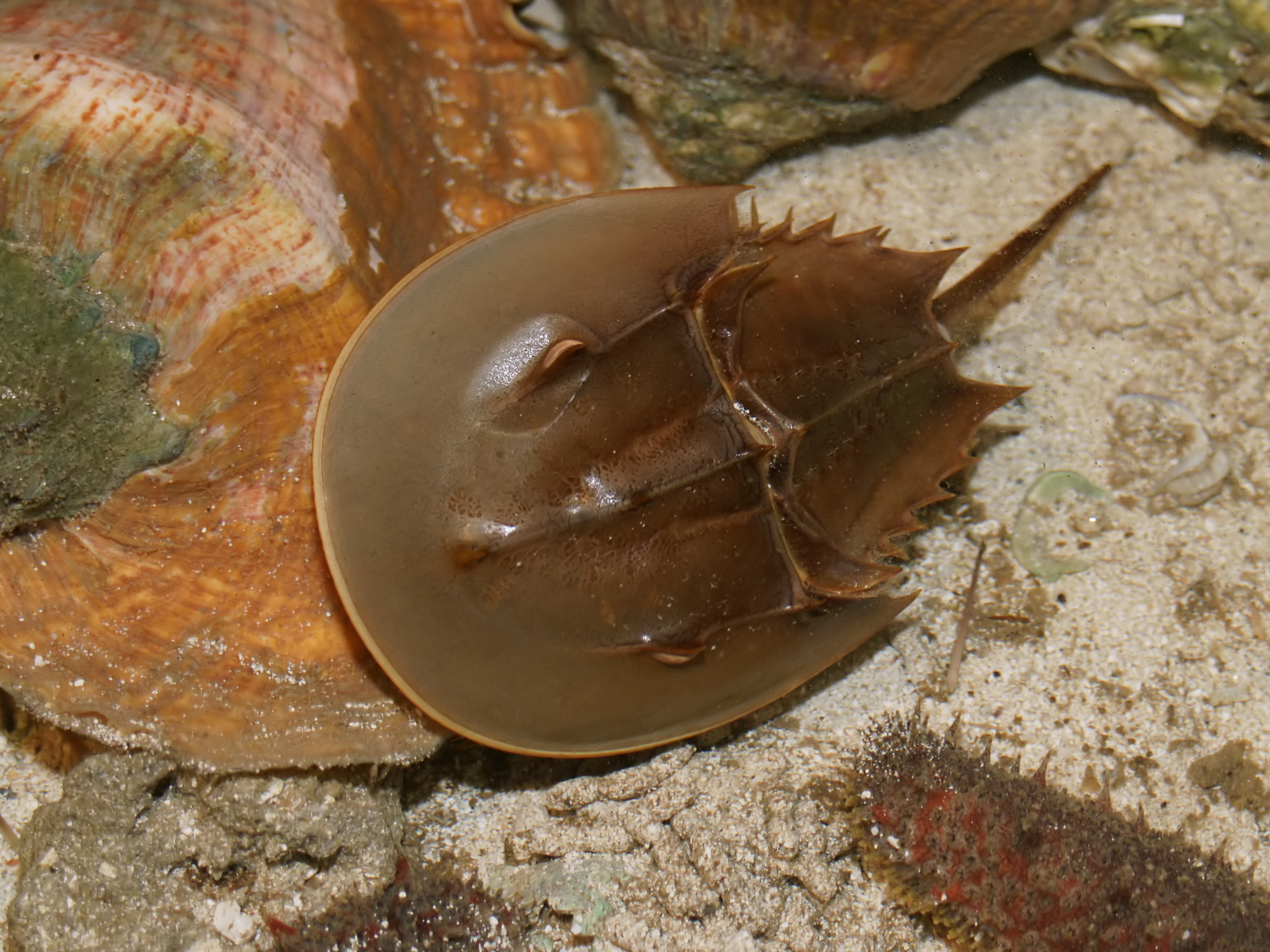
- Limulus polyphemus, a xiphosurid chelicerate

Scientific classification
- Kingdom: Animalia
- Phylum: Arthropoda
- Clade: Deuteropoda
- (unranked): Cheliceromorpha; Boudreaux, 1979

Subgroups
- †Megacheira; †Urokodia; Mollisoniida; Habeliida; †Megachelicerax; Offacolidae; Prosomapoda

= Cheliceromorpha =

Cheliceromorpha Temporal range: Cambrian stage 3–Recent

Proposed clade of arthropods

Cheliceromorpha is a proposed clade of arthropods comprising Megacheira and Chelicerata. It is equivalent to total-group Chelicerata with the exclusion of Artiopoda (trilobite and relatives). Defining traits of Cheliceromorpha including a deutocerebral (align to the second brain segment) pair of raptorial appendages with 6 or less segments (e.g. great appendages, chelicerae), and exites of trunk appendages with overlapping lamellae which evolved into book gills in crown-group chelicerates.

== See also ==
- Arachnomorpha
