= Madeleine Fritz =

Canadian palaeontologist (1896–1990)

Madeleine A. Fritz
- Born: 3 November 1896; Saint John, New Brunswick, Canada
- Died: 20 August 1990 (aged 94); Toronto, Ontario
- Education: McGill University; University of Toronto
- Scientific career
- Fields: Palaeontology

Madeleine Alberta Fritz (3 November 1896 – 20 August 1990) was a Canadian palaeontologist. She was a professor at the University of Toronto, where she taught vertebrate studies in the department of Geology. Fritz's writing on the fossil Bryozoa along with her research on the stratigraphy of Toronto and the surrounding areas were major contributions to the geological field.

Fritz is considered one of the pioneering researchers on the Palaeozoic fossil Bryozoa, which is a type of sea creature that bonds together and builds joint skeletons composed of tiny chambers or tubes. Her research on these creatures has led her to being called the “great-grandmother of Palaeozoic Bryozoa". Her scientific journals on these extinct marine invertebrates are internationally acclaimed.

Fritz worked at The Royal Ontario Museum as an associate director from 1936 to 1955, and later became the Invertebrate Palaeontology Curator at the ROM from 1955 to 1957. In 1956, she became a palaeontology professor at University of Toronto under the Department of Geology until her official retirement in 1967. Fritz was a member of the Geological Association of Canada and the Geological Society of America. She also was a member of the Canadian Confederation of University Women and the International Federation of University Women Panel of Experts.

== Early life ==
Madeleine Fritz was born in Saint John, New Brunswick. Growing up, she developed a fascination for the geological formations, like mountains, of her hometown. Her father was a sea captain, so she spent many of her early years in and around the ocean. As a young girl she often played on the beach with marine life, which sparked her initial interest in fossil invertebrates.

Fritz studied Arts and English at McGill University in Montreal. After graduating with a Bachelor of Arts degree in 1919, she went on to teach at Elmwood Private Girls School in Ottawa, Canada. While living in Ottawa, she met palaeontologist, Alice Wilson. Wilson was an assistant palaeontologist at the Geological Survey of Canada, which was based out of Ottawa. Alice Wilson in 1930 became the first woman in Canada to be elected a Fellow of the Royal Society of Canada and twelve years later, in 1942, Fritz would become the second woman to be elected to the organization. When they met, Wilson was preparing to embark on a geological expedition to Lake Winnipeg. Due to strict gender rules of that time, Wilson would not have been permitted to travel with any male colleagues. Therefore, she invited Fritz to join her on the expedition as her assistant while school was out for the summer. Fritz signed up as a "cook and canoe man," and accompanied Wilson for the six-week expedition in Manitoba.

After returning from her expedition with Alice Wilson, Fritz remained a teacher at Elmwood for one more year prior to deciding to enrol in the geology program offered at the University of Toronto. At the time, she was the only woman in the Geology program.

== Academic career ==
While attending the University of Toronto in 1920, Fritz was the only female graduate student in the geology department. Despite this, Fritz mentioned that she felt accepted by those in her class and that no one ever tried to deter her from pursuing her degree in geology. She completed her M.A. in 1923 and her Ph.D. in 1926, making her the first woman in Canada to have ever received a Ph.D. within the geology/palaeontology field.

In 1927, Fritz was hired as an assistant at the Royal Ontario Museum of Palaeontology, which was affiliated with the University of Toronto. This position made her the only female geologist in Canada to hold an academic position in the field of geology during the interwar years.

In 1935, Fritz was hired as an assistant professor in the geology department at the University of Toronto. In 1955, Fritz became the curator of the Department of Invertebrate Palaeontology of the Royal Ontario Museum. She was the first woman to hold this position. In 1956, Fritz became a full professor at the University of Toronto. It took over twenty years for her to be promoted from assistant professor to full professor; this demonstrates lateral segregation. She ended up juggling fieldwork, teaching and administrative duties for a good part of her career. Fritz officially ended her career with retirement in 1967, but she continued to research human evolution and origin of the Earth for the majority of her life.

She also took part in a lot of fieldwork over the course of her career which was opposed quite strongly by the Geological Survey of Canada.

Fritz's career was a reflection of a successful female academic breakthrough in a field mainly dominated by males since it was associated with rugged work like mining and exploration. She broke barriers regarding female gender roles of getting married and raising children as a career, and instead pursued her graduate degree. Fritz continued these accomplishments through participating in field work and publishing numerous research paper's while actively maintaining her administration and teaching roles.

She has inspired many students through her work, like Mary Turner. It is possible that Fritz may have been trying to encourage her protégées to pursue doctoral studies so that there would be a strong cohort of women trained to replace her prior to her retirement. However, some female students may not have wanted to make the personal sacrifices that many of the early women in geology had made in terms of remaining single and focusing solely on their careers.

== Commemoration ==
Madeleine Fritz's contribution to palaeontology is remembered during the "Madeleine Fritz Annual Lecture in Palaeontology" event where namely women guest speakers discuss advancements in the geological field. It is also a space for discussion about new research and findings in the field. This event is held at the Royal Ontario Museum.

The Royal Ontario Museum has an annual travel grant that Fritz had created a fund for. Each year, two grants are given out to students furthering their education in palaeontology. Up to 1,000 dollars is awarded for each grant. It is used to lighten the financial burden for the students so that they can attend the Royal Ontario Museum and examine their artifacts and fossils. The grant is called the "M.A Fritz Travel Grant", having been named after her.

== Honours ==
Fritz received several honours throughout her lifetime. In 1942 she entered the Royal Society of Canada as the second woman to receive such honour within Canada. In 1967, Fritz received the Canadian Centennial Medal. In 1975, Fritz was one of nineteen Canadian female scientists honoured in a display at the National Museum of Natural Science. In 1977, University of Toronto awarded her a distinguished service award.

== Publications ==
Throughout her lifetime, Madeleine Fritz wrote many different research papers, composing over sixty of them between the years 1923 and 1927. Her main research was on the topic of Canadian faunas and fossils, specifically she made significant contributions to research of Palaeozoic Bryozoa.

From 1922 to 1927 Fritz worked with Dr. William Arthur Parks alongside other students and paleontologists to compile an inventory of fossils from the Upper Ordovician stratigraphy found in the Credit River area. This work was published from 1923 to 1927 in 6 different papers by the Ontario Department of Mines and are still cited today as definitive works on the subject.

In 1937, Fritz authored a journal entry in the field of Palaeontology named "Multisolenia, A New Genus of Palaeozoic Corals" while at the University of Toronto. She described a new genus Multisolenia, a coral found in the Silurian of the Lake Timiskaming-district in northern Ontario. The genotype described was Multisolenia tortuosa Fritz. Two years later she provided further evidence for the distinction of the new found genus.

Madeleine Fritz wrote a paper on the redescription of Trepostomatous bryozoan types that came from the Upper Ordovician rocks of Toronto and its surrounding areas. In addition, she redescribed type specimens from the Bryozoan Heterotrypa from Upper Ordovician rocks that came from the Credit River Valley area in Ontario. She studied the species Atactoporella, Homotrypa, and Homotrypella. These bryozoan types are situated at the Royal Ontario Museum in the Department of Invertebrate Paleontology. She also redescribed a variation of the genus S. catenulata diversa as Mesotrypa catenulata diversa. Additionally, she redescribed bryozoan-type samples which gathered from the marine rocks surrounding Workman's Creek.

It was during the time that Fritz studied under renowned palaeontologist William Arthur Parks that she took on a leadership role in the North American study of Ordovician Bryozoa. She was very grateful to have been able to be mentored by Parks, and she demonstrated her gratitude by writing a biography of him that was published in 1971.

=== Bibliography ===
Among the published writings of Madeleine Fritz are:

- Fritz, Madeleine A. (1937). "Multisolenia, a New Genus of Paleozoic Corals". Journal of Paleontology. 11 (3): 231–234. JSTOR 1298501.
- —— (1939). "Two Unique Silurian Corals". Journal of Paleontology. 13 (5): 512–513. JSTOR 1298518.
- —— (1971). William Arthur Parks, Ph. D., LL. D., F.R.S., 1868-1936. Toronto: Royal Ontario Museum. OCLC 202762.
- —— (1982). "Redescription of type specimens of species of the bryozoan genera Dekayia, Homotrypa, and Stigmatella from Upper Ordovician rocks along Workman's Creek, Ontario". Life Science Contributions (132). Toronto: Royal Ontario Museum (ROM). OCLC 1052536628.
