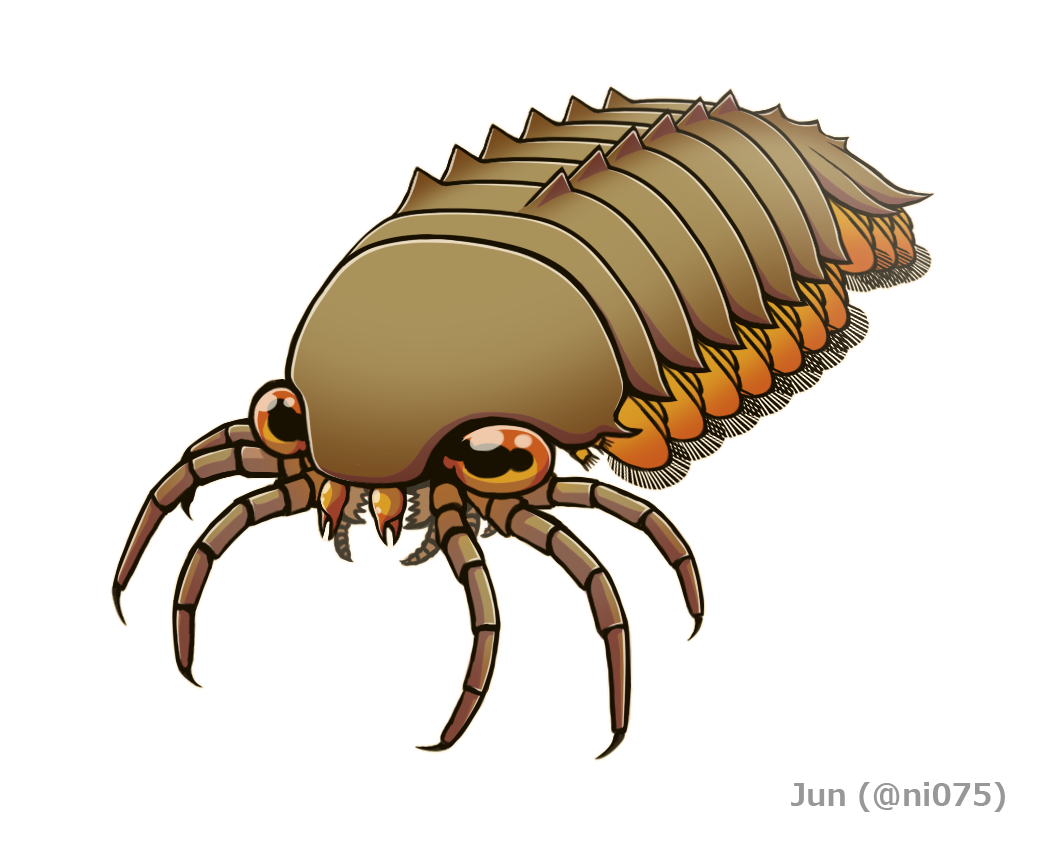
- Reconstruction of Mollisonia plenovenatrix

Scientific classification
- Kingdom: Animalia
- Phylum: Arthropoda
- Subphylum: Chelicerata
- Order: †Mollisoniida
- Family: †Mollisoniidae
- Genus: †Mollisonia; Walcott, 1912

Type species
- †Mollisonia symmetrica Walcott, 1912

Species
- †Mollisonia gracilis Walcott, 1912; †Mollisonia plenovenatrix Aria and Caron, 2019; †Mollisonia sinica Zhang et al., 2002; †Mollisonia symmetrica Walcott, 1912

Synonyms
- Houghtonites Raymond, 1931

= Mollisonia =

Mollisonia Temporal range: Cambrian Stage 3–Floian

Extinct genus of Cambrian Arthropod

Mollisonia is an extinct genus of Cambrian marine arthropod. Four species have been described from North America and China. Studies suggest it is a basal member of Chelicerata, a group which includes horseshoe crabs and arachnids.

== Description ==
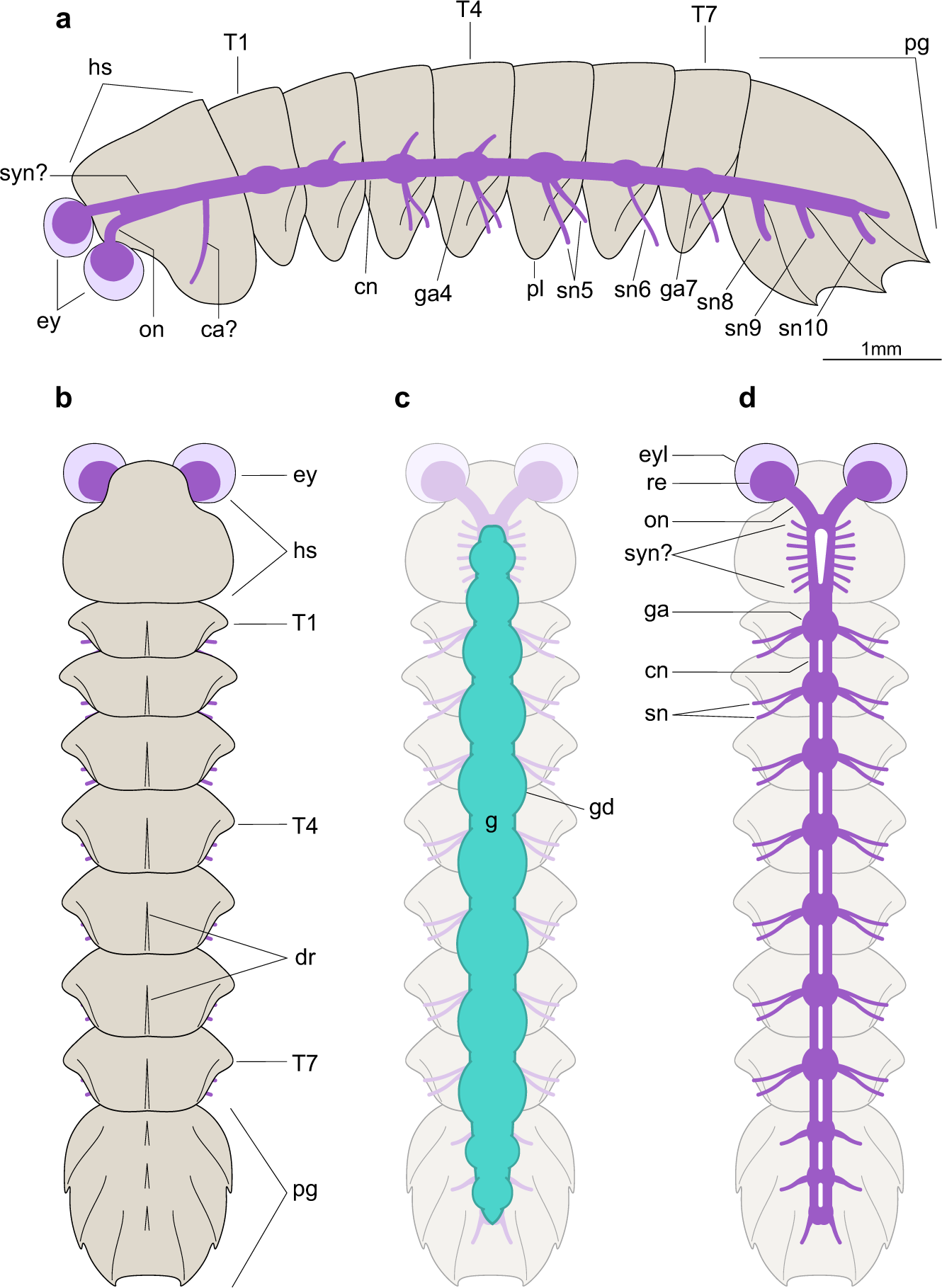
Mollisonia symmetrica in various views showing digestive (cyan) and nervous systems (purple)

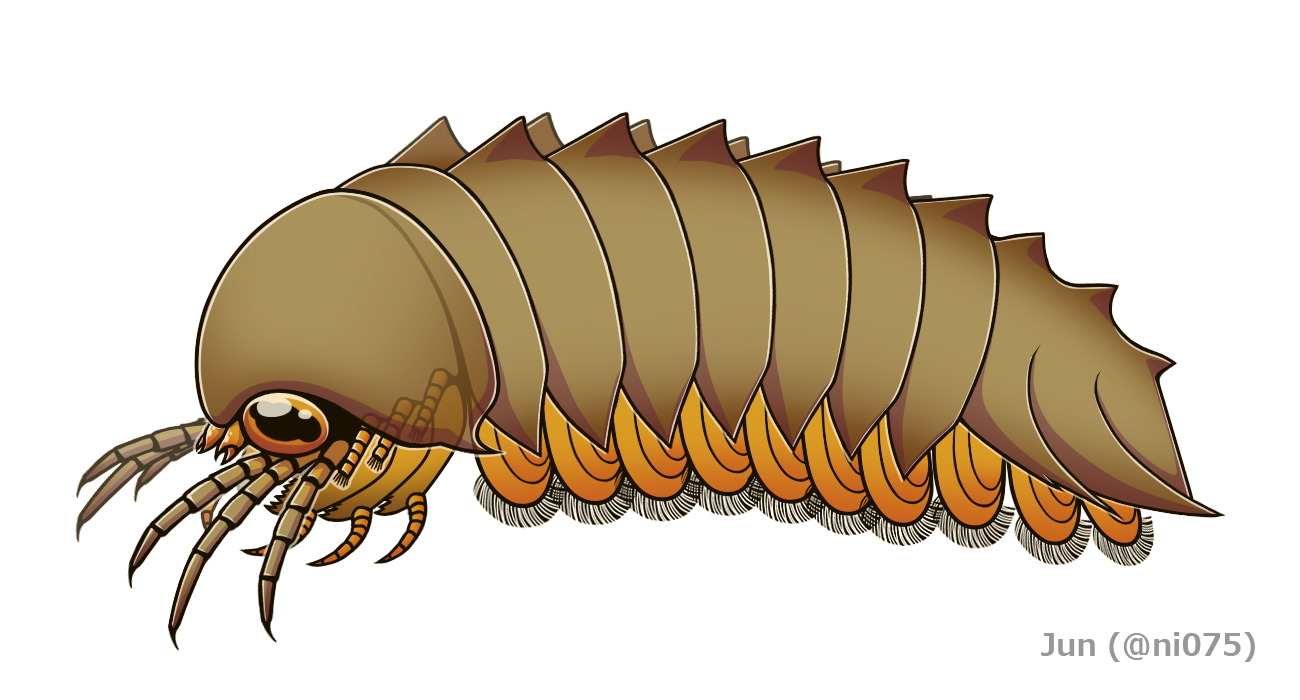
Reconstruction of Mollisonia plenovenatrix in lateral wiew

The genus is characterized by a capsule-like dorsal exoskeleton (tergites), which was divided into a cephalon (head segment), 7 thoracic body segments, and a terminal pygidium. Below the cephalon was a pair of huge compound eyes, followed by three pairs of walking legs and three pairs of limbs with large gnathobasic spines used to process food. As a Cambrian arthropod, the genus is significant by bearing several traits of now-surviving chelicerates, such as purportedly pincer-like mouthparts (chelicerae) and fused ring-like cephalic nerves (synganglion) within their head, as well as a series of multilayered book gills underneath their trunk appendages. Later scholars have questioned whether true chelicerae were actually present in Mollisonia.

Mollisonia may have been a benthic predator, using its anterior chelicerae and posterior gnathobasic limbs to devour prey items while using the 6 legs to walk around the sea floor. The gill-bearing trunk appendages may have been solely for breathing. This functional differentiation (head/prosomal appendages for feeding and walking, trunk/opisthosomal appendages for breathing) is closer to euchelicerates (crown-group chelicerates other than sea spiders) than the basal chelicerate genera of Habeliida (e.g. Habelia, Sanctacaris).

== Distribution and taxonomy ==
Three species (M. symmetrica, M. gracilis, M. plenovenatrix) are known from the Burgess Shale, with 21 specimens are known from the Greater Phyllopod bed, where they comprise less than 0.1% of the community as of 2006. The genus is also known from Langston Formation, and Wheeler Shale of North America, as well as Chengjiang Biota of China (M. sinica). Remains possibly attributable to the genus are also known from the Ordovician Fezouata Formation of Morocco and Bøggild Fjord Formation in Greenland.

The taxonomic affinity of this genus was enigmatic until the discovery of its chelicerate features in 2019. Subsequent studies suggest it is a basal chelicerate, closer to crown-group Euchelicerata than members of Habeliida. It is also suggested to be closely related to Corcorania, Urokodia (formerly), and Thelxiope, which together form the order Mollisoniida. A 2025 study suggested that Mollisonia was deeply nested within crown chelicerates as a close relative of living arachnids, based on interpretations of its fossilised neural anatomy; these interpretations have since been criticized.

Cladogram after O’Flynn et al., 2023, placing Mollisonia as a stem-chelicerate:

- Total group Arthropoda
  - "Gilled lobopodians" (Pambdelurion, Kerygmachela)
  - - Opabinia
    - - Radiodonta (e.g Anomalocaris)
      - Deuteropoda
        - - Kylinxia
          - Fengzhengia
        - - - Kiisortoqia
            - Bushizheia
          - - Megacheira
            - - Habeliida
              - - Mollisonia
                - Chelicerata (horseshoe crabs, sea spiders, arachnids, etc)
          - - - "Great appendage bivalved forms" (Occacaris, Forfexicaris)
              - Isoxyida
            - - Artiopoda (including Trilobita)
              - Mandibulata
                - Fuxianhuiida
                - - Myriapoda (millipedes, centipedes, etc)
                  - - Hymenocarina
                    - Pancrustacea (crustaceans, insects, etc)

Cladogram after Strausfeld et al. (2025), showing Mollisonia as a stem-arachnid:

- Arthropoda
  - Mandibulata
    - - Fuxianhuiida
      - Myriapoda (millipedes, centipedes, etc)
    - Pancrustacea (crustaceans, insects, etc)
  - pan-Chelicerata
    - Leanchoiliidae
    - - Pycnogonida (sea spiders)
      - - Xiphosura (horseshoe crabs, etc)
        - Arachnida
          - Mollisonia
          - modern arachnids (spiders, scorpions, solifuges, whip spiders, vinegaroons, etc.)

== See also ==
- Paleobiota of the Burgess Shale
