= Alice Wilson =

Canadian geologist and paleontologist (1881–1964)

Alice Wilson MBE FRSC FRCGS
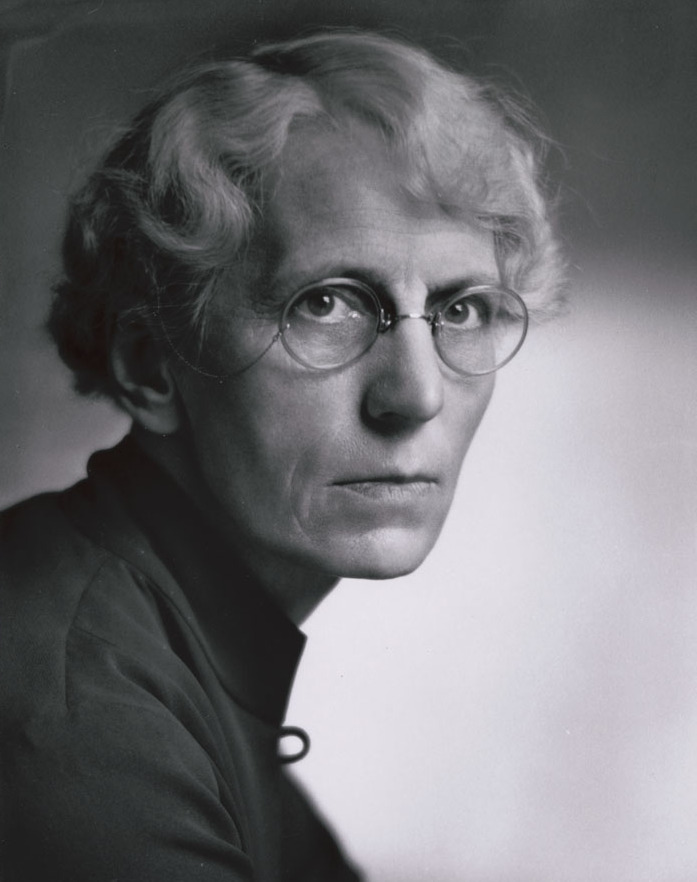
- Born: August 26, 1881; Cobourg, Ontario, Canada
- Died: April 15, 1964 (aged 82); Ottawa, Ontario, Canada
- Education: University of Chicago and Victoria University, Toronto
- Known for: First female geologist in Canada
- Scientific career
- Fields: Geologist
- Workplaces: Geological Survey of Canada

Alice Evelyn Wilson MBE FRSC FRCGS (August 26, 1881 – April 15, 1964) was Canada's first female geologist. She is best known for her scientific studies of rocks and fossils in the Ottawa region between 1913 and 1963.

== Early life ==
Alice Evelyn Wilson was born on 26 August 1881 in Cobourg, Ontario, the daughter of Mary Adelia Kingston Wilson and Dr. John Wilson, a professor of Classics at the University of Toronto.

She grew up in an academically oriented household and was one of three children, with two older brothers. One of them, Alfred William Gunning Wilson, later became a geologist and earned a doctorate from Harvard University, while another brother, Norman Wilson, was noted for his ability in mathematics. The family environment placed a strong emphasis on scholarship, languages, and intellectual pursuits, influences that would shape Wilson's later scientific career.

Wilson experienced fragile health during childhood. To strengthen her condition, her father encouraged regular outdoor activity, and the family spent time canoeing and camping in the landscapes of southern Ontario. These excursions introduced Wilson to the region's natural environments at an early age and fostered an enduring interest in geology and natural history. During these outings she began collecting fossils from the limestone formations near her home, an activity that developed into a lasting fascination with palaeontology.

Wilson received her early education in Cobourg. While she was still a child, her family moved to Toronto after her father joined the faculty of the University of Toronto.

== Education ==
Wilson's path through higher education was unusually long and fragmented, interrupted first by serious illness and later by institutional barriers that delayed her pursuit of advanced study for more than two decades.

=== University studies ===
In 1901, at the age of 20, Wilson enrolled at Victoria College, a federated college of the University of Toronto, where she studied modern languages and history. Her original intention was to become a teacher, one of the few professional careers widely regarded as socially acceptable for educated women in the early twentieth century.

During her final year of study, after several years at the university, Wilson became seriously ill with anemia. The illness forced her to withdraw from the university before completing her degree.

=== Completion of degree ===
After a prolonged period of recovery, Wilson began working in 1907, at the age of 25, as an assistant at the Museum of Mineralogy at the University of Toronto. The position introduced her to scientific collections and research environments and marked the beginning of her transition toward scientific work.

Two years later, in 1909, she joined the Geological Survey of Canada (GSC), which was then headquartered in the Victoria Memorial Museum in Ottawa. There she worked in the invertebrate palaeontology section under the supervision of palaeontologist Percy Raymond. Raymond encouraged Wilson to complete her university studies while continuing her work at the Survey.

Wilson resumed her studies and eventually completed her degree at the University of Toronto in 1911, at the age of 29.

=== Attempts at doctoral study ===
Wilson's growing scientific work made her eligible to pursue doctoral studies in 1915, when she was 34 years old. She repeatedly requested leave from the Geological Survey of Canada in order to undertake advanced study, but her requests were denied, even though similar leave was granted to male scientists.

Beginning in 1920 her supervisor, geologist Edward M. Kindle, supported her efforts to pursue further education, though other leaders within the Survey remained opposed. Wilson later wrote that although various explanations had been offered for the refusals, she believed the fundamental reason was that granting her leave would make a woman eligible for the highest scientific positions within the Survey.

For nearly a decade Wilson continued to seek permission to pursue further study. In 1924, at the age of 43, she was finally granted leave, but without salary, which required her to seek outside funding in order to continue her studies.

After several years of applications she was awarded a scholarship from the Canadian Federation of University Women in 1926, when she was 45 years old. The scholarship helped support her continuing academic work despite the institutional barriers she had faced.

== Career ==
=== Early professional career ===
In 1907, Wilson started her career at the University of Toronto museum in the mineralogy division, despite not having completed her degree.

In 1909, she took an assistant job at the Victoria Memorial Museum, and then became eligible and took a temporary clerk position at the Geological Survey of Canada (GSC), which was headquartered at the Victoria Memorial Museum in Ottawa.

Her past education of studying languages would later prove useful when she was requested to translate a portion of Karl Alfred von Zittel's Text-Book of Paleontology from German to English by Percy Raymond, who also advocated for Wilson to take a leave of absence from the GSC in order to finish her degree, which she received in 1910.

Following her return in 1911, she was given a permanent position at the GSC, although she was still not allowed to participate in field studies alongside her male peers. This policy was finally changed in 1970.

Before the departure of colleague Percy Raymond, she wrote two articles, both of which recorded new species of animals. Respectively, a new branchiopod and then a bivalve. Wilson faced significant difficulty being included in her colleagues' work after that.

In 1916, during the First World War, Wilson's place of work, the Victoria Memorial Museum, was shut down and reoccupied as a war-time parliament. During this time, Wilson funded her projects with her own money, studying comparative anatomy and marine biology in Long Island, New York. Later, Wilson took part in the war-time effort on the home front, joining the Canadian equivalent of the Women's Land Army.

At war's end in 1920, Wilson went back to the Victoria Memorial Museum. She was promoted to assistant geologist in 1936.[4] This was in lieu of the position she had requested for, which was Assistant Paleontologist. This was the highest position she had been allowed to advance to, due to her difficulty obtaining the scholarships to pursue the level of education she wanted.

Meadowcroft had written that Wilson had become primary Geologist in 1945 but there is no documentary evidence of this claim.

=== Fieldwork and research ===
For much of her career, Wilson's geological work centred on the Ottawa–St. Lawrence Lowlands, a region that became the focus of her long-term field investigations. She began studying the area in the early 1910s, only a few years after joining the Geological Survey of Canada in 1909 and completing her university degree in 1911.

Because women employed by the Survey were not permitted to accompany male colleagues on field expeditions, Wilson proposed an alternative approach to field research in areas accessible from Ottawa. She obtained permission to conduct independent field studies in the Ottawa–St. Lawrence Valley, which at the time had received relatively little detailed geological investigation.

Over the following decades Wilson travelled extensively through the region, initially on foot and by bicycle and later by car. When the Survey declined to provide her with a vehicle, a resource commonly available to male field geologists, she purchased her own. Through repeated surveys and field observations she gradually built a detailed understanding of the region's Paleozoic geology. Over the course of approximately fifty years she mapped more than 14,000 square kilometres (5,400 sq mi) of the Ottawa–St. Lawrence Lowlands.

Regional geological mapping in the early twentieth century was typically carried out by teams of survey geologists working from temporary field camps and moving between districts over successive seasons. Wilson's work in the Ottawa–St. Lawrence Lowlands differed in that she returned repeatedly to the same region over several decades, gradually building a detailed stratigraphic and palaeontological understanding of the landscape through long familiarity with its rock formations and fossil deposits.

Wilson's field investigations began only a few years before the outbreak of the First World War in 1914. During the war, when she was in her mid-thirties, the Victoria Memorial Museum in Ottawa was closed and used as temporary parliamentary offices, disrupting scientific work at the Geological Survey. After the war ended in 1918, Wilson resumed her investigations in eastern Ontario and Quebec, returning repeatedly to the same terrain as she refined her interpretation of the region's geological structure.

Much of Wilson's research focused on the stratigraphy and invertebrate palaeontology of Paleozoic rocks in eastern Canada. In Ontario she studied Ordovician sediments and fossil assemblages in the Ottawa Valley, contributing to the classification and interpretation of early marine life preserved in the region's limestone formations. Her work also extended beyond eastern Ontario; she examined Ordovician fossil faunas in the Rocky Mountains and in Arctic regions of Canada.

Nearly two decades after she began her independent field studies, Wilson's research program expanded during the economic upheavals of the Great Depression in the 1930s. As geological surveys increasingly supported petroleum exploration in western Canada, she undertook studies of Devonian rocks and worked on the identification and classification of Paleozoic invertebrate fossils. As part of this work she organized the National Type Collection of fossils, which became an internationally recognized reference collection for the study of Canadian Paleozoic fossils.

By the time the Second World War began in 1939, Wilson had already spent almost thirty years studying the geology of the Ottawa–St. Lawrence region. She continued her research and museum work throughout the war years while resource geology became increasingly important to the wartime economy. Her decades of accumulated field observations ultimately culminated in a major publication by the Geological Survey of Canada in 1946. Appearing thirty-five years after she had completed her university degree and nearly four decades after she first joined the Survey, her book Geology of the St. Lawrence Lowland, Ontario and Quebec represented the first comprehensive geological synthesis of the region.

In addition to describing the geological structure and stratigraphy of the Lowlands, the work examined the region's economic geology, including deposits of building stone, sand, gravel, and groundwater resources. Wilson's studies of the stratigraphy and invertebrate palaeontology of the Paleozoic formations of eastern Canada established a framework for later geological research in the region.

Throughout these years, Wilson remained active in public and educational outreach. While continuing her research on Devonian fossils she led field excursions, guided visitors through geological exhibits at the museum, and delivered public lectures to scientific societies and community organizations, helping introduce wider audiences to the geological history of Canada.

=== Teaching and public engagement ===
From 1948 until 1958 Wilson was a lecturer in Paleontology at Carleton College (later Carleton University). Wilson also worked to bring geology to a broader public. She wrote a children's book, The Earth Beneath our Feet, aimed at encouraging broader knowledge and interest in the science she was so passionate about.

The book for children features three kids asking a geologist different questions about the Earth starting with: "Why do some rocks skip on water better than others?" Dr. Wilson once said that "The earth touches every life. Everyone should receive some understanding of it" (Massive Science). This explains her passion for teaching others about geology and the admiration she gained from her students at Carleton who knew her affectionately as the "rock doctor."

=== Later career and retirement ===
Wilson became a respected member of the GSC and mentored many young geologists through her lectures, field trips, publications, and museum exhibits. However, she was not referred to as "Doctor" by her colleagues until 1945—16 years after she obtained her doctorate. She retired two years later, at the age of 65, as was required by law, though five new hires were required to do the same amount of work as Wilson. However, she kept her office at the GSC and continued her work regardless of not being compensated until her death in 1964.

Wilson's work on researching the geology and paleontology in the area of Cornwall, Ontario and the St. Lawrence lowlands was important for the creation of the St. Lawrence Seaway that was built in 1954.

A few months before her death, Wilson gave up her office at the GSC and informed Dr. James M. Harrison about it. Although Dr. Harrison tried to convince her not to leave, Wilson responded by saying, "[Her] work is done."

== Death ==
Wilson died in Ottawa on April 15, 1964, at the age of 84. Her death marked a significant loss to the academic community, particularly in the field of geology. She is remembered for her work to the understanding of the stratigraphy and invertebrate palaeontology of the Palaeozoic strata of eastern Canada, though that contribution wasn't recognized until after her retirement.

== Awards and recognition ==
Wilson received numerous professional honours during her lifetime and has been commemorated in Canada for her pioneering role in geology.

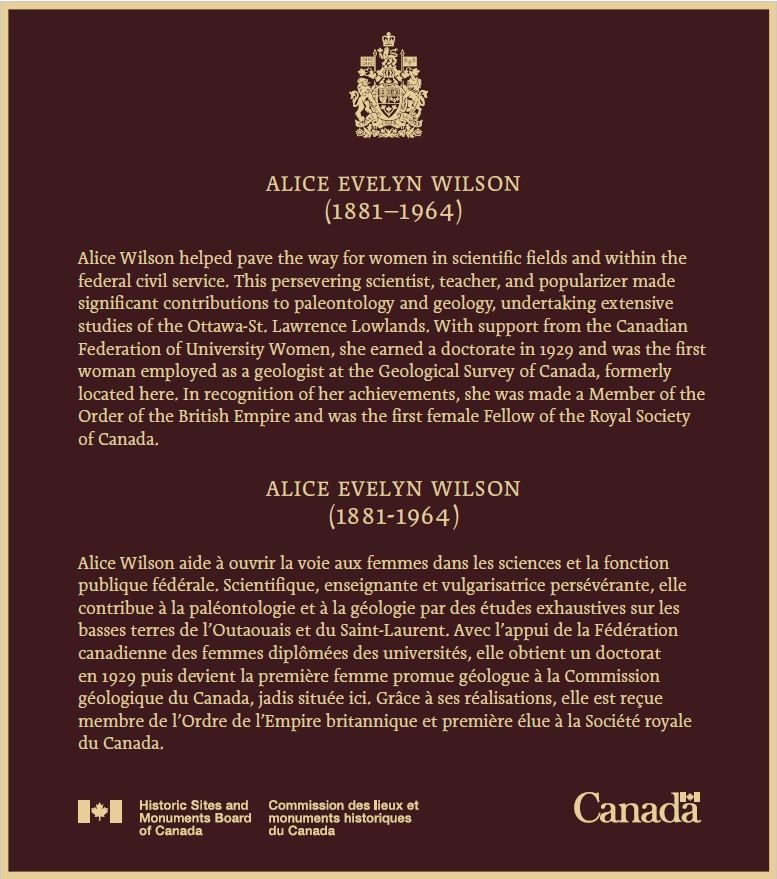

=== Professional firsts ===
- First woman geologist employed by the Geological Survey of Canada in 1909.
- One of the first two women elected Fellows of the Royal Canadian Geographical Society in 1930.
- First Canadian woman admitted to the Geological Society of America in 1936.
- First woman elected Fellow of the Royal Society of Canada in 1938.

=== Honours and awards ===
- Appointed Member of the Order of the British Empire (MBE) for her contributions to science within the Canadian federal civil service in 1935.
- Awarded an honorary doctorate by Carleton University in recognition of her geological research and her work as a lecturer in paleontology in 1960.
- Alice Wilson Award established by the Royal Society of Canada, recognizing outstanding early-career women scholars, in 1991.
- Inducted into the Canadian Science and Engineering Hall of Fame in 2005.

=== Commemorations and memorials ===
- The Geological Survey of Canada named a meeting room "Wilson Hall" in Ottawa in her honour.
- Designated a Person of National Historic Significance by the Government of Canada in 2011.
- A Government of Canada commemorative plaque honouring Wilson was unveiled at the Canadian Museum of Nature on 18 October 2018.
- A tunnel boring machine used for the Réseau express métropolitain (REM) project in Montreal was named "Alice" in her honour in 2019.

== Selected publications ==
- "An Upper Ordovician Fauna from the Rocky Mountains, British Columbia" (PDF). Contributions to Canadian Palaeontology. Geological Survey of Canada: 1–34. November 25, 1926. doi:10.4095/299082. Archived from the original (PDF) on December 15, 2023.
- Contributions to the Study of the Ordovician of Ontario and Quebec. Ottawa: Canada Dpmt. of Mines. 1936.
- Wilson, A. E. (1946). Geology of the Ottawa-St. Lawrence Lowland, Ontario and Quebec. Ottawa: Canada Department of Mines and Resources. doi:10.4095/101632.
- The Earth Beneath Our Feet. Toronto: Macmillan. 1947.
- Miscellaneous Classes of Fossils, Ottawa Formation, Ottawa-St. Lawrence Valley. Ottawa: Geological Survey of Canada. 1948.
- Gastropoda and Conularida of the Ottawa formation of the Ottawa-St. Lawrence lowland (PDF). Ottawa: Geological Survey of Canada. 1951. Archived from the original (PDF) on February 27, 2016.
- Cephalopoda of the Ottawa Formation of the Ottawa-St. Lawrence Lowland. Ottawa: Geological Survey of Canada. 1961.

== See also ==
- Timeline of women in science
