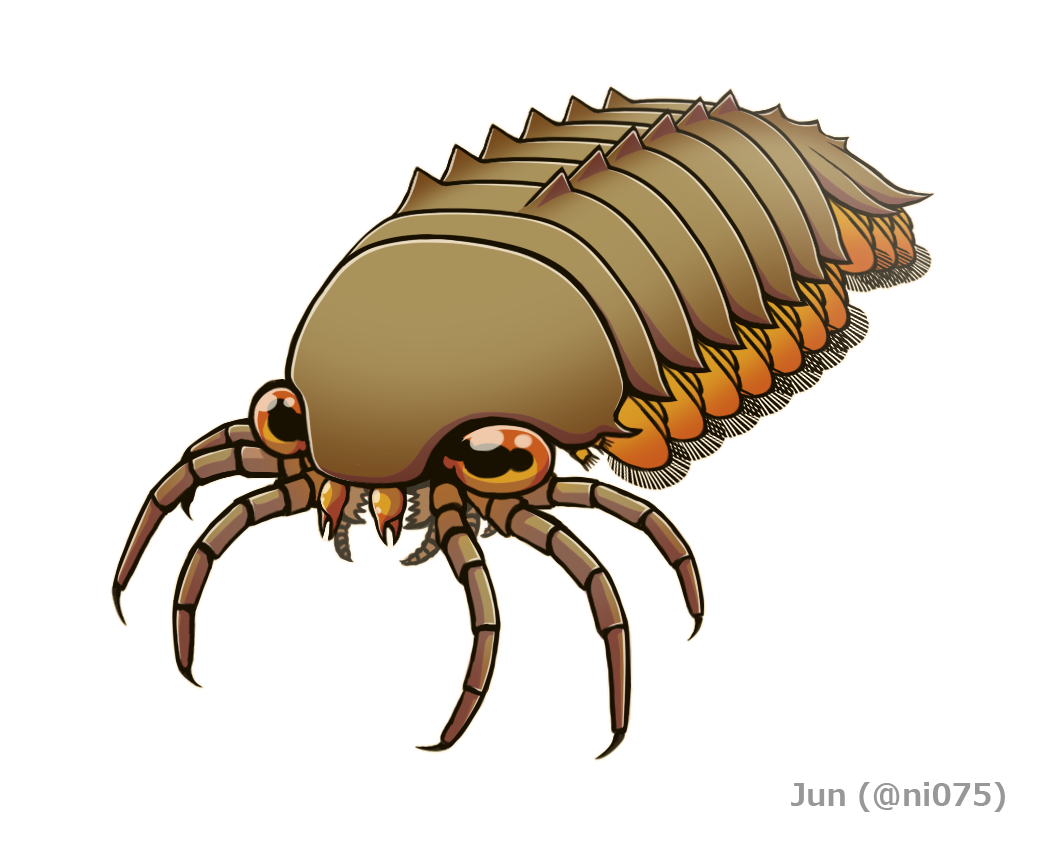
- Restoration of Mollisonia plenovenatrix

Scientific classification
- Kingdom: Animalia
- Phylum: Arthropoda
- Clade: Deuteropoda
- Subphylum: Chelicerata
- Order: †Mollisoniida; Lerosey-Aubrey et al, 2020

Type species
- †Mollisonia symmetrica Walcott, 1912

Genera
- †Mollisonia; †Thelxiope; †Corcorania; †Esmeraldacaris; †Magnicornaspis

= Mollisoniida =

Mollisoniida Temporal range: Cambrian Stage 3–Floian

Extinct order of chelicerates

Mollisoniida is an extinct order of stem group chelicerates that existed from the mid-Cambrian to the Early Ordovician.

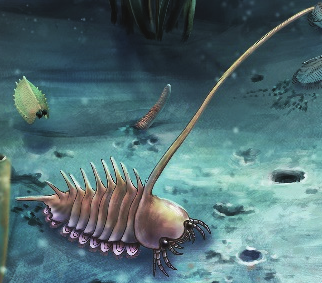
Reconstruction of Thelxiope spinosa

The clade is united by the presence of various characteristics. These include an elongated dorsal exoskeleton, seven articulating tergites (upper body plates corresponding to body segments) and similarly sized cephalic (head) and pygidial (tail) shields, in addition to only having three pairs of walking legs and the rest of the limbs being used as gills (which likely places them nearest to Euchelicerata, due to sharing similar arrangements of limbs). The clade is relatively diverse, containing three (possibly four) genera. Mollisonia and Thelxiope are both known from four species extending from Cambrian to Ordovician, with Thelxiope being very spiny and often with a shortened body. Mollisonia, on the other hand, barely has any spines at all, and (with the exception of Mollisonia plenovenatrix and Mollisonia sinica, which are similarly shaped to Thelxiope) has a relatively elongated body. Corcorania is purely Ordovician, with an elongate body, a small pygidial shield, and three large spines on its cephalic shield. Esmeraldacaris is also purely Ordovician, although its position in the clade is uncertain. However, it seems to be similar in shape to the more compact Mollisonia species, alongside having an equally sized cephalic and pygidial shield and seven tergites, therefore a mollisoniid affinity is most likely for it. Urokodia was formerly included in this clade as a basal member (due to having 14 tergites instead of the standard seven), until a 2024 study reclassified it as the basalmost member of Artiopoda.

Since the discovery of Mollisonia plenovenatrix in 2019, Mollisoniida has been revised from an enigmatic taxon to a group of chelicerates, most likely a stem group alongside Habeliida. A 2025 study have argued them to be crown group chelicerates, more closely related to arachnids than to horseshoe crabs and sea spiders, based on interpretation of preserved neural anatomy in Mollisonia. However, this interpretation have since been criticized, as their discovery are largely based on image editing and lack of comparison on the diversity of arachnid neural anatomy. Some have questioned their chelicerate affinity, as the putative chelicerae found in Mollisonia plenovenatrix are too small to be clarified. A 2026 study recover mollisonids as stem group chelicerates basal than habeliids.

Cladogram after O'Flynn et al, 2023, showing Mollisonia (and by extension Mollisoniida) as stem group members of Chelicerata.

- Total group Arthropoda
  - "Gilled lobopodians" (Pambdelurion, Kerygmachela)
  - - Opabinia
    - - Radiodonta (e.g Anomalocaris)
      - Deuteropoda
        - - Kylinxia
          - Fengzhengia
        - - - Kiisortoqia
            - Bushizheia
          - - Megacheira
            - - Habeliida
              - - Mollisonia
                - crown group Chelicerata (horseshoe crabs, sea spiders, arachnids, etc)
          - - - "Great appendage bivalved forms" (Occacaris, Forfexicaris)
              - Isoxyida
            - - Artiopoda (including Trilobita)
              - Mandibulata
                - Fuxianhuiida
                - - Myriapoda (millipedes, centipedes, etc)
                  - - Hymenocarina
                    - Pancrustacea (crustaceans, insects, etc)

Cladogram after Strausfeld et al. (2025), showing Mollisoniida as nested within Chelicerata as close relatives of modern arachnids (Note the basis of this result is considered questionable).

- Arthropoda
  - Mandibulata
    - - Fuxianhuiida
      - Myriapoda (millipedes, centipedes, etc)
    - Pancrustacea (crustaceans, insects, etc)
  - pan-Chelicerata
    - Leanchoiliidae
    - - Pycnogonida (sea spiders)
      - - Xiphosura (horseshoe crabs, etc)
        - Arachnida
          - Mollisonia
          - modern arachnids (spiders, scorpions, solifuges, whip spiders, vinegaroons, etc.)

Cladogram after Lerosey-Aubril & Ortega-Hernández (2026), showing Mollisoniida basal than Habeliida.

- Arthropoda
  - Fuxianhuiida
  - - Artiopoda
    - - Megacheira (paraphyletic)
      - - Mollisoniida
        - - Habeliida (paraphyletic)
          - - Megachelicerax
            - - Offacolidae (paraphyletic)
              - - Weinbergina
                - - Venustulus
                  - crown group Chelicerata
                    - Pycnogonida (sea spiders)
                    - - Xiphosura (horseshoe crabs)
                      - - Arachnida
                        - Eurypterida (sea scorpions)
