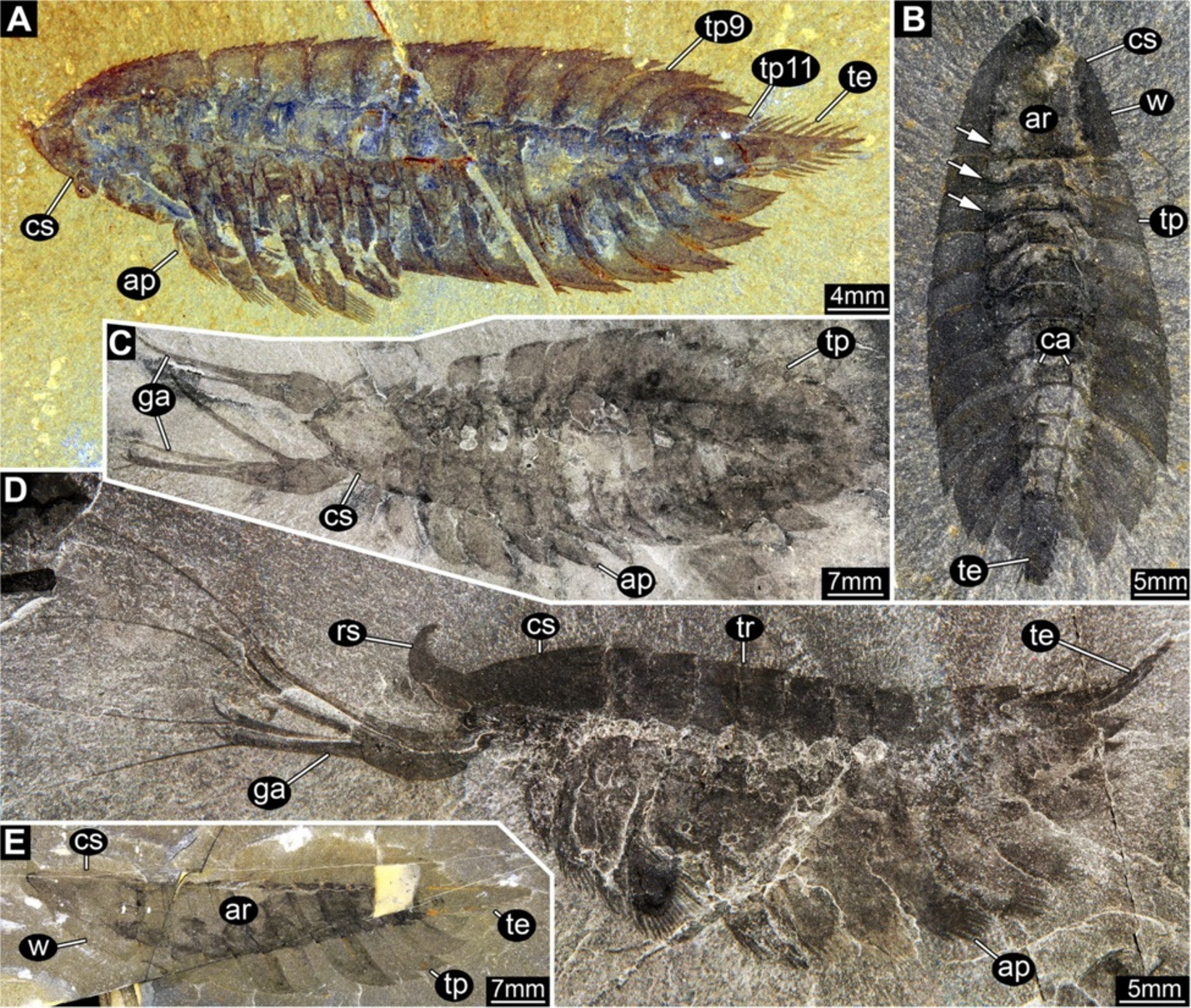
- Leanchoilia superlata
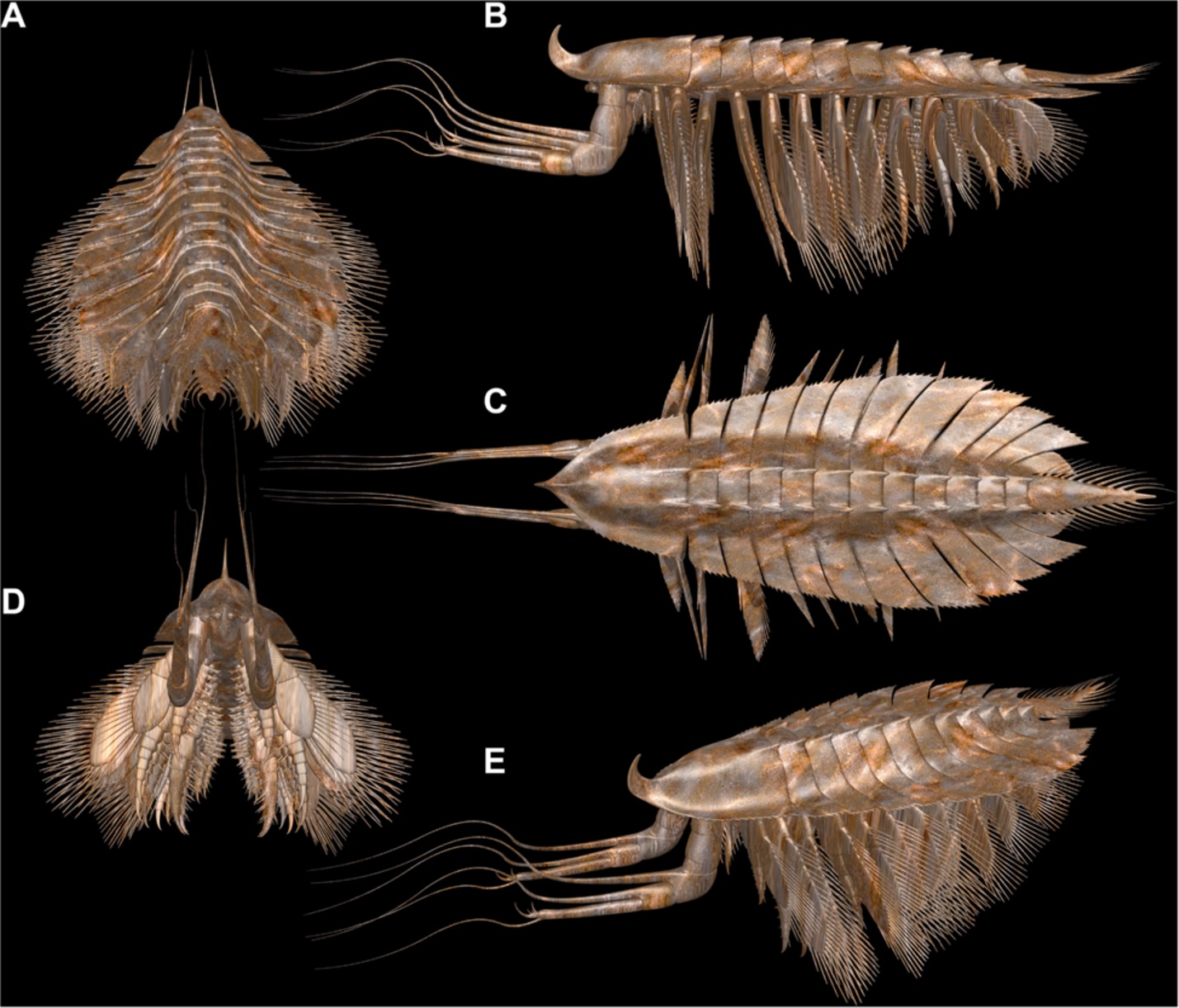
- Reconstruction of Leanchoilia superlata

Scientific classification
- Kingdom: Animalia
- Phylum: Arthropoda
- Class: †Megacheira
- Order: †Leanchoilida; Størmer, 1944
- Family: †Leanchoiliidae; Raymond, 1935
- Genus: †Leanchoilia; Walcott, 1912

Type species
- †Leanchoilia superlata Walcott, 1912

Other species
- †Leanchoilia illecebrosa (Hou, 1987); †Leanchoilia obesa He et al., 2017; †Leanchoilia persephone Simonetta, 1970; †Leanchoilia protogonia Simonetta, 1970; †Leanchoilia robisoni Babcock et al., 2012; †Leanchoilia? hanceyi Briggs et al., 2008; (but see text)

Synonyms
- Synonyms of Leanchoilia: Bidentia Walcott, 1912; Dianchia Luo & Hu, 1997; Zhongxinia Luo & Hu, 1997; Apiocephalus Luo & Hu, 1999; Synonyms of L. superlata: Bidentia difficilis Walcott, 1912; Emeraldella micrura Walcott, 1912; Leanchoilia amphiction Simonetta, 1970; Leanchoilia major Walcott, 1931; Synonyms of L. illecebrosa: Alalcomenaeus? illecebrosus Hou, 1987; Dianchia mirabilis Luo & Hu, 1997; Leancholilia asiatica Luo & Hu, 1997; Yohoia siniensis Luo & Hu, 1997; Zhongxinia speciosa Luo & Hu, 1997; Apiocephalus elegans Luo & Hu, 1999

= Leanchoilia =

Leanchoilia Temporal range: Cambrian Stage 3–Middle Cambrian

Extinct genus of arthropods

Leanchoilia is a megacheiran marine arthropod known from Cambrian deposits of the Burgess Shale in Canada and the Chengjiang biota of China.

== Description ==
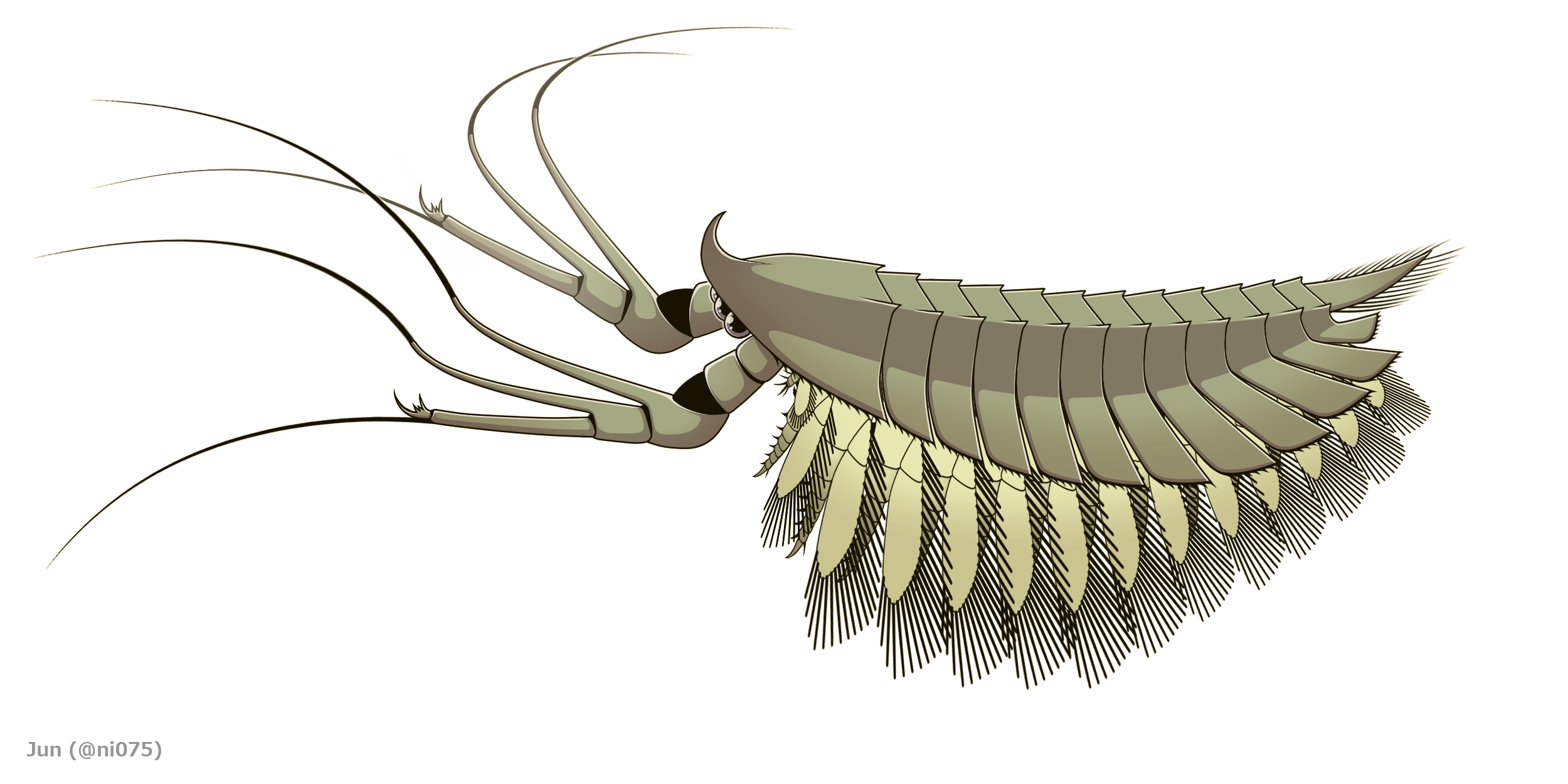
Restoration of Leanchoilia superlata

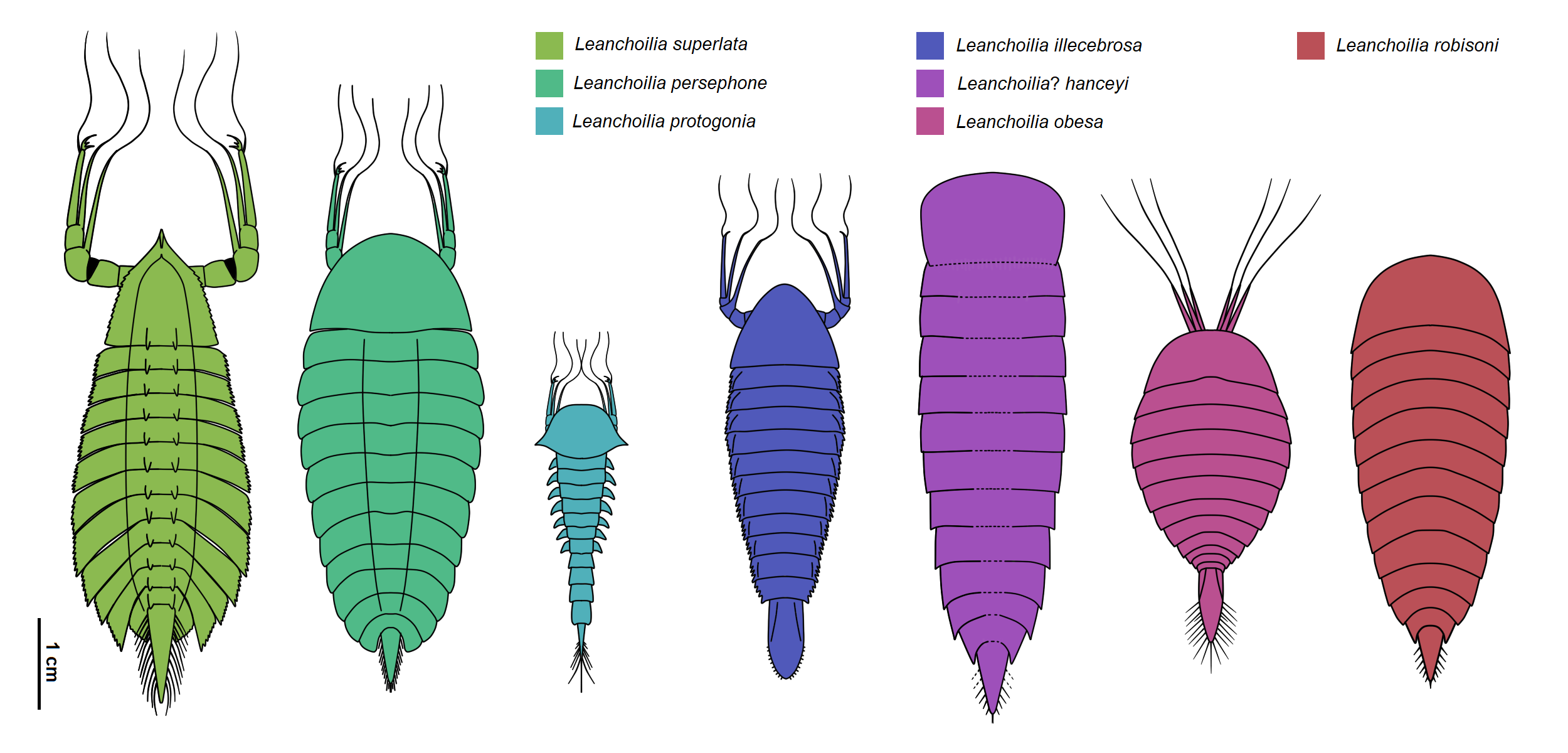
Comparison of the morphology of named Leanchoilia species, viewed from above

L. superlata was about 5 centimetres (2.0 in) long and had long, whip-like flagellae extending from its great appendages. Its internal organs are occasionally preserved within the substrate in three dimensions. Their two pairs of eyes are protected and covered by their exterior head shields, with two eyes being located on each side.

== Species ==
Seven species are tentatively accepted today: L. superlata (the type species), L. persephone and L. protogonia from the Burgess Shale, L. illecebrosa and L. obesa from the Chengjiang biota, ''L. robisoni from Kaili, and L.? hanceyi from the Spence Shale. L. superlata and L. persephone may however be examples of sexual dimorphism.

== Distribution ==
55 specimens of Leanchoilia are known from the Greater Phyllopod bed, where they comprise 0.1% of the community.

== See also ==
- Paleobiota of the Burgess Shale
- List of Chengjiang Biota species by phylum
