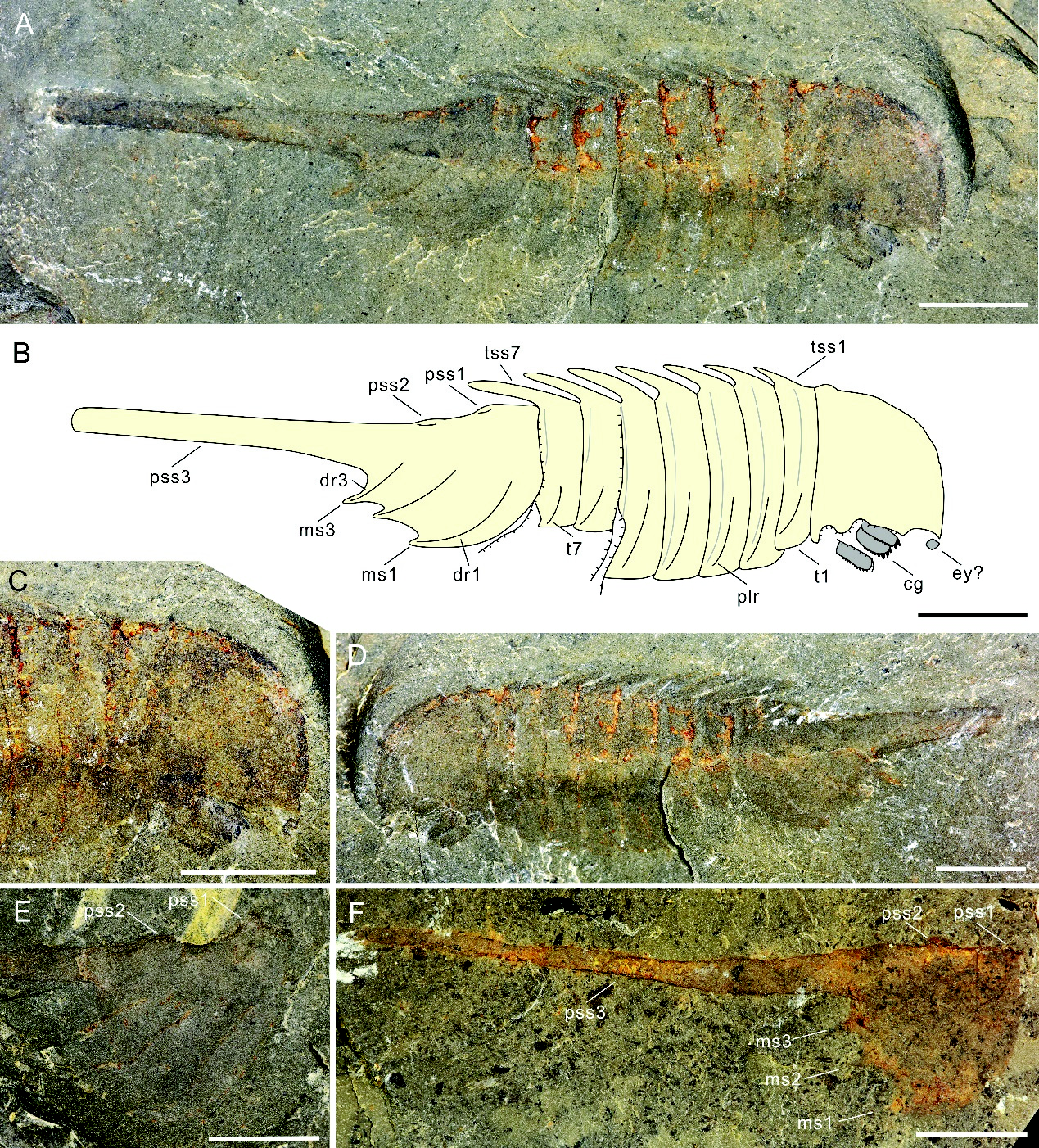
- Fossil and illustration of Thelxiope tangi
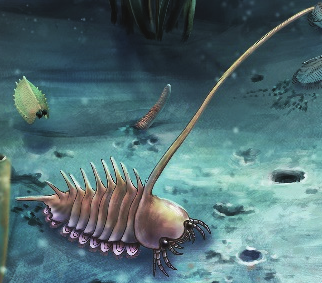
- Life restoration of Thelxiope spinosa

Scientific classification
- Kingdom: Animalia
- Phylum: Arthropoda
- Subphylum: Chelicerata
- Order: †Mollisoniida
- Genus: †Thelxiope; Simonetta & Delle Cave, 1975

Type species
- Thelxiope palaeothalassia Simonetta & Delle Cave, 1975

Other species
- Thelxiope holmani Lerosey-Aubril, Skabelund and Ortega-Hernández, 2020; Thelxiope spinosa (Conway Morris & Robison, 1988); Thelxiope tangi Sun. et al. 2022

Synonyms
- Ecnomocaris Conway Morris & Robison, 1988

= Thelxiope =

Thelxiope Temporal range: Cambrian Stage 5–Floian

Extinct genus of arthropods

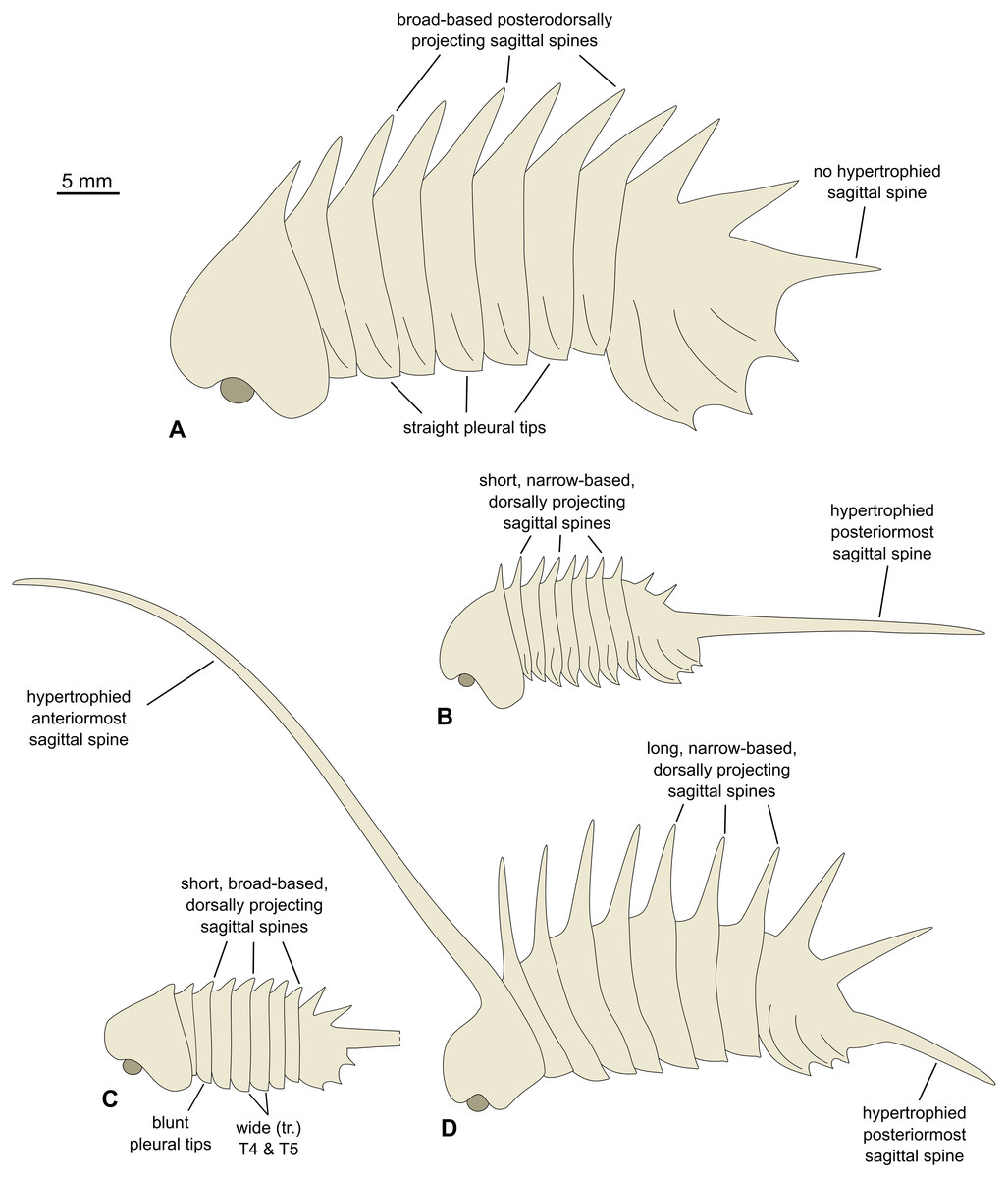
Comparison of 4 Thelxiope species, T. holmani (top, A) T. palaeothalassia (centre, B) Thelxiope sp. from the Fezouata Formation of Morocco (bottom left, C) T. spinosa (bottom right, D)

Thelxiope is a genus of Cambrian and Ordovician arthropod. Four named species are known, the type species T. palaeothalassia is known from the Burgess Shale, Canada T. holmani is from the Wheeler Shale of Utah, Thelxiope tangi from the Linyi Lagerstätte of Shandong, China, and T. spinosa, which is known from both the Linyi Lagerstätte and the Wheeler Shale. An indeterminate species is also known from the Ordovician (Floian) Fezouata Formation in Morocco. It is a member of Mollisoniida, alongside close relatives Mollisonia and Corcorania. They are suggested to be stem-chelicerates.
