= Percy Raymond =

American paleontologist (1879–1952)

Percy Edward Raymond
- Born: May 30, 1879; New Canaan, Connecticut, U.S.
- Died: May 17, 1952 (aged 72); Cambridge, Massachusetts, U.S.
- Education: Cornell University, Yale University
- Occupation: Paleontologist

Percy Edward Raymond (30 May 1879 – 17 May 1952) was an American geologist, paleontologist, and professor at Harvard University who specialized in the evolution of trilobites and studied fossils from the Burgess Shale.

== Life and scientific career ==
Raymond was born in New Canaan, Connecticut, son of George Edward and Harriet Frances née Beers. He studied at Cornell University and although aiming to become an engineer, became fascinated by lectures of Gilbert Dennison Harris. He then went on to study paleontology, receiving a PhD from Yale University in 1904 under the supervision of Charles Emerson Beecher. He worked at the Carnegie Museum and the Geological Survey of Canada before becoming an assistant professor at Harvard University and its Museum of Comparative Zoology in 1910. He worked there until his retirement in 1945, rising to the rank of full professor by 1929 and continuing on as an emeritus professor.

Raymond's major work was based on a rediscovery of the specimens in the Burgess Shale. The largest fossil collections had been made by Charles Doolittle Walcott and after his death in 1927, his collections, then thought to be exhaustive, were not allowed to be examined by his widow Mary Vaux Walcott. Raymond then re-examined the same region and found a major bed higher up which has been called the Raymond Quarry. Raymond examined trilobite evolution over time through morphology of specimens from various points in time. He especially looked at variations in the appendages and examined similarities with other groups including the insects, crustaceans and arachnids, exploring the apparent explosion of life forms in the Cambrian period.

Raymond was a Fellow of the Geological Society of America. He received a Walker Grand Prize of the Boston Society of Natural History in 1928 for his monograph on trilobites.

== Personal life ==
Raymond collected pewter and studied the history of early American pewterers and their methods. He co-founded the Pewter Collectors Club of America. His pewter-related research papers are held by the Winterthur Museum, Garden and Library.

Raymond died at Mount Auburn Hospital in Cambridge, Massachusetts, at the age of 72. His wife Eva Grace (née Goodenough) and daughter Ruth Elspeth survived him.
