= Corcorania =

Corcorania Temporal range: Tremadocian

Scientific classification
- Kingdom: Animalia
- Phylum: Arthropoda
- Subphylum: Chelicerata
- Order: †Mollisoniida
- Family: †Corcoraniidae
- Genus: †Corcorania; Jell, 1980
- Species: †C. trispinosa

Binomial name
- †Corcorania trispinosa Jell, 1980

Genus of Ordovician arthropod

Corcorania is a genus of mollisoniid arthropod from the early Lancefieldian of Australia. It contains one species, Corcorania trispinosa.

== Description ==
Corcorania has a semioval head shield with rounded posterolateral corners and a somewhat truncated appearance from lateral view. Three slightly curved anterior spines extend from the margin of this shield, with the more lateral two being longest. The posterior ventral part of the shield has strong projections, likely for anchoring soft tissue. The trunk consists of seven segments decreasing in size posteriorly. The posterior shield is slightly smaller than the anterior with a subtriangular shape. Appendages are rarely preserved, with only a few known. Possible furcal rami are known from some specimens however these are unclear. A spine protruding from beneath the right side of the first trunk segment is the only evidence of appendages, however several disassociated ones are known. The most common type of appendage is semicircular with three curved spines on its rounded margin, although a spinier and more rectangular type is also known.

== Etymology ==
Corcorania honours the Corcoran family, who helped the discoverer with finding the fossils. The species name trispinosa references the three spines on the head shield.
