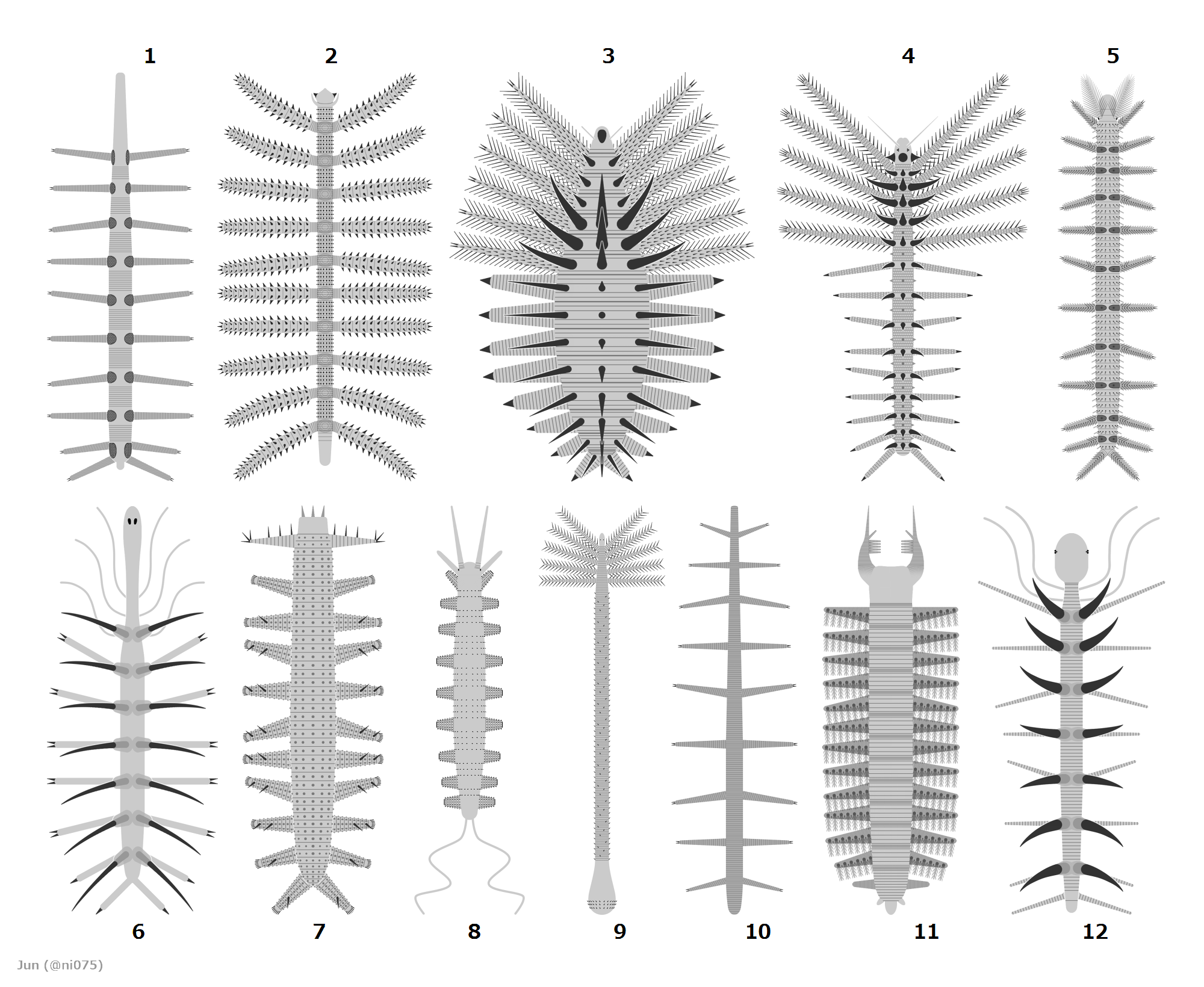
- Reconstruction of various lobopodians. 1: Microdictyon sinicum, 2: Diania cactiformis, 3: Collinsovermis monstruosus, 4: Luolishania longicruris, 5: Onychodictyon ferox, 6: Hallucigenia sparsa, 7: Aysheaia pedunculata, 8: Antennacanthopodia gracilis, 9: Facivermis yunnanicus, 10: Paucipodia inermis, 11: Jianshanopodia decora, 12: Hallucigenia fortis

Scientific classification
- Kingdom: Animalia
- Subkingdom: Eumetazoa
- Clade: ParaHoxozoa
- Clade: Bilateria
- Clade: Nephrozoa
- Clade: Protostomia
- Superphylum: Ecdysozoa
- Clade: Panarthropoda
- Phylum: †Lobopodia; Snodgrass 1938

Groups included
- † "Xenusia"; † Hallucigeniidae; † Luolishaniidae; † Aysheaiidae; † Paucipodiidae; † Xenusiidae; † Pambdelurion and † Kerygmachelidae (excluded in some usages); Onychophora (in some usages); Tardigrada (in some usages); Arthropoda (in some usages)

Cladistically included but traditionally excluded taxa
- Crown-group Euarthropoda

Synonyms
- Lobopoda Cavalier-Smith (1998)

= Lobopodia =

Lobopodia Temporal range: Cambrian Series 2–Gzhelian Descendant taxa Onychophora, Tardigrada, and Euarthropoda survive to Recent, possible Ediacaran ichnofossils

Group of extinct worm-like animals with legs

Lobopodians are members of the informal group Lobopodia (from Ancient Greek λοβός [lobós] 'lobe' and πόδα [póda] 'foot'), or the formally erected phylum Lobopoda Cavalier-Smith (1998). They are panarthropods with stubby legs called lobopods, a term which may also be used as a common name of this group as well. While the definition of lobopodians may differ between literatures, it usually refers to a group of soft-bodied, marine (and freshwater) worm-like fossil panarthropods such as Aysheaia and Hallucigenia. However, other genera like Kerygmachela and Pambdelurion (which have features similar to other groups) are often referred to as "gilled lobopodians".

The oldest near-complete fossil lobopodians date to the Lower Cambrian; some are also known from Ordovician, Silurian and Carboniferous Lagerstätten. Some bear toughened claws, plates or spines, which are commonly preserved as carbonaceous or mineralized microfossils in Cambrian strata. The grouping is considered to be paraphyletic, as the three living panarthropod groups (Arthropoda, Tardigrada and Onychophora) are thought to have evolved from lobopodian ancestors.

== Definitions ==
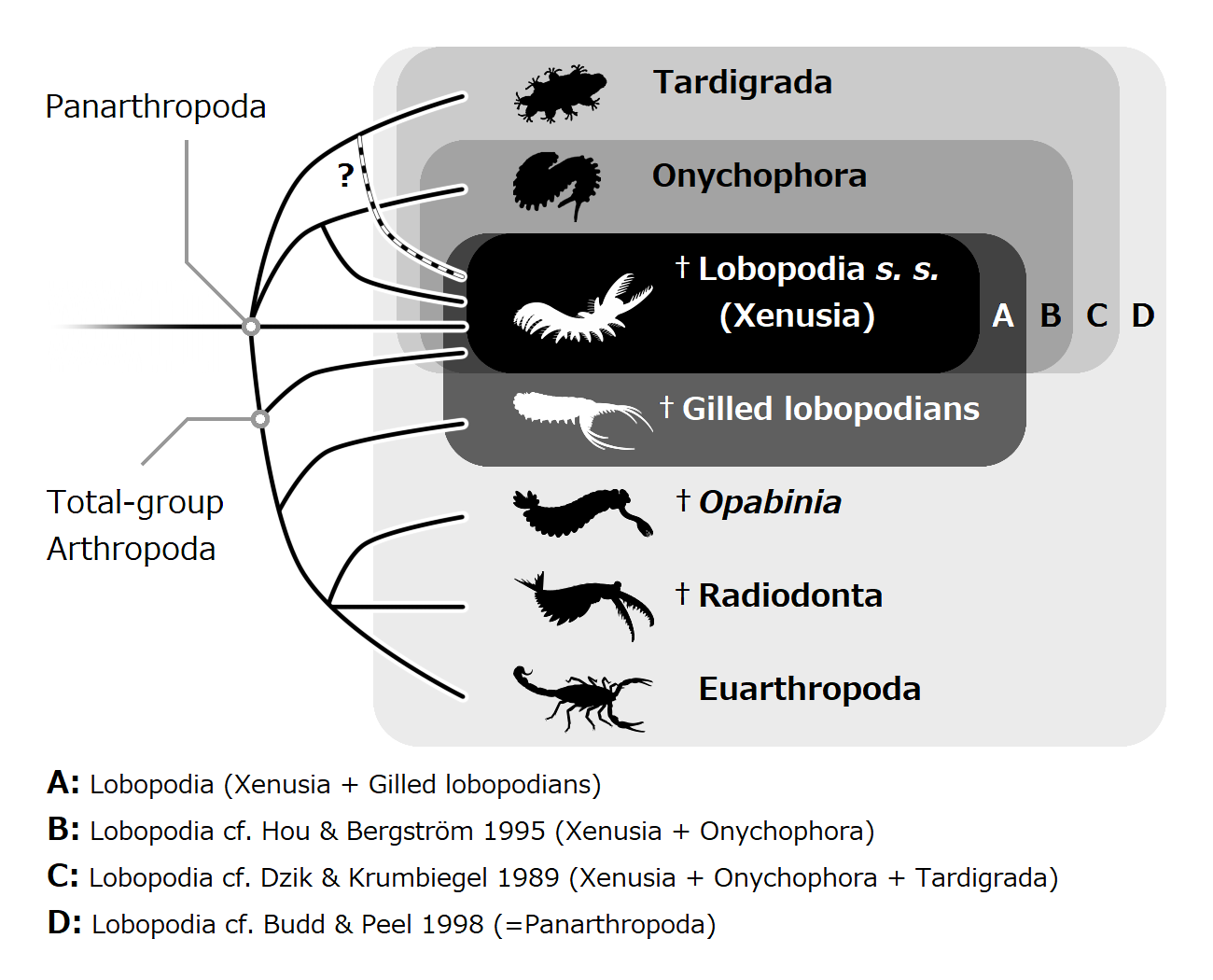
Various definitions of lobopodians within Panarthropoda.

The lobopodian concept varies from author to author. Its most general sense refers to a suite of mainly Cambrian worm-like panarthropod taxa possessing lobopods – for example, Aysheaia, Hallucigenia, and Xenusion – which were traditionally united as "Xenusians" or "Xenusiids" (class Xenusia). Certain dinocaridid genera, such as Opabinia, Pambdelurion, and Kerygmachela, may also be regarded as lobopodians, sometimes referred to more specifically as "gilled lobopodians" or "gilled lobopods". This traditional, informal usage of "Lobopodia" treats it as an evolutionary grade, including only extinct panarthropods near the base of crown Panarthropoda. Crown Panarthropoda comprises the three extant Panarthropod phyla – Onychophora (velvet worms), Tardigrada (waterbears), and Arthropoda (arthropods) – as well as their most recent common ancestor and all of its descendants. Thus, in this usage, Lobopodia consists of various basal panarthropods. This corresponds to "A" in the image to the left.

An alternative, broader definition of Lobopodia would also incorporate Onychophora and Tardigrada, the two living panarthropod phyla which still bear lobopodous limbs. This definition, corresponding to "C", is a morphological one, depending on the superficial similarity of appendages (the "lobopods"). Thus, it is paraphyletic, excluding the euarthropods, which are descendants of certain lobopodians, on the basis of their highly divergent limb morphology. "Lobopodia" has also been used to refer to a proposed sister clade to Arthropoda, consisting of the extant Onychophora and Tardigrada, as well as their most recent common ancestor and all of its descendants. This definition renders Lobopodia a monophyletic taxon, if indeed it is valid (that is, if Tardigrada and Onychophora are closer to one another than either is to Arthropoda), but would exclude all the euarthropod-line taxa traditionally considered lobopodians. Its validity is uncertain, however, as there are a number of hypotheses regarding the internal phylogeny of Panarthropoda. The broadest definition treats Lobopodia as a monophyletic superphylum equivalent in circumscription to Panarthropoda. By this definition, represented by "D" in the image, Lobopodia is no longer treated as an evolutionary grade but as a clade, containing not only the early, superficially "lobopodian" forms but also all of their descendants, including the extant Panarthropods.

Lobopodia has, historically, sometimes included Pentastomida, a group of parasitic panarthropods which were traditionally thought to be a unique phylum, but revealed by subsequent phylogenomic and anatomical studies to be a highly specialized taxon of crustaceans.

== Representative taxa ==
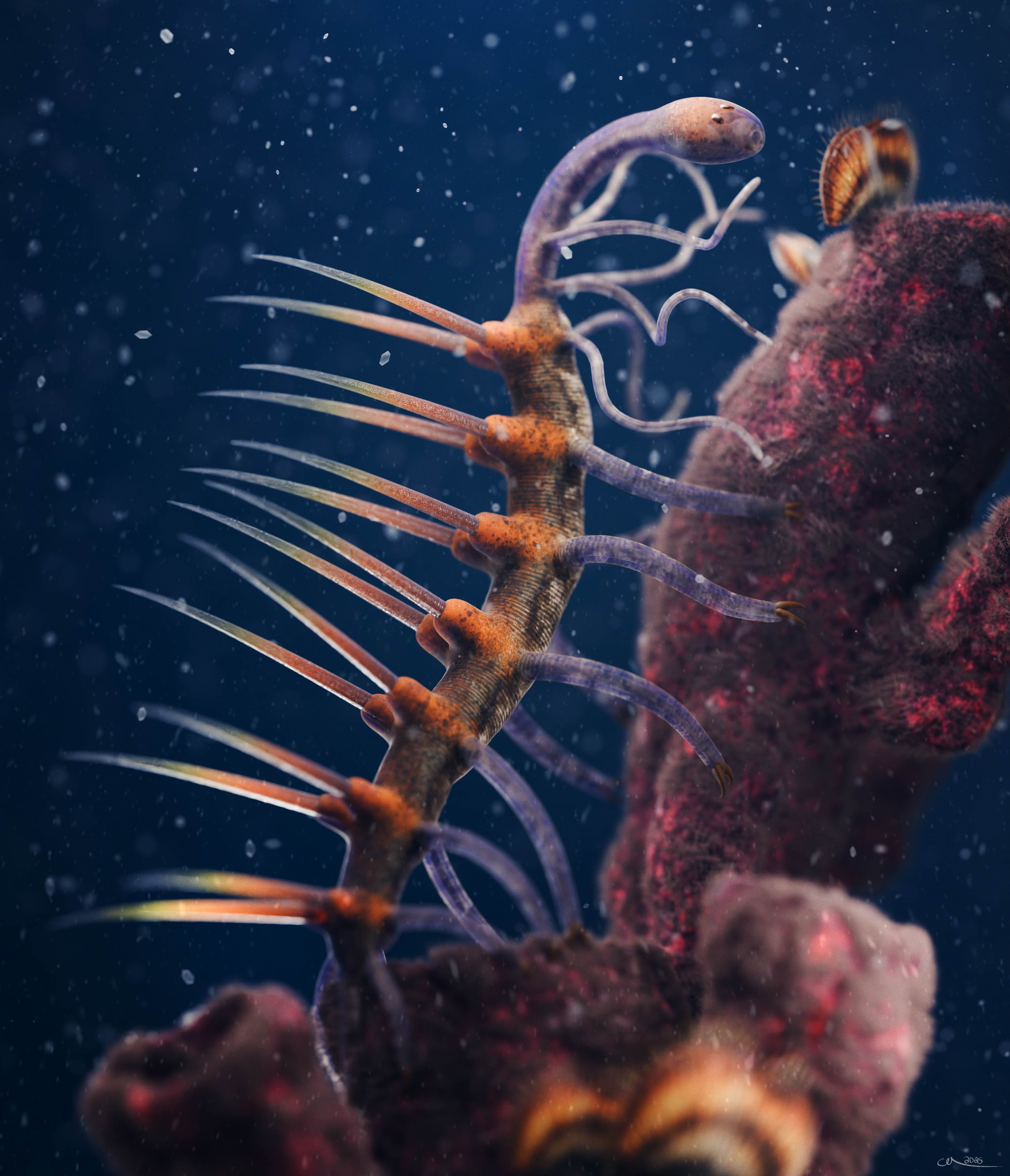
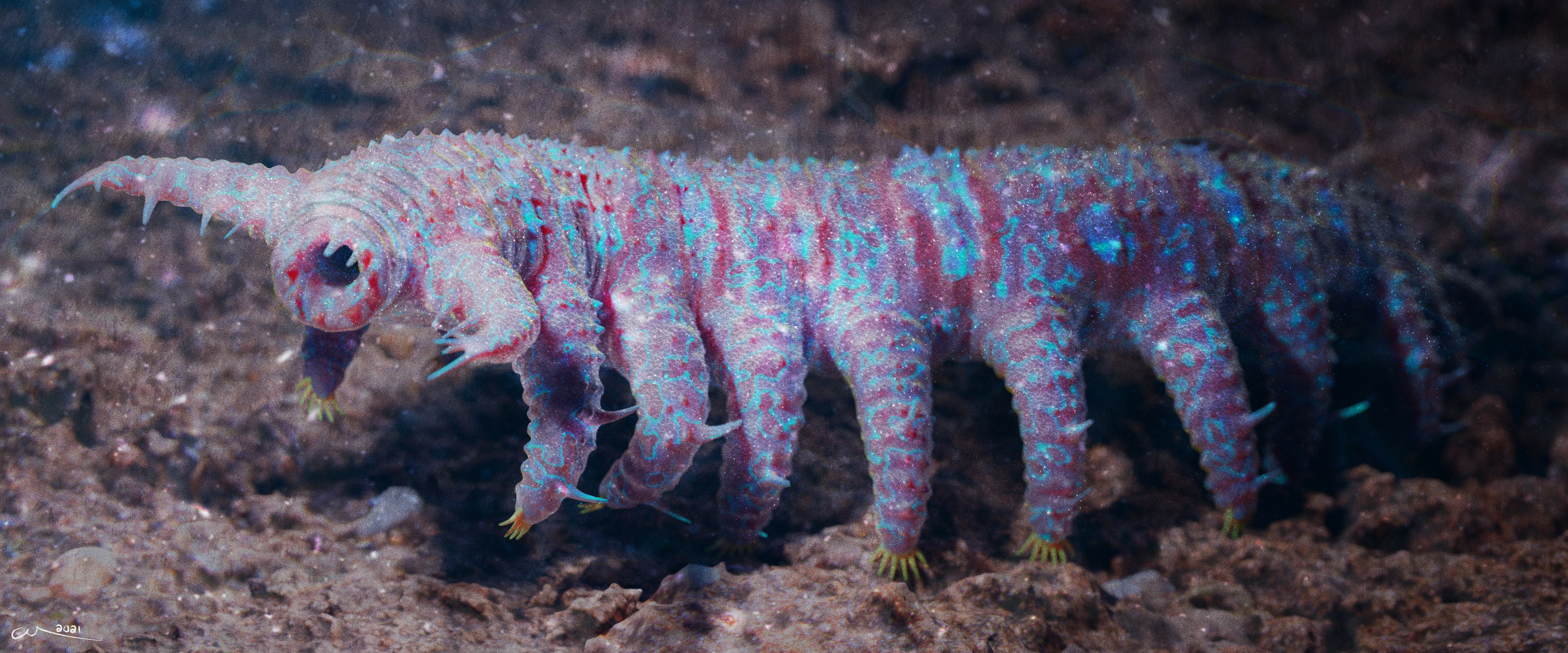
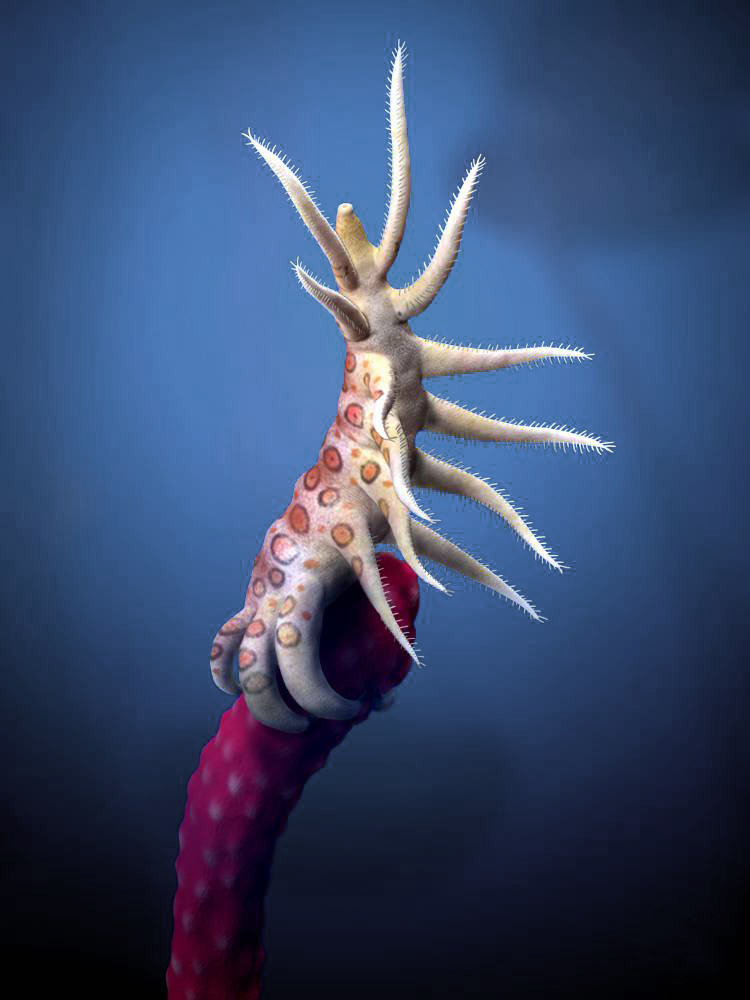
Hallucigenia sparsa, (left/top) Aysheaia pedunculata (centre), and Ovatiovermis cribratus (right/bottom), showing the range of morphological diversity of lobopodians

The better-known genera include Aysheaia, which was discovered in the Canadian Burgess Shale, and Hallucigenia, known from both the Chenjiang Maotianshan Shale and the Burgess Shale. Aysheaia pedunculata has a morphology apparently basic for lobopodians — for example, a significantly annulated cuticle, a terminal mouth opening, specialized frontalmost appendages, and stubby lobopods with terminal claws. Hallucigenia sparsa is famous for having a complex history of interpretation — it was originally reconstructed with long, stilt-like legs and mysterious fleshy dorsal protuberances, and was long considered a prime example of the way in which nature experimented with the most diverse and bizarre body designs during the Cambrian. However, further discoveries showed that this reconstruction had placed the animal upside-down: interpreting the "stilts" as dorsal spines made it clear that the fleshy "dorsal" protuberances were actually elongated lobopods. More recent reconstruction even exchanged the front and rear ends of the animal: it was revealed that the bulbous imprint previously thought to be a head was actually gut contents being expelled from the anus.

Microdictyon is another charismatic as well as the speciose genus of lobopodians resembling Hallucigenia, but instead of spines, it bore pairs of net-like plates, which are often found disarticulated and are known as an example of small shelly fossils (SSF). Xenusion has the oldest fossil record amongst the described lobopodians, which may trace back to Cambrian Stage 2. Luolishania is an iconic example of lobopodians with multiple pairs of specialized appendages. The gill lobopodians Kerygmachela and Pambdelurion shed light on the relationship between lobopodians and arthropods, as they have both lobopodian affinities and characteristics linked to the arthropod stem-group.

== Morphology ==
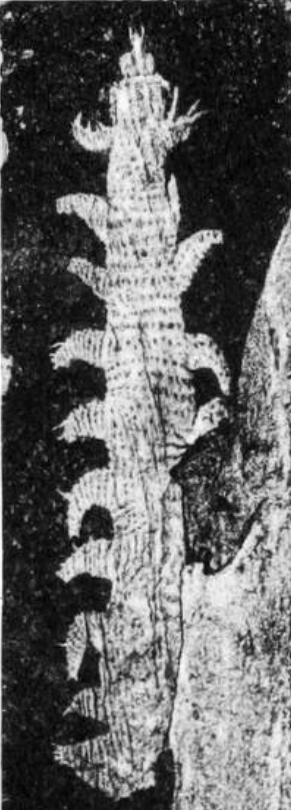
Complete fossil of Aysheaia pedunculata, showing overall morphology.

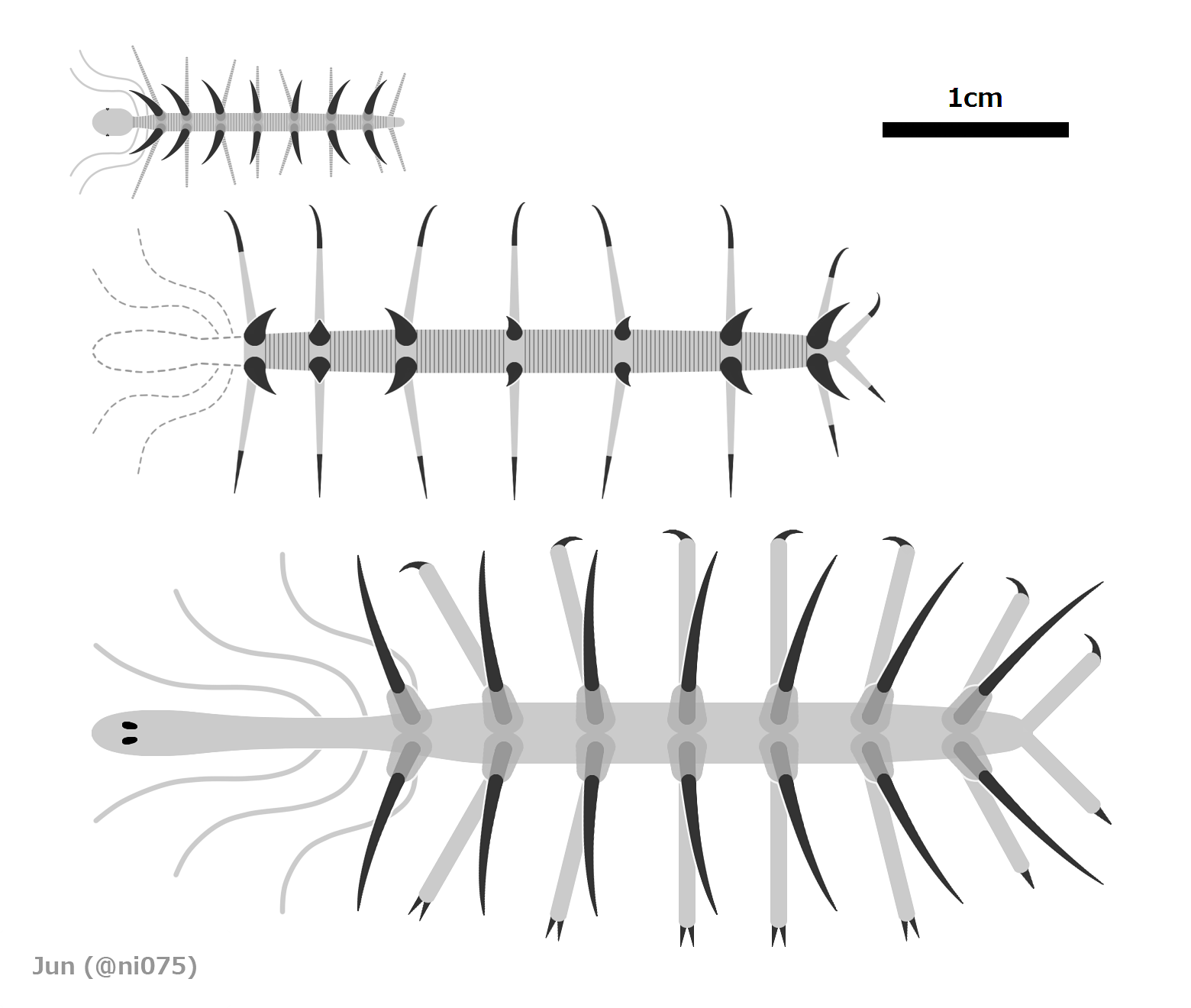
Maximum size of the 3 species of Hallucigenia (from top, H. fortis, H. hongmeia and H. sparsa) in scale.

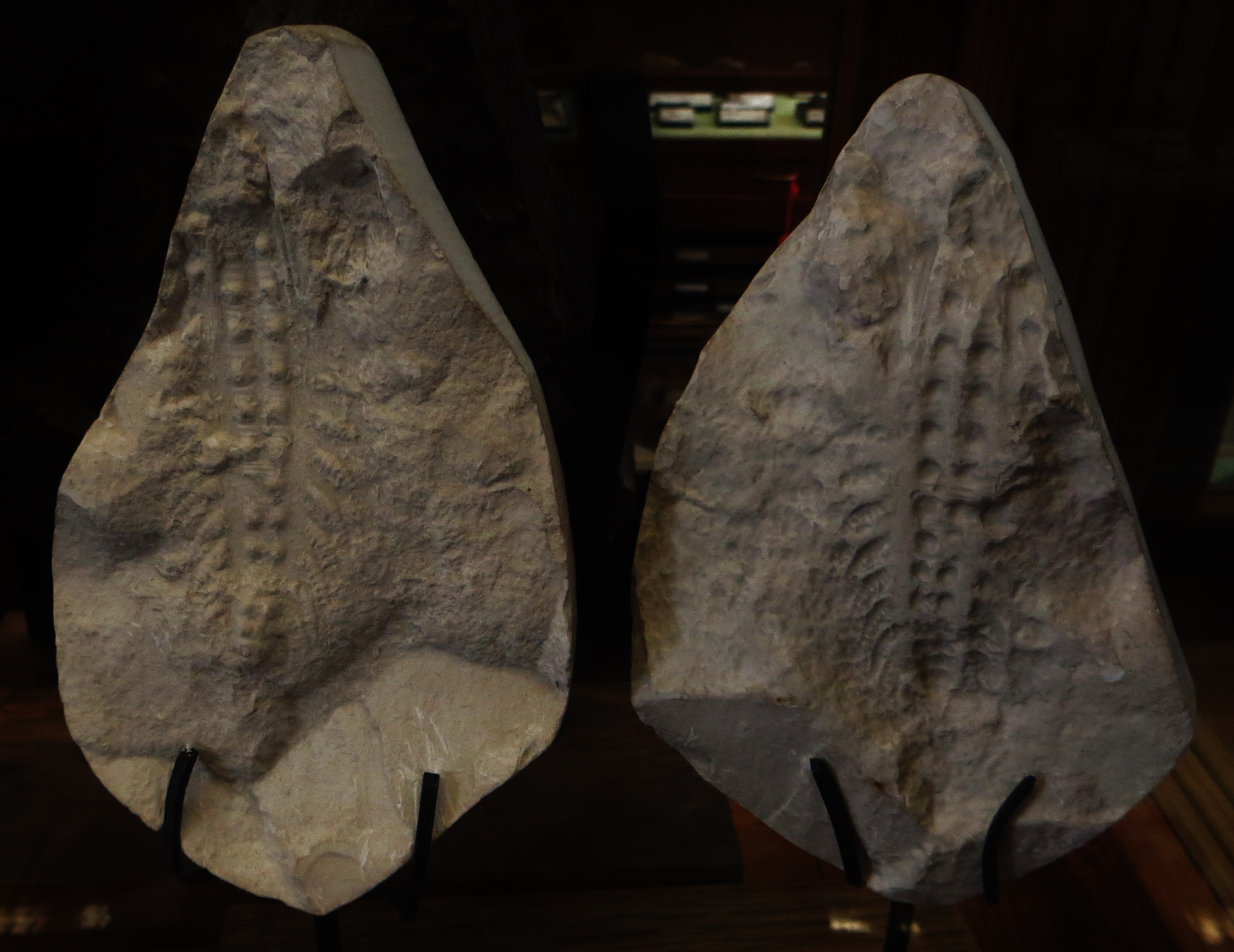
Fossils of Xenusion, a lobopodian that might have grown up to 20 centimeters.

Most lobopodians were only a few centimeters in length, while some genera grew up to over 20 centimeters. Their bodies are annulated, although the presence of annulation may differ between position or taxa, and sometimes difficult to discern due to their close spacing and low relief on the fossil materials. Body and appendages are circular in cross-section.

=== Head ===
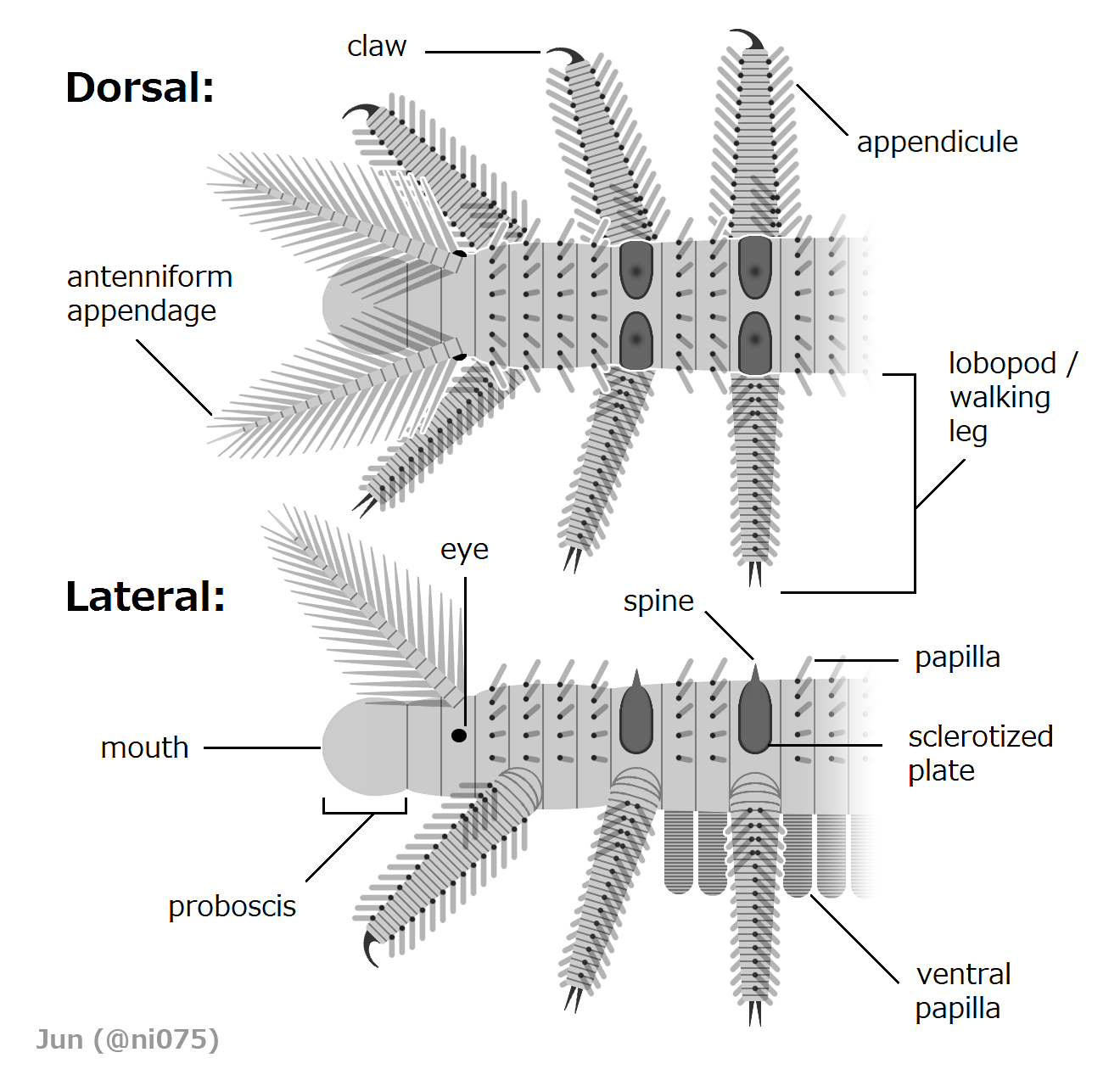
Anterior section of Onychodictyon ferox, showing head structures.

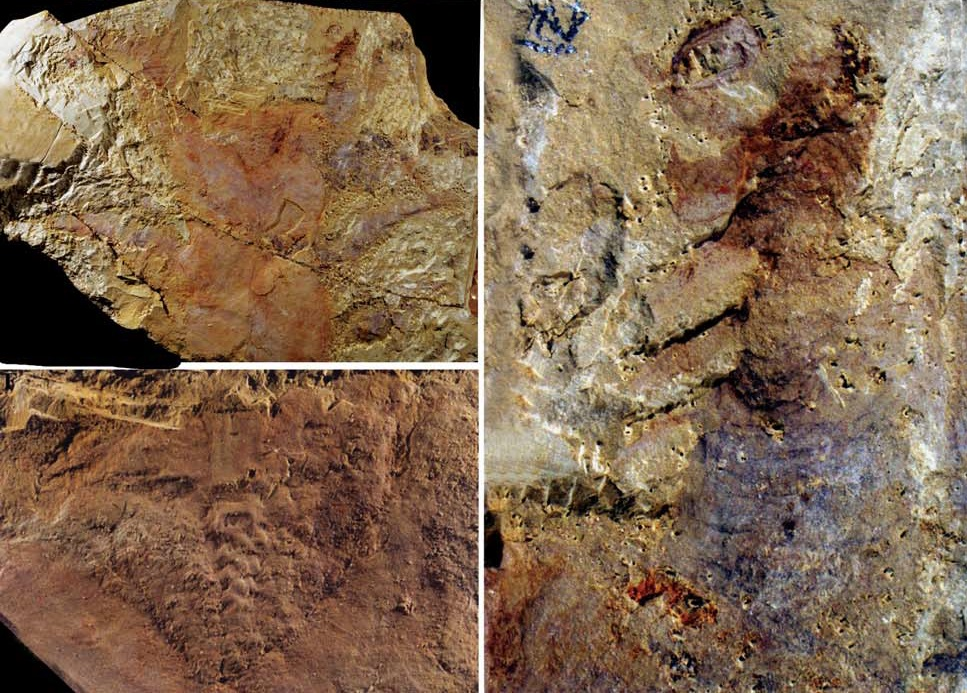
Fossil of Jianshanopodia decora, showing head region (upper left) compose of robust frontal appendage (right) and pharynx with rows of teeth (bottom left).

Due to the usually poor preservation, detailed reconstructions of the head region are only available for a handful of lobopodian species. The head of a lobopodian is more or less bulbous, and sometime possesses a pair of pre-ocular, presumely protocerebral appendages – for example, primary antennae or well-developed frontal appendages, which are individualized from the trunk lobopods (with the exception of Antennacanthopodia, which have two pairs of head appendages instead of one). Mouthparts may consist of rows of teeth or a conical proboscis. The eyes may be represented by a single ocellus or by numerous pairs of simple ocelli, as has been shown in Luolishania (=Miraluolishania), Ovatiovermis, Onychodictyon, Hallucigenia, Facivermis, and less certainly Aysheaia as well. However, in gilled lobopodians like Kerygmachela, the eyes are relatively complex reflective patches that may had been compound in nature.

=== Trunk and lobopods ===
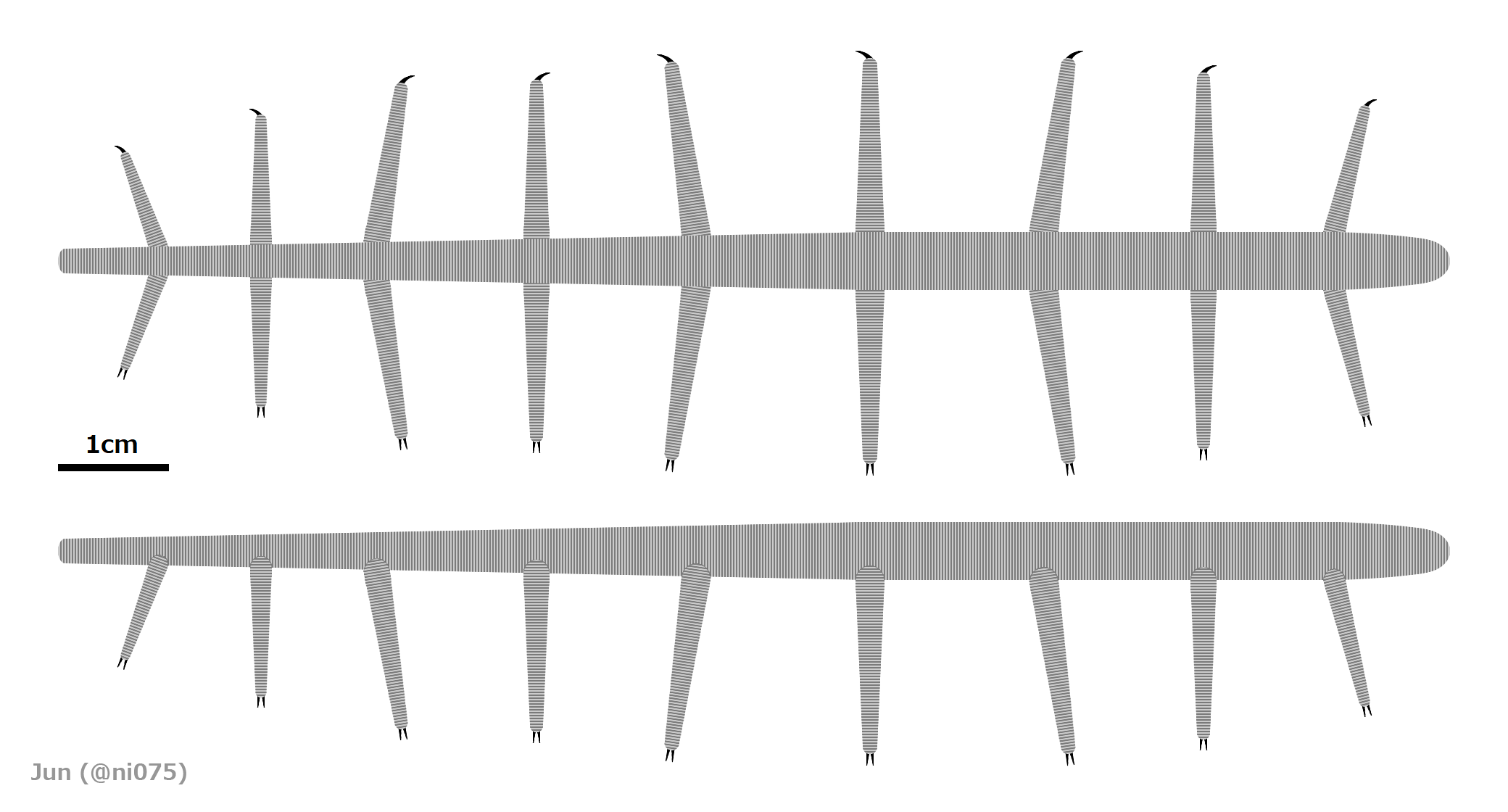
Paucipodia inermis, a lobopodian with featureless, undifferentiated trunk region.

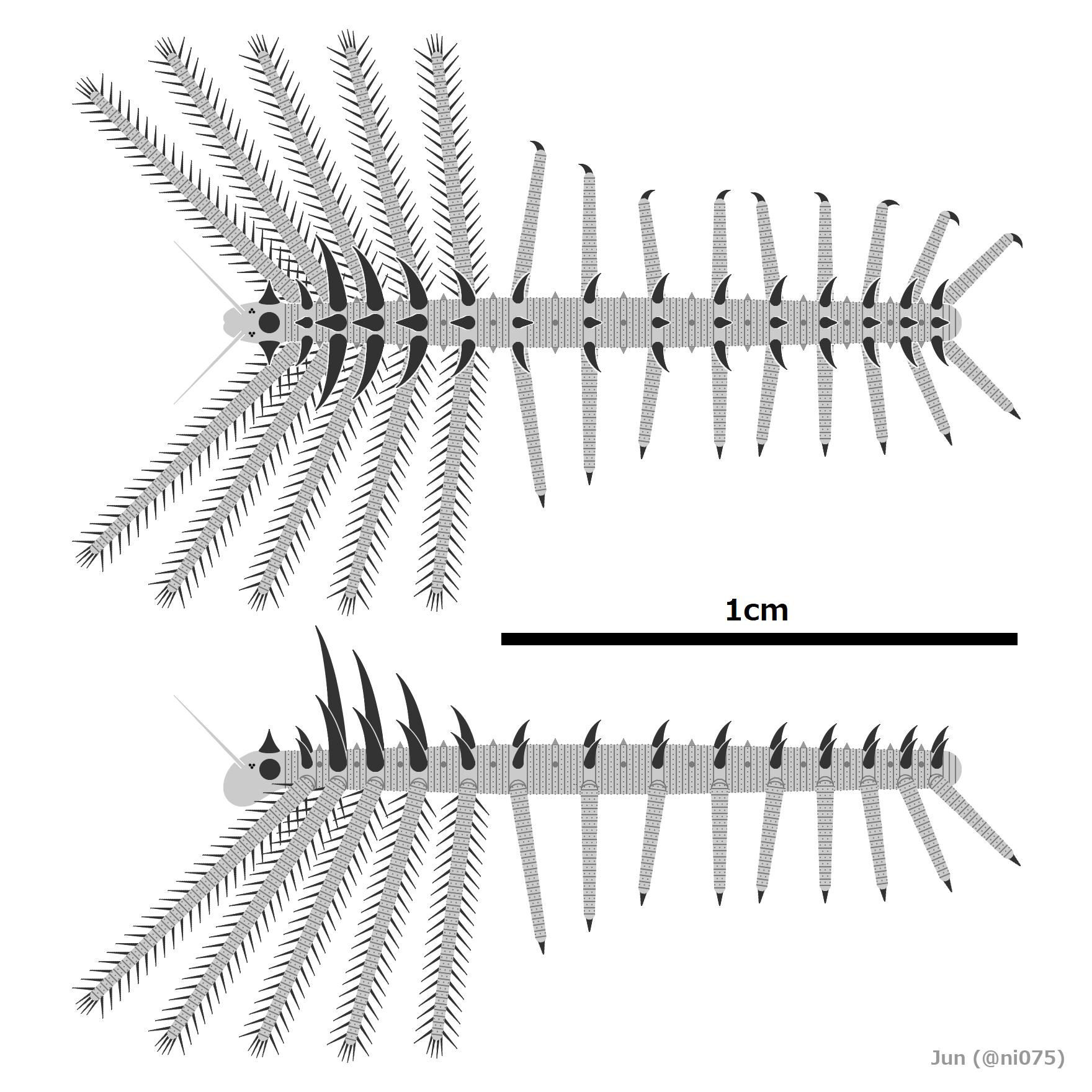
Luolishania longicruris, showing clear differentiation between trunk segments and lobopods.

The trunk is elongated and composed of numerous body segments (somites), each bearing a pair of legs called lobopods or lobopodous limbs. The segmental boundaries are not as externally significant as those of arthropods, although they are indicated by heteronomous annulations (i.e., the alternation of annulation density corresponding to the position of segmental boundaries) in some species. The trunk segments may bear other external, segment-corresponding structures such as nodes (e.g. Hadranax, Kerygmachela), papillae (e.g. Onychodictyon), spine/plate-like sclerites (e.g. armoured lobopodians) or lateral flaps (e.g. gilled lobopodians). One member of Lobopodia, Palaeocampa, has spines which seem to have been poisonous as shown by preserved exudates at their tips, with FTIR (Fourier-transform spectrometry analysis) showing the secretions likely contained aldehydes. The trunk may terminate with a pair of lobopods (e.g. Aysheaia, Hallucigenia sparsa) or a tail-like extension (e.g. Paucipodia, Siberion, Jianshanopodia).

The lobopods are flexible and loosely conical in shape, tapering from the body to tips that may or may not bear claws. The claws, if present, are hardened structures with a shape resembling a hook or gently curved spine. Claw-bearing lobopods usually have two claws, but single claws are known (e.g. posterior lobopods of luolishaniids), as are more than two (e.g. three in Tritonychus, seven in Aysheaia) depending on its segmental or taxonomical association. In some genera, the lobopods bear additional structures such as spines (e.g. Diania), fleshy outgrowths (e.g. Onychodictyon), or tubercules (e.g. Jianshanopodia). There is no sign of arthropodization (development of a hardened exoskeleton and segmental division on panarthropod appendages) in known members of lobopodians, even for those belonging to the arthropod stem-group (e.g. gilled lobopodians and siberiids), and the suspected case of arthropodization on the limbs of Diania is considered to be a misinterpretation.

Differentiation (tagmosis) between trunk somites barely occurs, except in hallucigeniids and luolishaniids, where numerous pairs of their anterior lobopods are significantly slender (hallucigeniids) or setose (luolishaniids) in contrast to their posterior counterparts.

=== Internal structures ===
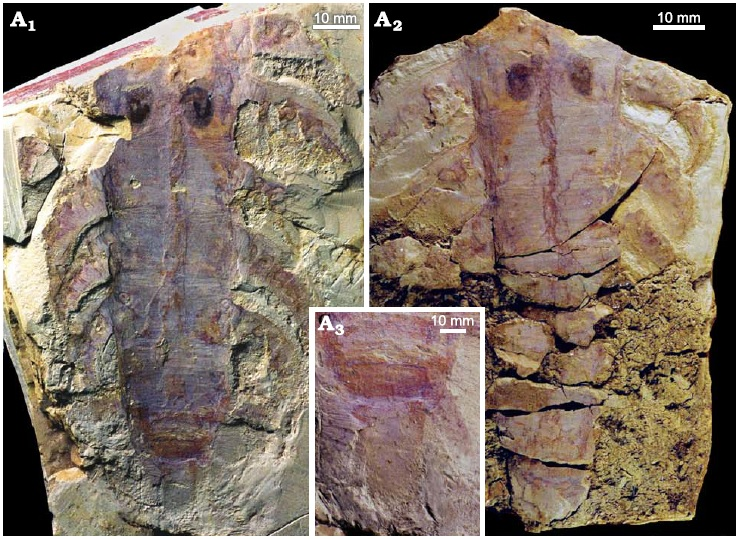
Fossilized posterior trunk region of Jianshanopodia decora, showing traces of lobopods, gut diverculae and lobe-like terminal extension.

The gut of lobopodians is often straight, undifferentiated, and sometimes preserved in the fossil record in three dimensions. In some specimens the gut is found to be filled with sediment. The gut consists of a central tube occupying the full length of the lobopodian's trunk, which does not change much in width - at least not systematically. However, in some groups, specifically the gilled lobopodians and siberiids, the gut is surrounded by pairs of serially repeated, kidney-shaped gut diverticulae (digestive glands). In some specimens, parts of the lobopodian gut can be preserved in three dimensions. This cannot result from phosphatisation, which is usually responsible for 3-D gut preservation, because the phosphate content of the guts is under 1%; the contents comprise quartz and muscovite. The gut of the representative Paucipodia is variable in width, being widest at the centre of the body. Its position in the body cavity is only loosely fixed, so flexibility is possible.

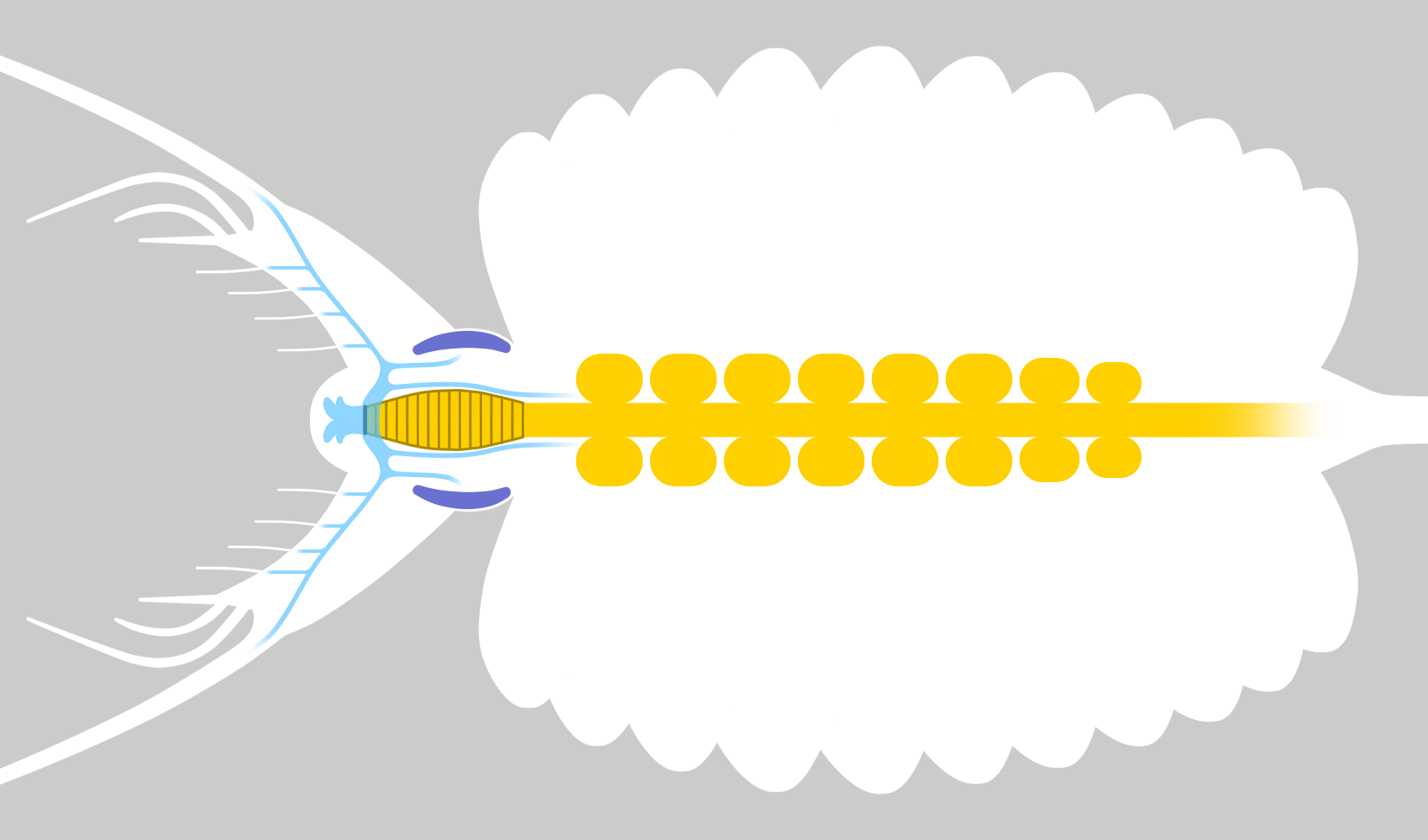
Eyes (deep blue), brain (light blue) and digestive system (yellow) of Kerygmachela.

Not much is known about the neural anatomy of lobopodians due to the spare and mostly ambiguous fossil evidence. Possible traces of a nervous system were found in Paucipodia, Megadictyon and Antennacanthopodia. The first and so far the only confirmed evidence of lobopodian neural structures comes from the gilled lobopodian Kerygmachela in Park et al. 2018 — it presents a brain composed of only a protocerebrum (the frontal-most cerebral ganglion of panarthropods) that is directly connected to the nerves of eyes and frontal appendages, suggesting the protocerebral ancestry of the head of lobopodians as well as the whole Panarthropoda.

In some extant ecdysozoan such as priapulids and onychophorans, there is a layer of outermost circular muscles and a layer of innermost longitudinal muscles. The onychophorans also have a third, intermediate, layer of interwoven oblique muscles. Musculature of the gilled lobopodian Pambdelurion shows a similar anatomy, but that of the lobopodian Tritonychus shows the opposite pattern: it is the outermost muscles that are longitudinal and the innermost layer that consists of circular muscles.

== Categories ==
Based on external morphology, lobopodians may fall under different categories — for example the general worm-like taxa as "xenusiid" or "xenusian"; xenusiid with sclerite as "armoured lobopodians"; and taxa with both robust frontal appendages and lateral flaps as "gilled lobopodians". Some of them were originally defined under a taxonomic sense (e.g. class Xenusia), but neither any of them are generally accepted as monophyletic in further studies.

=== Armoured lobopodians ===
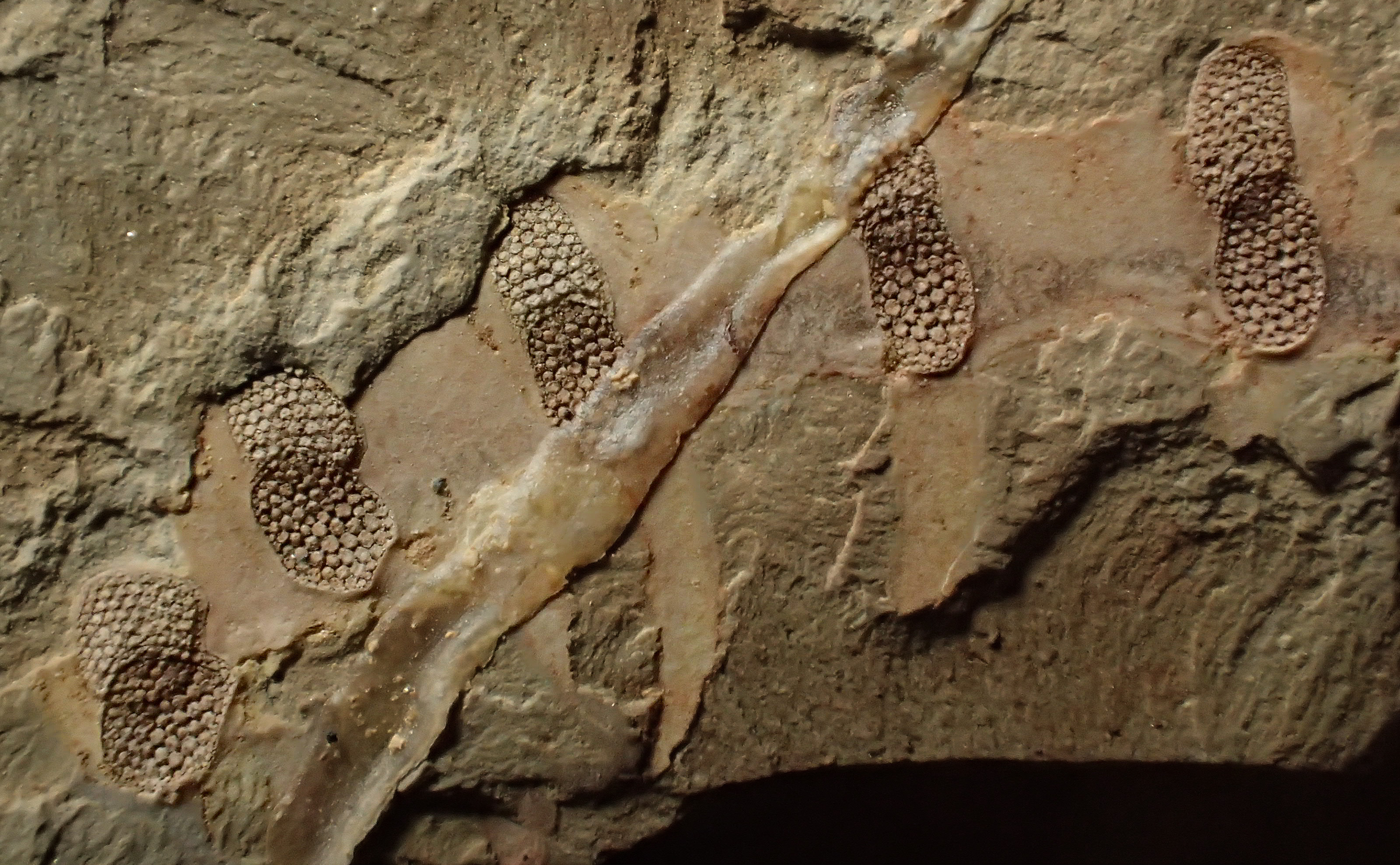
Fossil of Microdictyon sinicum, showing pairs of sclerite and trace of trunk and lobopods.

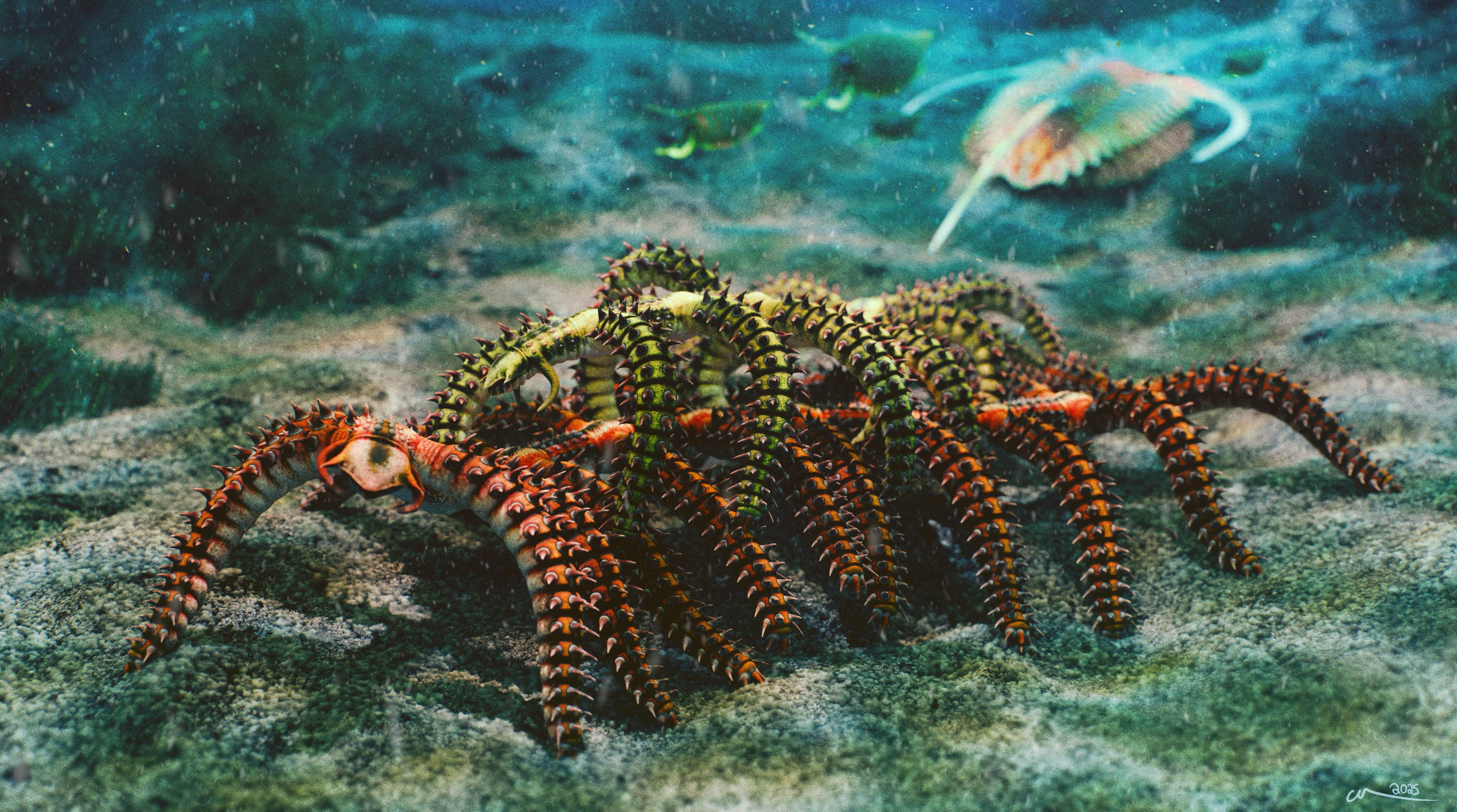
Diania cactiformis, an armoured lobopodian covered by myriad spines.

Armoured lobopodians referred to xenusiid lobopodians which bore repeated sclerites such as spine or plates on their trunk (e.g. Hallucigenia, Microdictyon, Luolishania) or lobopods (e.g. Diania). In contrast, lobopodians without sclerites may be referred to as "unarmoured lobopodians". Function of the sclerites were interpreted as protective armor and/or muscle attachment points. In some cases, only the disarticulated sclerites of the animal were preserved, which represented as component of small shelly fossils (SSF). Armoured lobopodians were suggest to be onychophoran-related and may even represent a clade in some previous studies, but their phylogenetic positions in later studies are controversial. (see text)

=== Gilled lobopodians ===
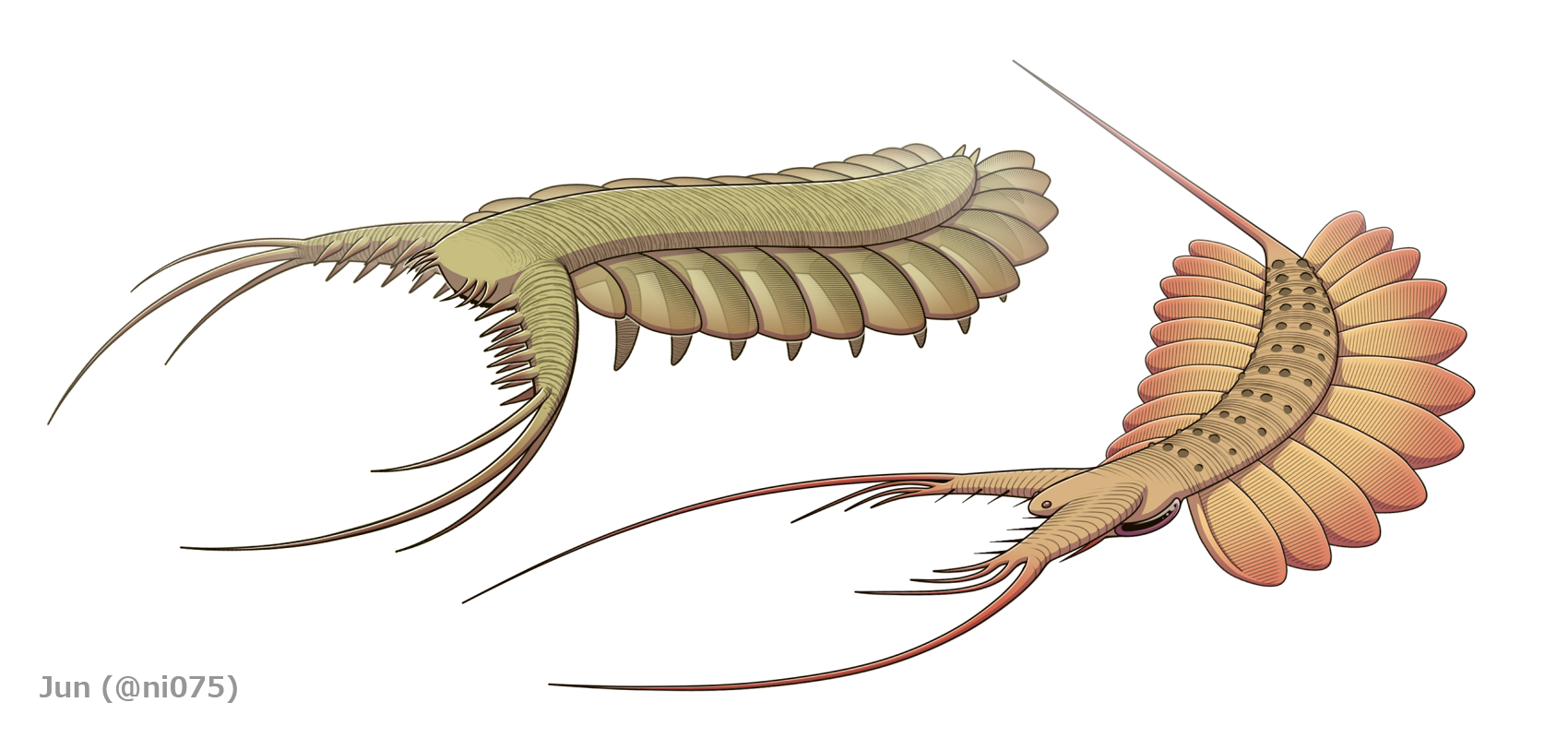
The gilled lobopodians Pambdelurion (top left) and Kerygmachela (bottom right).

Dinocaridids with lobopodian affinities (due to shared features like annulation and lobopods) are referred to as "gilled lobopodians" or "gilled lobopods". These forms sport a pair of flaps on each trunk segment, but otherwise no signs of arthropodization, in contrast to more derived dinocaridids like the Radiodonta that have robust and sclerotized frontal appendages. Gilled lobopodians cover at least four genera: Pambdelurion, Kerygmachela, Utahnax and Mobulavermis. Opabinia may also fall under this category in a broader sense, although the presence of lobopods in this genus is not definitively proven. Omnidens, a genus known only from Pambdelurion-like mouthparts and distal parts of the frontal appendages, may also be a gilled lobopodian. The body flaps may have functioned as both swimming appendages and gills, and are possibly homologous to the dorsal flaps of radiodonts and exites of Euarthropoda. Whether these genera were true lobopodians is still contested by some. However, they are widely accepted as stem-group arthropods just basal to radiodonts.

=== Siberion and similar taxa ===
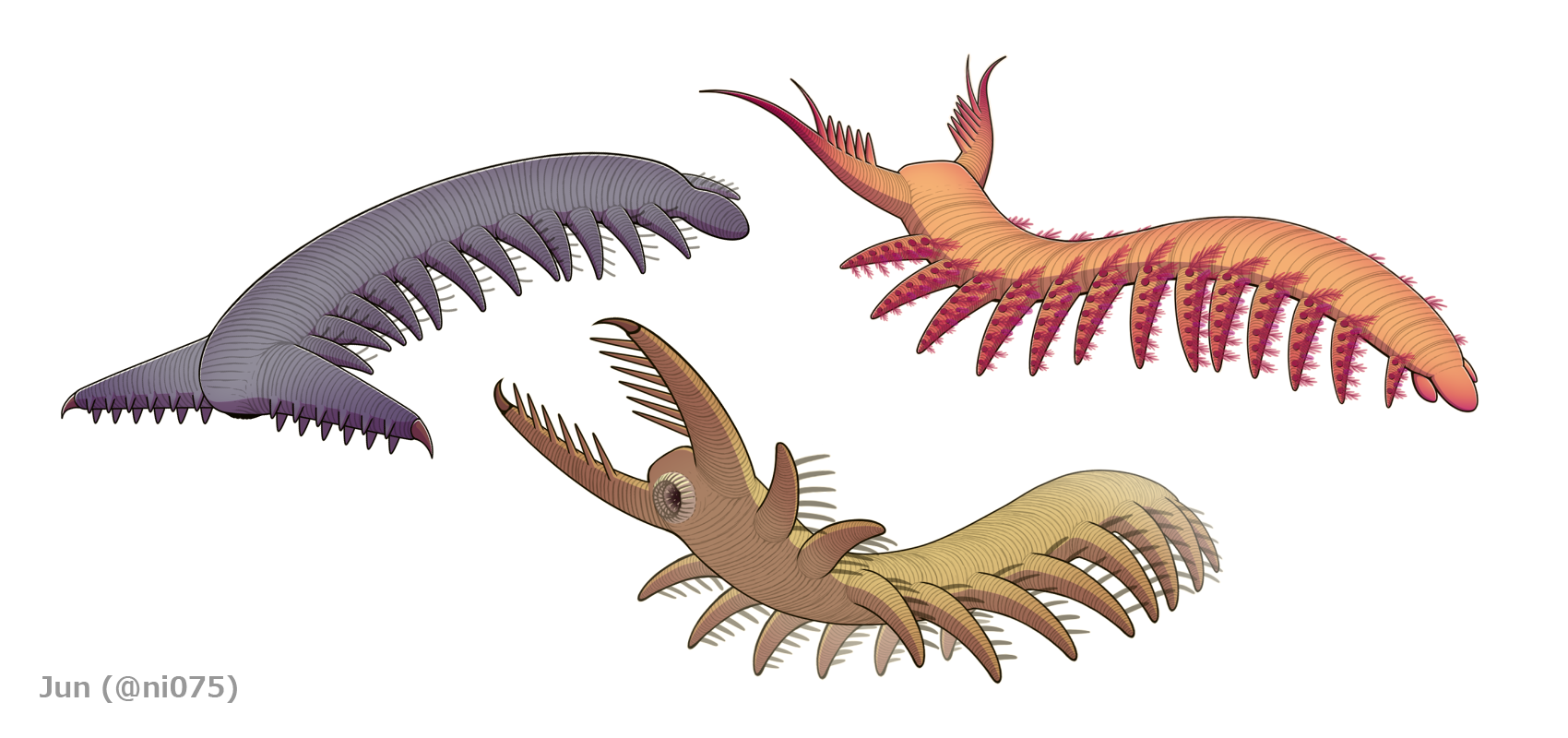
The siberiid lobopodians Siberion (upper left), Megadictyon (bottom center) and Jianshanopodia (upper right).

Siberion, Megadictyon and Jianshanopodia may be grouped as siberiids (order Siberiida), jianshanopodians or "giant lobopodians" by some literatures. They are generally large — body length ranging from 7 to 22 cm (3 to 9 in) — xenusiid lobopodians with widen trunk, stout trunk lobopods without evidence of claws, and most notably a pair of robust frontal appendages. With the possible exception of Siberion, they also have digestive glands like those of a gilled lobopodian and basal euarthropod. Their anatomy represent transitional forms between typical xenusiids and gilled lobopodians, eventually placing them under the basalmost position of arthropod stem-group.

== Paleoecology ==
Animated reconstruction of suspension-feeding lobopodian Ovatiovermis , showing how it used the anterior 6 pairs of lobopods to gather food particles, while using the posterior 3 pairs of lobopods to anchor itself.

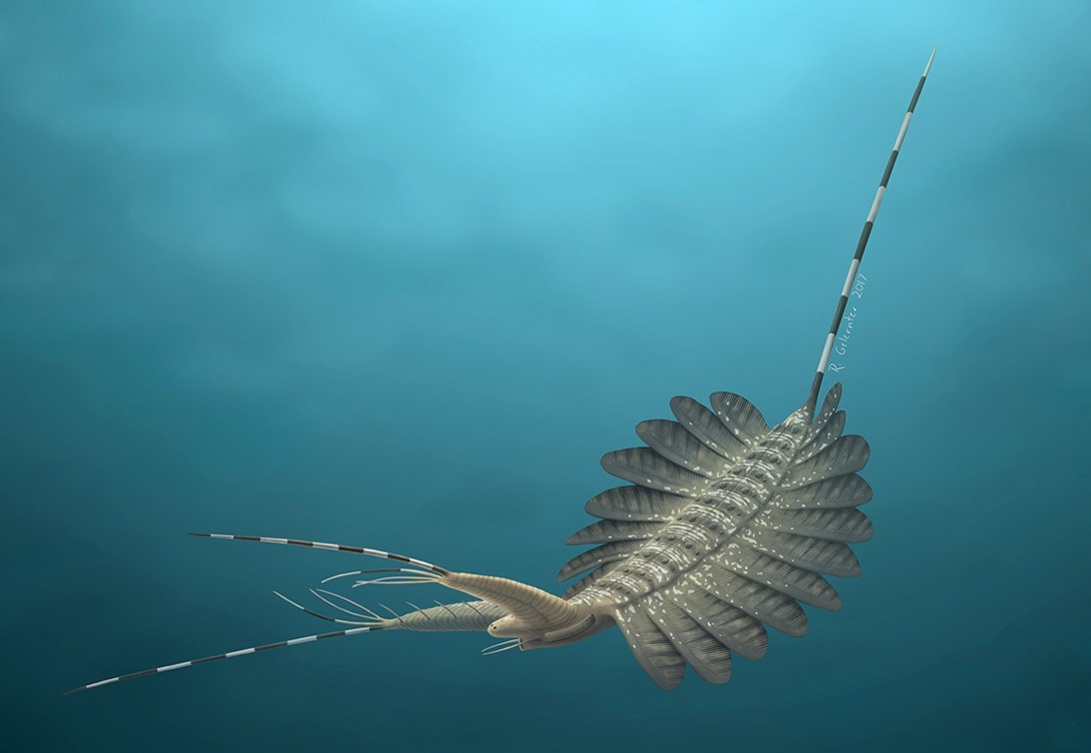
Reconstruction of the gilled lobopodian Kerygmachela as a nektonic predator.

Lobopodians possibly occupied a wide range of ecological niches. Although most of them had undifferentiated appendages and straight gut, which would suggest a simple sediment-feeding lifestyle, sophisticated digestive glands and large size of gilled lobopodians and siberiids would allow them to consume larger food items, and their robust frontal appendages may even suggest a predatory lifestyle. On the other hand, luolishaniids such as Luolishania and Ovatiovermis have elaborate feather-like lobopods that presumably formed 'baskets' for suspension or filter-feeding. Lobopods with curved terminal claws may have given some lobopodians the ability to climb on harder substrates like rocks, sponges, or animal carcasses.

Not much is known about the physiology of lobopodians. There is evidence to suggest that lobopodians moult just like other ecdysozoan taxa, but the outline and ornamentation of the harden sclerite did not vary during ontogeny. The gill-like structures on the body flaps of gilled lobopodians and ramified extensions on the lobopods of Jianshanopodia may provide respiratory function (gills). Pambdelurion may control the movement of their lobopods in a way similar to onychophorans.

== Distribution ==
During the Cambrian, lobopodians displayed a substantial degree of biodiversity. One species is known from each of the Ordovician and Silurian periods, with a few more known from the Carboniferous (Mazon Creek) — this represents the paucity of exceptional lagerstatten in post-Cambrian deposits.

== Phylogeny ==
The overall phylogenetic interpretation on lobopodians has changed dramatically since their discovery and first description. The reassignments are not only based on new fossil evidence, but also new embryological, neuroanatomical, and genomic (e.g. gene expression, phylogenomics) information observed from extant panarthropod taxa.

Based on their apparently onychophoran-like morphology (e.g. annulated cuticle, lobopodous appendage with claws), lobopodians were originally thought to be present a group of paleozoic onychophorans. This interpretation was challenged after the discovery of lobopodians with arthropod and tardigrade-like characteristics, suggesting that the similarity between lobopodians and onychophorans represents deeper panarthropod ancestral traits (plesiomorphies) instead of onychophoran-exclusive characteristics (synapomorphies). For example, the British palaeontologist Graham Budd sees the Lobopodia as representing a basal grade from which the phyla Onychophora and Arthropoda arose, with Aysheaia comparable to the ancestral plan, and with forms like Kerygmachela and Pambdelurion representing a transition that, via the dinocaridids, would lead to an arthropod body plan. Aysheaia's surface ornamentation, if homologous with palaeoscolecid sclerites, may represent a deeper link connecting it with cycloneuralian outgroups. Lobopodians are paraphyletic, and include the last common ancestor of arthropods, onychophorans and tardigrades.

Phylogeny of the Lobopodia according to Knecht et al. 2025. The phylogenetic relationships of lobopodians have been subject to much uncertainty, so this tree should be regarded as tentative.

- - Priapulida
  - †Cricocosmiidae
  - Panarthropoda
    - †Diania
    - - †Lenisambulatrix
      - - - †Paucipodia
          - - †Thanahita
            - - - †Eoconchariidae
              - - - †Xenusion
                  - †Onychodictyon
                - - †other hallucigeniids
                  - - †Hallucigenia hongmeia
                    - - †Cardiodictyon
                      - - Tardigrada
                        - † Luolishaniida
        - - †Aysheaiidae
          - Antennopoda
            - - †Antennacanthopodia
              - Onychophora (velvet worms)
            - - †Siberiidae
              - - - †Pambdelurion
                  - †Kerygmachelidae
                - - †Opabiniidae
                  - Arthropoda
                    - †Radiodonta
                    - Deuteropoda (modern arthropods)

=== Stem-group arthropods ===
Compared to other panarthropod stem-groups, suggestion on the lobopodian members of arthropod stem-group is relatively consistent — siberiid like Megadictyon and Jianshanopodia occupied the basalmost position, gilled lobopodians Pambdelurion and Kerygmachela branch next, and finally lead to a clade compose of Opabinia, Radiodonta and Euarthropoda (crown-group arthropods). Their positions within arthropod stem-group are indicated by numerous arthropod groundplans and intermediate forms (e.g. arthropod-like digestive glands, radiodont-like frontal appendages and dorso-ventral appendicular structures link to arthropod biramous appendages). Lobopodian ancestry of arthropods also reinforced by genomic studies on extant taxa — gene expression support the homology between arthropod appendages and onychophoran lobopods, suggests that modern less-segmented arthropodized appendages evolved from annulated lobopodous limbs. On the other hand, primary antennae and frontal appendages of lobopodians and dinocaridids may be homologous to the labrum/hypostome complex of euarthropods, an idea support by their protocerebral origin and developmental pattern of the labrum of extant arthropods.

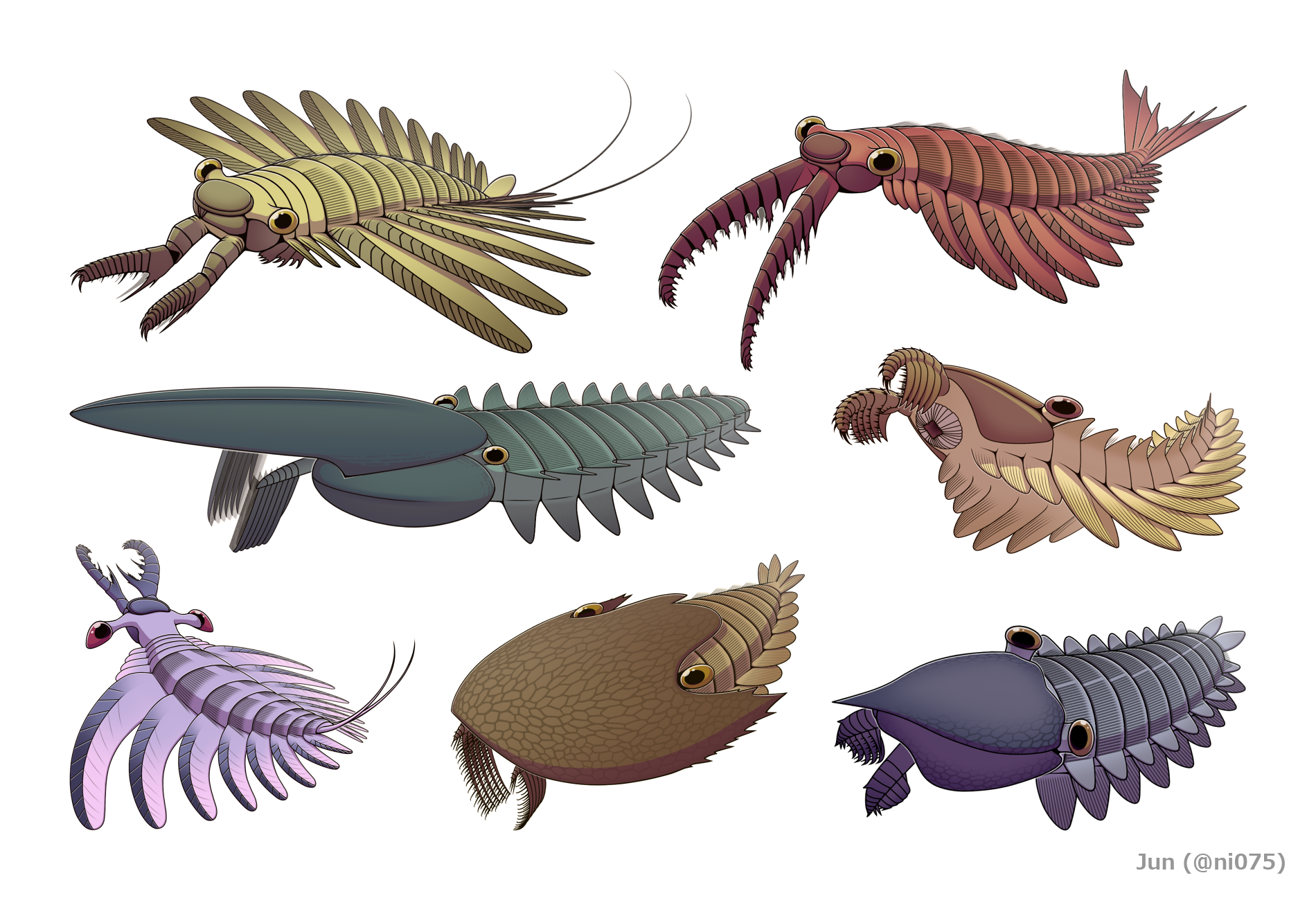
Radiodonts are stem-group arthropods with gilled lobopodian-like body flaps, arthropodized frontal appendages and stalked compound eyes.

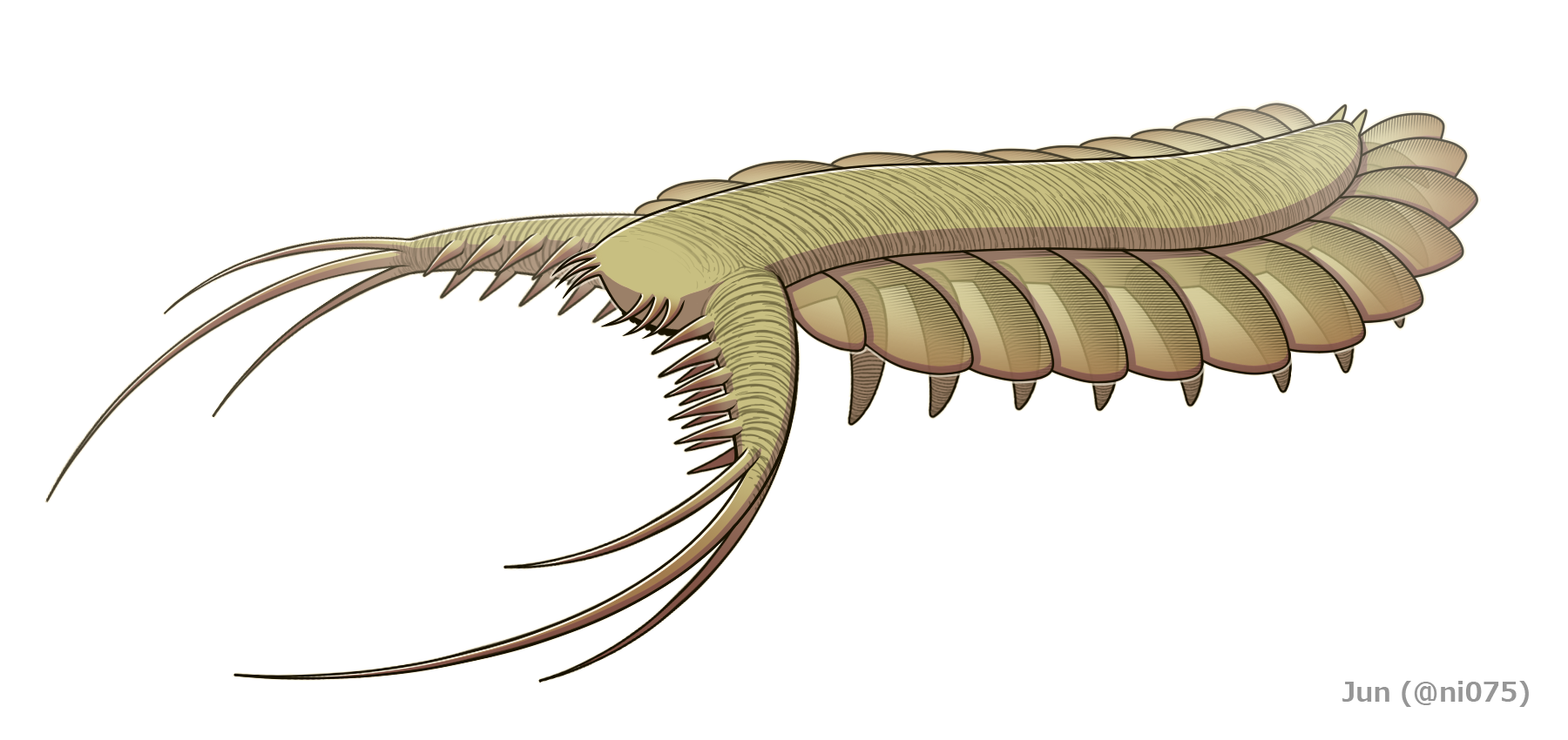
Restoration of Pambdelurion a "gilled lobopodian" related to arthropods, which has both pairs of lobopods and lateral flaps.

Diania, a genus of armoured lobopodian with stout and spiny legs, were originally thought to be associated within the arthropod stem-group based on its apparently arthropod-like (arthropodized) trunk appendages. However, this interpretation is questionable as the data provided by the original description are not consistent with the suspected phylogenic relationships. Further re-examination even revealed that the suspected arthropodization on the legs of Diania was a misinterpretation — although the spine may have hardened, the remaining cuticle of Diania's legs were soft (not harden nor scleritzed), lacking any evidence of pivot joint and arthrodial membrane, suggest the legs are lobopods with only widely spaced annulations. Thus, the re-examination eventually reject the evidence of arthropodization (sclerotization, segmentation and articulation) on the appendages as well as the fundamental relationship between Diania and arthropods.

=== Stem-group onychophorans ===
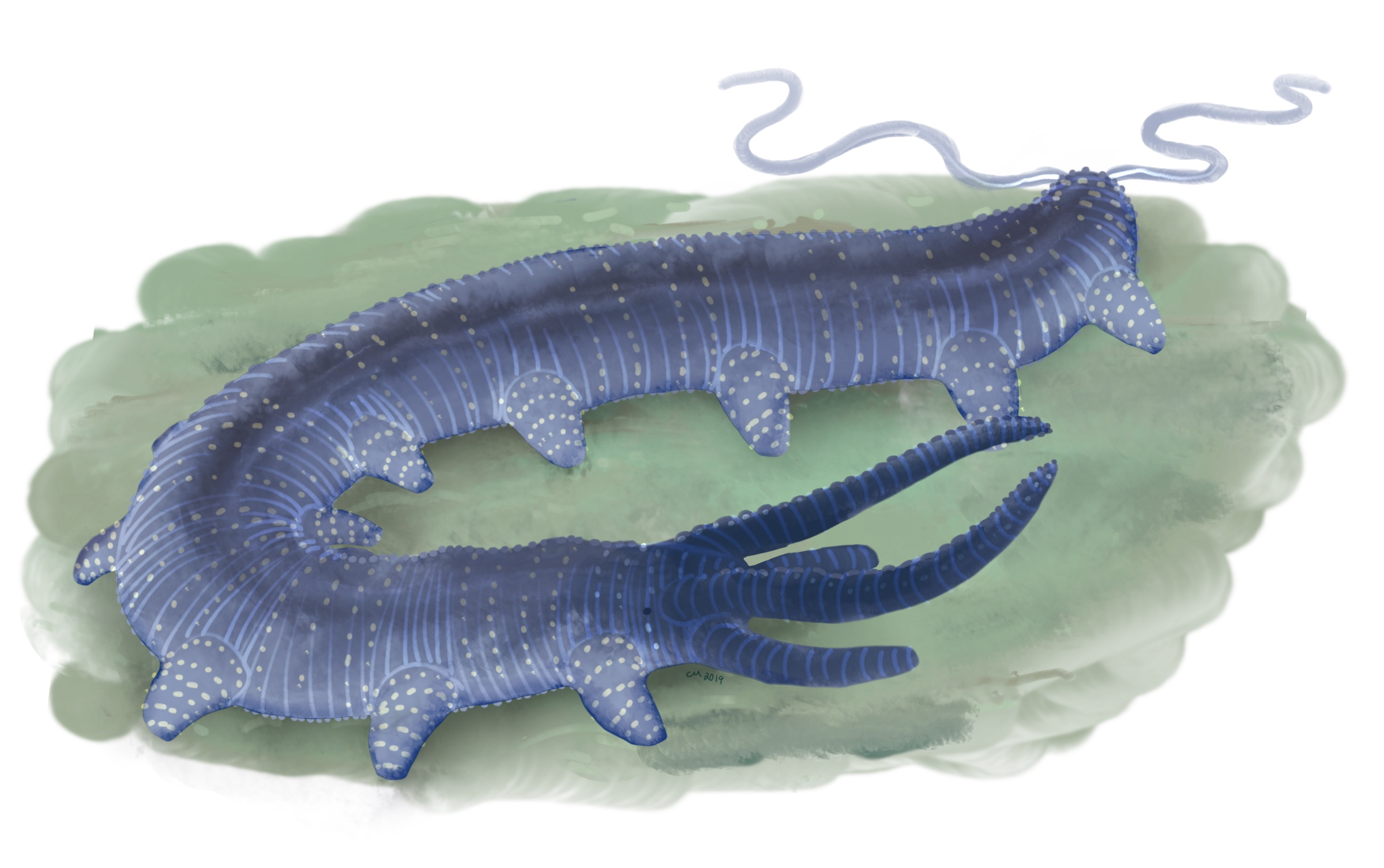
Antennacanthopodia gracilis, a lobopodian suggested to be a stem-group onychophoran.

While Antennacanthopodia is widely accepted as a stem-group onychophoran, the position of other genera that were previously thought to be onychophoran-related is controversial — in further studies, most of them were either suggested to be stem-group onychophorans or basal panarthropods, with a few species (Aysheaia or Onychodictyon ferox) occasionally suggested to be stem-group tardigrades. A study in 2014 suggested that Hallucigenia are stem-group onychophorans based on their claws, which have overlapped internal structures resembling those of an extant onychophoran. This interpretation was questioned by later studies, as the structures may be a panarthropod plesiomorphy. Unless Helenodora is also counted, more recent studies have found Antennacanthopodia to be the only stem-group onychophoran.

=== Stem-group tardigrades ===
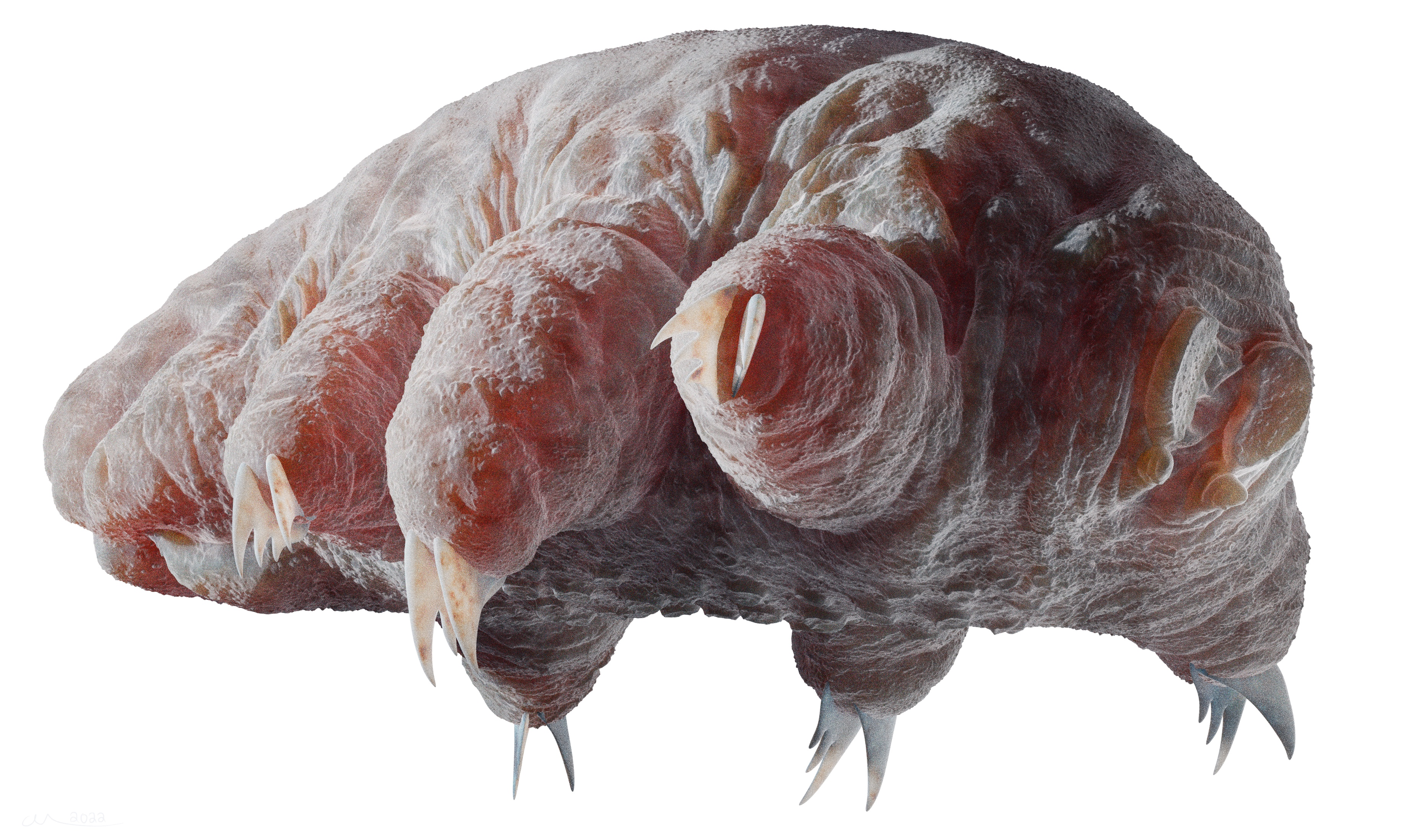
Artistic reconstruction of the "Orsten" tardigrade, a parasitic stem-lineage tardigrade, known from fossils recovered from the Cambrian Kuonamka Formation of Siberia.

Lobopodian taxa of the tardigrade stem-group is unclear. Aysheaia or Onychodictyon ferox had been suggest to be a possible member, based on the high claw number (in Aysheaia) and/or terminal lobopods with anterior-facing claws (in both taxa). Although not widely accepted, there are even suggestions that Tardigrada itself representing the basalmost panarthropod or branch between the arthropod stem-group. However, papers from 2023 and 2025 found luolishaniids to be the closest relatives of tardigrades using various morphological characteristics.

=== Stem-group panarthropods ===
It is unclear which lobopodians represent members of the panarthropod stem-group, and which were branched just before the last common ancestor of extant panarthropod phyla. Aysheaia may have occupied this position based on its apparently basic morphology; while other studies rather suggest luolishaniid and hallucigenid, two lobopodian taxa which had been resolved as members of stem-group onychophorans as well.

== Described genera ==
As of 2018, over 20 lobopodian genera have been described. The fossil materials being described as lobopodians Mureropodia apae and Aysheaia prolata are considered to be disarticulated frontal appendages of the radiodonts Caryosyntrips and Stanleycaris, respectively. Miraluolishania was suggested to be synonym of Luolishania by some studies. The enigmatic Facivermis was later revealed to be a highly specialized genus of luolishaniid lobopodians. Palaeocampa, formerly thought to be a fireworm, was also found as a lobopodian.

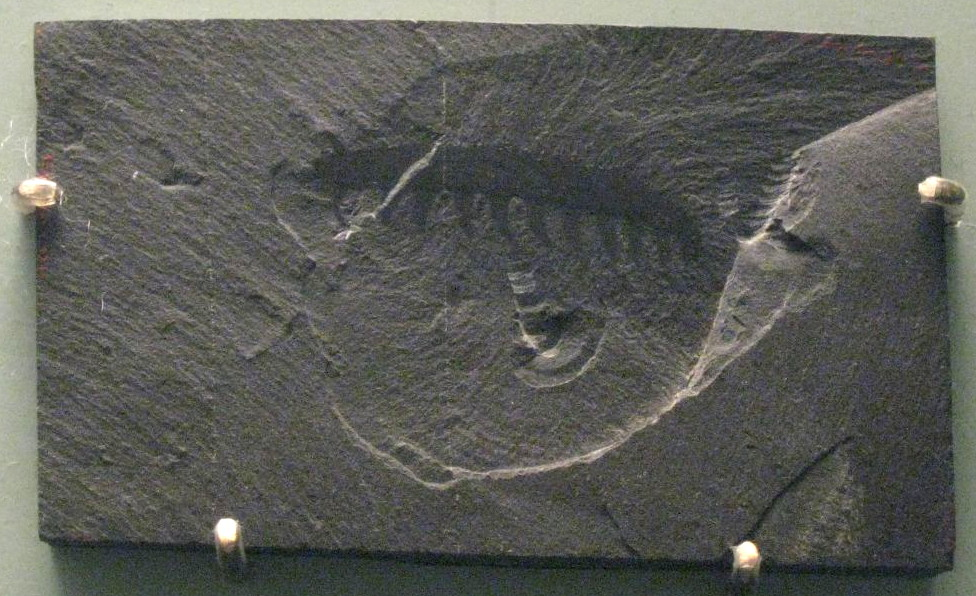
Fossil of Aysheaia pedunculata.

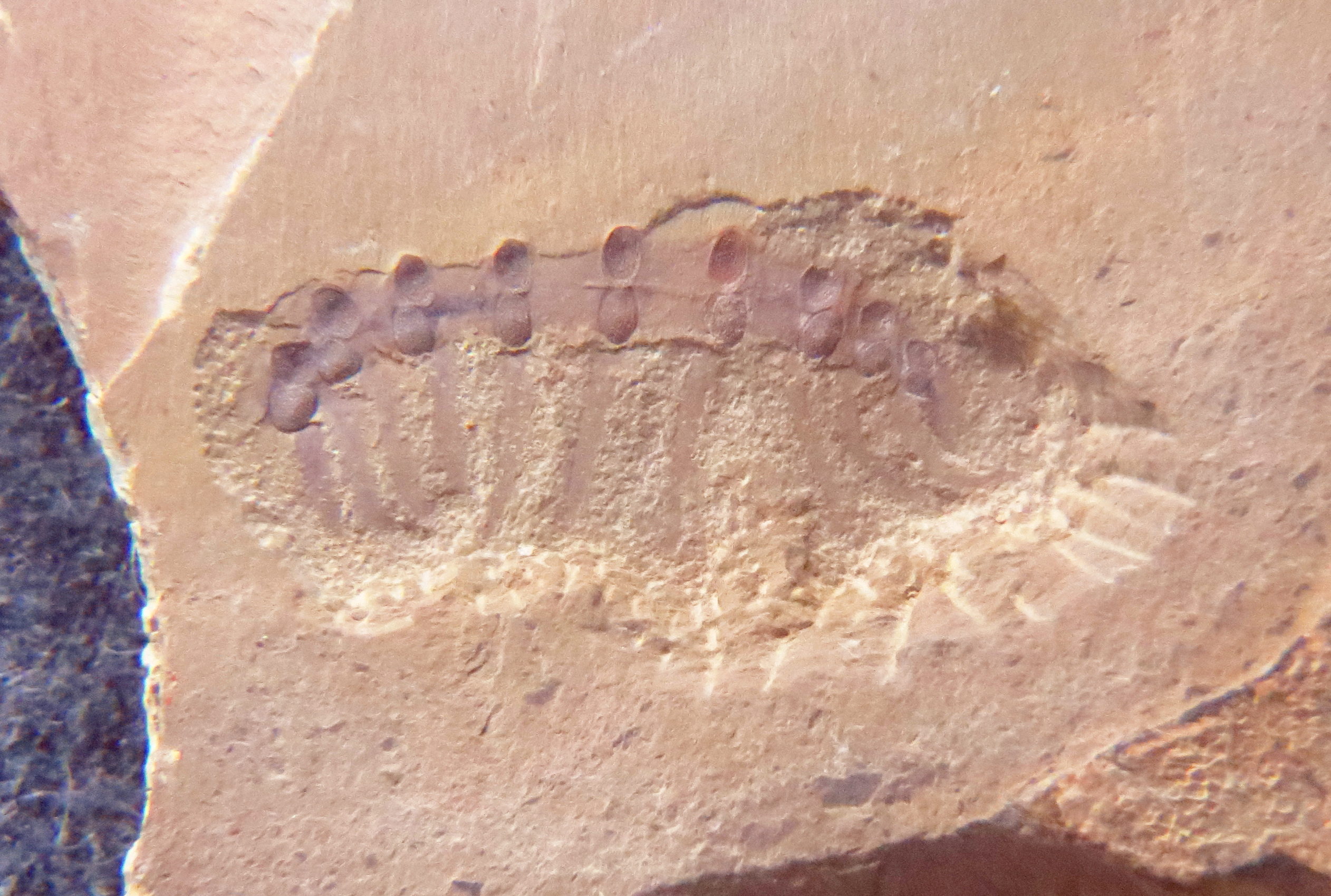
Fossil of Microdictyon sinicum.

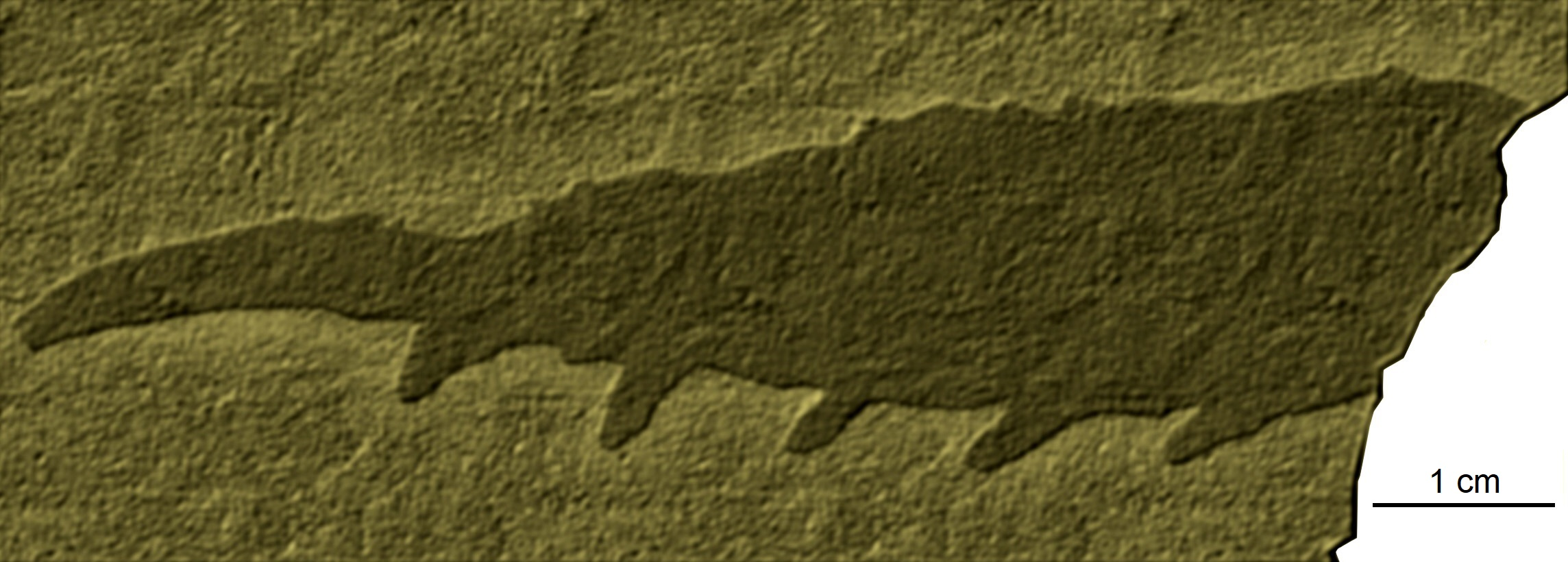
Fossil of "Mureropodia apae", which may be in fact frontal appendage of Caryosyntrips cf. camurus.

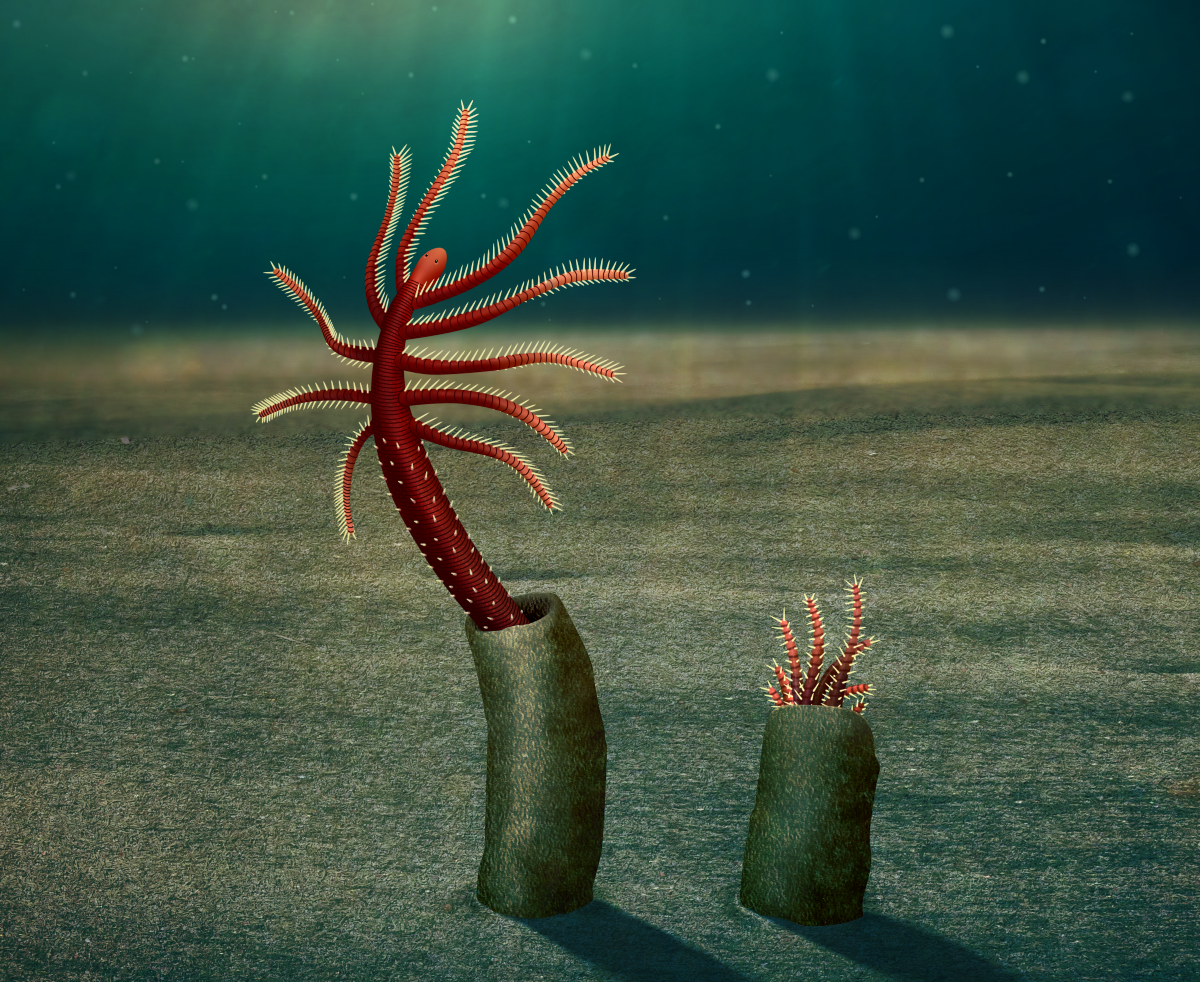
Reconstruction of Facivermis, an unusual lobopodian with limbless posterior region that lived like a tube worm

Described species of fossil Lobopodians
Genus	Species	Family	Notes	Age	Location	Image
Paucipodia	P. inermis Chen, Zhou & Ramsköld, 1995	Paucipodiidae	An unarmoured lobopodian from the Chengjiang Biota. Probably a scavenger, it is equipped with paired claws at the end of each lobopod. Some are preserved alongside symbiotic epibionts.	Cambrian Stage 3	China	
Lenisambulatrix	L. humboldti Ou & Mayer, 2018	(Unassigned)	An unarmoured lobopodian with highly elongate, clawless lobopod limbs.	Cambrian Stage 3	China	
Diania	D. cactiformis Liu et al., 2011	(Unassigned)	A long-legged lobopodian covered entirely with weakly sclerotized spines and papillae.	Cambrian Stage 3	China	
Cardiodictyon	C. catenulum Hou, Ramsköld & Bergström, 1991	Cardiodictyidae	Lobopodian with extremely elongate body, with roughly 25 pairs of lobopod limbs, each associated with a saddle-shaped trunk sclerite.	Cambrian Stage 3	China	
Xenusion	X. auerswaldae Pompeckj, 1927	Xenusiidae	Originally discovered around the time of the first World War, this lobopodian is known from glacial erratics from the early Cambrian.	Cambrian Stage 2	Germany	
Onychodictyon	O. ferox Hou, Ramsköld, & Bergström, 1991; O. spiniferum? Demidenko, 2006	Onychodictyidae	The body of this lobopodian was covered in numerous elongate papillae, each trunk segment bearing a pair of netted sclerites ending in a pointed tip. O. spiniferum (=Onychomicrodictyon spiniferum) is known from Greenland, it is considered by some to be a junior synonym.	Cambrian Stage 3	China Russia Greenland	
Orstenotubulus	O. evamuellerae Maas et al., 2007	(Unassigned)	Known from microscopic, three-dimensionally preserved Orsten-type fossils, which show the detailed ornament of the cuticle, and retractable spines that protrude from the inner surface of the limbs.	Furongian	Sweden	
Microdictyon	M. effusum Bengston, Matthew, & Missarzhevsky, 1981; M. rhomboidale Bengston, Matthew, & Missarzhevsky, 1986; M. robisoni Bengston, Matthew, & Missarzhevsky, 1986; M. chinense Hao & Shu, 1987; M. sphaeroides Hinz, 1987; M. sinicum Chen, Hou, & Lu, 1989; M. depressum Bengston et al., 1990; M. fuchengense Li & Zhu, 2001; M. jinshaense Zhang & Aldridge, 2007; M. montezumaensis Wotte & Sundberg, 2017; M. cuneum Wotte & Sundberg, 2017	Eoconchariidae	Globally distributed lobopodian, with most species known only from isolated sclerite plates, which are circular and net-like. Complete, soft-bodied fossils are found in the Chengjiang Biota, and the Kaili Biota.	Cambrian Stage 3 to Middle Cambrian	China Russia UK Sweden Canada USA Australia Greenland Mongolia Turkey Mexico Uzbekistan Kazakhstan	
Quadratapora	Q. zhenbaensis Hao & Shu, 1987; Q. tenuiporatum Bengtson, Matthews & Missarzhevsky, 1986	Eoconchariidae	Eoconchariid lobopodian similar to Microdictyon. Known only from isolated plates.	Cambrian Stage 3	China Russia	
Fusuchoncharium	F. typicum Hao & Shu, 1987	Eoconchariidae	Eoconchariid lobopodian similar to Microdictyon. Known only from isolated plates.	Cambrian Stage 3	China	
Hallucigenia	H. sparsa Walcott, 1911; H. fortis Hou & Bergström, 1995; H. hongmeia Steiner et al., 2012	Hallucigeniidae	One of the most famous fossil lobopodians, originally described from the Burgess Shale. Two other species have been described, but their placement within the genus remains uncertain.	Cambrian Stage 3 to Wuliuan	Canada China	
Rhombocorniculum	R. cancellatum Walliser, 1958; R. insolatum Missarzhevsky in Missarzhevsky & Mambetov, 1981	Hallucigeniidae (Strictocorniculacea)	Only recently recognized as a lobopodian, this genus is known exclusively from isolated sclerites found around the world. The spines are flattened and twisting.	Cambrian Stage 3	Canada UK China Mongolia Russia Kazakhstan Spain	
Strictocorniculum	S. vanallerum Landing, 1995	Hallucigeniidae (Strictocorniculacea)	Recognized as a lobopodian sclerite in 2025, this species is known from deep-water Cambrian deposits in Nova Scotia, and is allied with Rhombocorniculum by its tightly organized rhomboidal scales.	Cambrian Stage 3 to Cambrian Stage 4	CanadaUSA	
Carbotubulus	C. waloszeki Haug et al., 2012	Hallucigeniidae	The first marine lobopodian known from the Carboniferous, with three sets of differentiated legs, allying it with the hallucigeniids.	Moscovian	USA	
Thanahita	T. distos Siveter et al., 2018	Hallucigeniidae?	The only currently named Silurian lobopodian. Trunk was covered with numerous large tufted papillae, which follow a complex distribution.	Wenlockian	UK	
Tritonychus	T. phanerosarkus Zhang & Smith, 2016	Stem-group Onychophora?	A three-dimensionally preserved Orsten-type fossil from the Chengjiang Biota, composed of a partial trunk segment with long 3-clawed lobopods, has not been analyzed since 2016 so may not be a stem-onychophoran.	Cambrian Stage 3	China	
Luolishania	L. longicruris Hou & Chen, 1989	Luolishaniida	Considered synonymous with Miraluolishania haikouensis.	Cambrian Stage 3	China	
Ovatiovermis	O. cribratus Caron & Aria, 2017	Luolishaniida	An unarmoured luolishaniid lobopodian from the Burgess Shale, with anchoring lobopods bearing large claws at its posterior, and filter-feeding lobopods anteriorly.	Wuliuan–Drumian	Canada	
Facivermis	F. yunnanicus Hou & Chen, 1989	Luolishaniida	A highly derived lobopodian which lacks any walking-lobopodians, bearing only 5 pairs of filter-feeding appendages anteriorly, with a long trunk terminating in a bulbous anchoring segment. Lived in constructed tubes buried in sediment, opening up to the water column.	Cambrian Stage 3	China	
Entothyreos	E. synnaustrus Aria & Caron, 2024	Luolishaniida (Collinsovermidae)	A collinsovermid lobopodian with internal sclerite plates which acted similarly to arthropod tergites or vertebrae, reinforcing the body and allowing body erection for filter feeding.	Wuliuan–Drumian	Canada	
Collinsovermis	C. monstruosum Caron & Aria, 2020	Luolishaniida (Collinsovermidae)	Known since 1983, this stout, highly armoured lobopodian (nicknamed "the Collins monster" after Desmond Collins, later lending this name to any collinsovermid lobopodian), did not receive a description until 2020.	Wuliuan–Drumian	Canada	
Collinsium	C. ciliosum Yang et al., 2015	Luolishaniida (Collinsovermidae)	Collinsovermid lobopodian with an elongate body bearing 15 pairs of lobopod limbs and sclerite spine sets.	Cambrian Stage 3	China	
Acinocricus	A. stichus Conway-Morris & Robison, 1988	Luolishaniida (Collinsovermidae)	Highly armoured collinsovermid lobopodian with hundreds of spines borne on whorls, set between the limbs rather than above them.	Wuliuan	USA	
Aysheaia	A. pedunculata Walcott, 1911	Aysheaiidae	Originally described as an annelid, entomologists quickly pointed out similarities between this Burgess Shale fossil and living velvet worms.	Wuliuan–Drumian	Canada	
Hadranax	H. augustus Budd & Peel, 1998	Aysheaiidae	Known from only 3 specimens, this lobopodian was large, short-legged, and possessed incredibly elongate frontal appendages. It is found in the deep-sea deposits of Sirius Passet.	Wuliuan–Drumian	Greenland	
Palaeocampa	P. anthrax Meek & Worthen, 1865	Aysheaiidae	Only known freshwater lobopodian. Originally described as a caterpillar, and later a polychaete, it was redescribed in 2025 as a lobopodian with venomous spines.	Moscovian to Stephanian	USA France	
Antennacanthopodia	A. gracilis Ou et al., 2011	Stem-group Onychophora	A rare lobopodian from the Chengjiang Biota, notable for its resemblance to modern onychophorans. As it was a marine species, the second pair of head appendages could not have functioned like the slime papillae of velvet worms.	Cambrian Stage 3	China	
Helenodora	H. inopinata Thompson & Jones, 1980	Onychophora or stem-group Onychophora?	A putative velvet worm from Mazon Creek, whether or not it lived on land or in the ocean is debated. The morphology of this animal (whether it had claws, jaws, and slime papillae) is also in question.	Moscovian	USA	
Siberion	S. lenaicus Dzik, 2011	Siberiidae	Known from only two fossils, the fossil site this species come from has since been destroyed.	Early Cambrian	Russia	
Megadictyon	M. haikouensis Luo & Hu, 1999	Siberiidae	A siberiid lobopodian with a body up to 20 centimetres long, which remains poorly described.	Cambrian Stage 3	China	
Jianshanopodia	J. decora Liu et al., 2006	Siberiidae	A siberiid lobopodian with a body up to 30 centimetres long. The trunk lobopods are lined with tree-like branching papillae on their posterior edge, probably a respiratory feature.	Cambrian Stage 3	China	
Kerygmachela	K. kierkegaardi Budd, 1993	Kerygmachelidae	A pelagic lobopodian from the Sirius Passet. It had a trunk lined with sets of small, sclerotized nodes, to which muscles attached.	Cambrian Stage 3	Greenland	
Mobulavermis	M. adustus McCall, 2023	Kerygmachelidae	A large pelagic kerygmachelid lobopodian with a high number of body flap pairs, known from two specimens from the Pioche Shale.	Cambrian Stage 4	USA	
Utahnax	U. vannieri Lerosey-Aubril & Ortega-Hernández, 2022	Kerygmachelidae	A large pelagic lobopodian, probably related to Kerygmachela. Its lobopodous appendages are flattened as to form flaps.	Drumian	USA	
Pambdelurion	P. whittingtoni Budd, 1997	(Unassigned)	A large, 50 centimetre long lobopodian from Sirius Passet. Possessing both legs and flaps (the latter of which apparently lack musculature), this was the apex predator of the ecosystem.	Cambrian Stage 3	Greenland	
Omnidens	O. amplus Hou et al.., 2006	(Unassigned)	The largest known Cambrian animal, reaching an estimated ~1.7 metres in length, based on the closely related Pambdelurion. Known from large sclerotized jaws and the terminal, sclerotized talons of the frontal appendages.	Cambrian Stage 3	China	
Opabinia	O. regalis Walcott, 1912	Opabiniidae	A "weird wonder" of the Cambrian with frontal appendages adapted into an elongate proboscis, and 5 eyes on the head.	Wuliuan–Drumian	Canada	
Utaurora	U. comosa Pates et al., 2022	Opabiniidae	The first new opabiniid described since 1912, this species is known from a single specimen from the Wheeler Shale of Utah.	Drumian	USA	
Mieridduryn	M. bonniae Pates et al, 2022	Opabiniidae	A probably opabiniid from the Ordovician of Wales, found at the Castle Bank Lagerstätte. This species apparently lacks eyes, with its head covered instead by a small cephalic sclerite, but does possess both flaps and lobopods, and a frontal proboscis.	Middle Ordovician	United Kingdom	
Youti?	Y. yuanshi Smith et al., 2024	(Unassigned)	An embryonic panarthropod from the Yu'anshan Formation, preserved three-dimensionally in Orsten-style, this fossil provides a remarkable view into the internal anatomy of early panarthropods.	Cambrian Stage 3	China	
