= Tritonychus =

Tritonychus Temporal range: Cambrian

Scientific classification
- Kingdom: Animalia
- Stem group: Onychophora
- Genus: †Tritonychus
- Species: †T. phanerosarkus

Binomial name
- †Tritonychus phanerosarkus Zhang & Smith 2016

Extinct species of Cambrian organism

Tritonychus phanerosarkus is a Cambrian lobopodian, exceptionally preserved in the Orsten fashion by phosphate deposition, additionally preserving muscle fibers. Phylogenetic analysis suggests that it was a close relative of the Onychophora, possibly even a member of the main lineage. The muscle fibers preserved in its legs establish peripheral musculature as a characteristic of all panarthropods, but are arranged in an unusual pattern (detailed below).

== Discovery and naming ==
Tritonychus was discovered in the Xiaotan section, Yongshan, Yunnan Province in the Yu'anshan Formation. Its name loosely translates to "Three-clawed animal with well displayed flesh".

== Description ==
=== External features ===
The fossil found was small, with only one segment of the animal found. This was 1 millimeter long, and folded at the mid-point, with one pair of lobopods preserved and much of the dorsal body surface missing. This missing surface was actually an advantage to the scientists studying it as it revealed the muscle fibers within the body. The skin has circumferential wrinkles spaced at 10 μm apart, which divide and merge irregularly. These wrinkles bear small papillae which are thought to correspond to the dermal papillae of other extinct Onchyophora. Along the two lobopods, the wrinkles become smaller and eventually give way to raised polygonal boundaries, which could mark cell borders in the skin tissue. The papillae continue along the lobopods, with bases of around 5μm across and about 7μm high.

=== Appendages ===
The fossil found had two lobopods preserved, each around 800μm long and with a uniform diameter of 80μm, not tapering. At the end of each lobopod there are three 30μm claws preserved, with an angle of 45° between each one. The raised centers of the impressions of these claws denote a hollow claw slightly longer than the 25μm impressions, hence the figure of 30μm. The lobopods had a circular cross-section, flattened in places, and are thought to be at the posterior end of the specimen with the claws pointing towards the anterior, as in other lobopodians.

=== Musculature ===
The muscles preserved were those inside the body cavity of the specimen, mostly making up the body wall. There were three layers of fibrous muscular tissue, each around 10μm thick. The outermost layer of muscle consisted of 5-10μm thick fibers, which part to leave a 60μm gap between the lobopods, thought to be a gonopore and part again near the outer edge of each lobopod, possibly for leg elevator muscle insertion. Inside this, there was a layer of much thinner, interwoven oblique fibers. The innermost layer of fibers is oriented perpendicular to the body axis, presumably the remains of a more extensive layer of circular muscles.

=== Preservation ===
The preservation of the animal is unusual in several respects. Firstly, in Orsten-type microfossils muscle preservation is very rare and it is much more common that other tissue is preserved in phosphate in this way. Secondly, when onchyophorans are rotted in seawater or saline solution, body wall muscles are the first parts to decay, well before organs such as gonads or the gut and before harder parts such as the hollow claws present in this species, of which only the inner bases remain.

== Evolutionary importance ==
Previously, due to the rarity both of onchyophoran fossils and preserved musculature, it was uncertain whether peripheral muscle was a characteristic of all panarthropods or just of primitive arthropods and tardigrades (modern members of this clade have evolved skeletal muscle from the peripheral muscle in their ancestors). Tritonychus phanerosarkus shows that peripheral muscle was also a feature of onchyophorans, and thus of panarthropods as a whole.

However, the evolution of three-layered muscle from the two-layered muscle of more ancestral fossils is not straightforward. In living onchyophorans, the outermost layer of muscle is circular, the middle interwoven oblique and the innermost longitudinal, reversing the order of those in Tritonychus. This leaves the homology of muscle layers unclear, to say the least.

Tritonychus is clearly given a place within an 'onchyophoran-like' clade, however, due to skin similarities to other 'onchyophoran-like' lobopodians and modern onchyophorans. These include bifurcating circumferential wrinkles, papillae mounted on solid bases, and (in parts) hexagonal patterning. This extends the record of these features into the lower Cambrian, along with the multiple layers of peripheral muscle and the possible gonopore.
