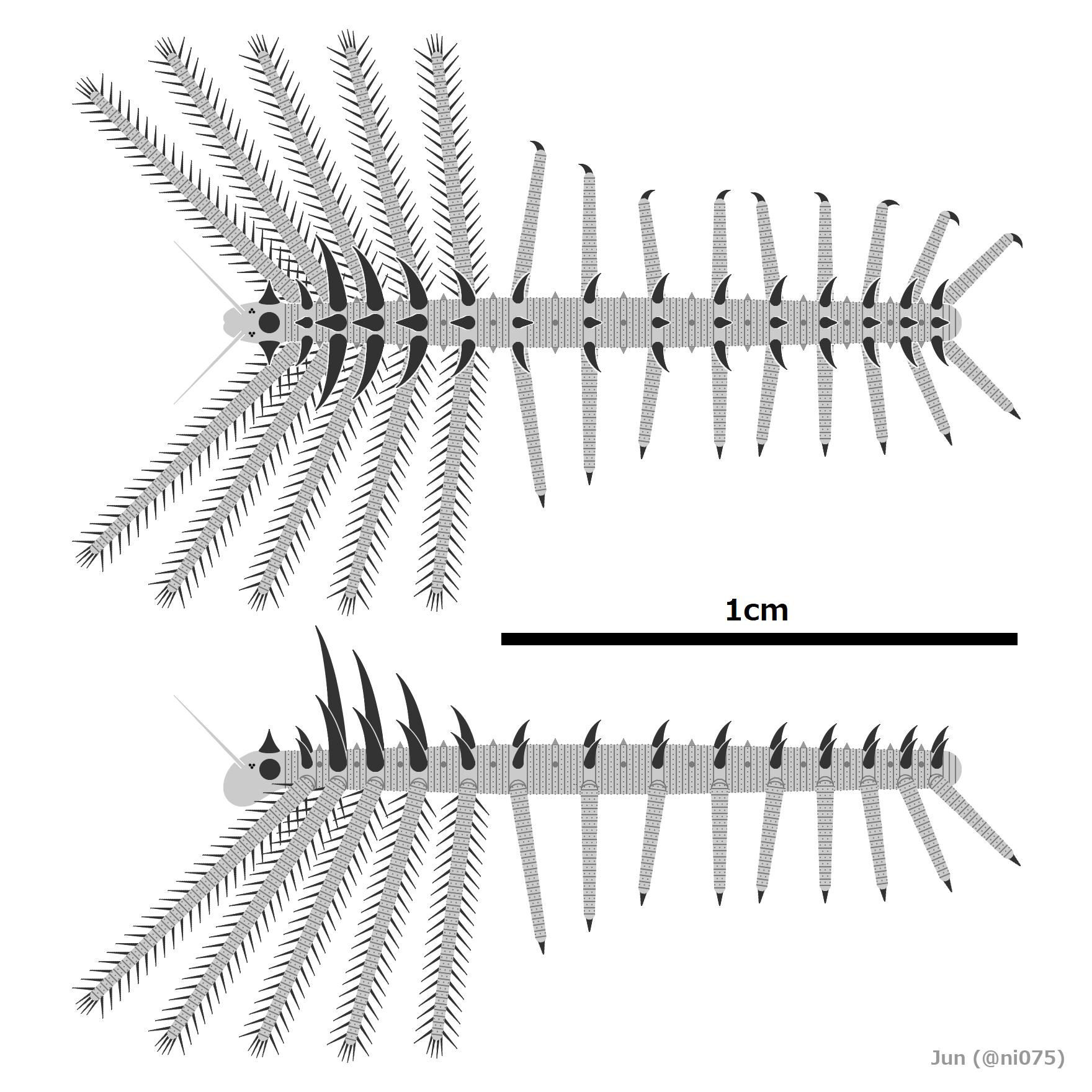
- Diagrammatic reconstruction of Miraluolishania haikouensis

Scientific classification
- Kingdom: Animalia
- Clade: Panarthropoda
- Phylum: †Lobopodia
- Family: †Luolishaniidae
- Genus: †Miraluolishania; Liu & Shu, 2004

= Miraluolishania =

Miraluolishania Temporal range: Early Cambrian

Extinct genus of lobopodians

Miraluolishania is an extinct lobopodian known from Chengjiang County in China. It is remarkable for the possession of lensed pit-eyes. The only species, Miraluolishania haikouensis, was described from the Maotianshan Shales at Haikou by Jianni Liu and Degan Shu in 2004. In 2009, a team of palaeontologists at the Yunnan University, led by Xiaoya Ma reported the discovery of 42 other specimens from Haikou. With the help of Swiss palaeontologist Jan Bergström, Ma and Hou came to the conclusion that all the specimens were the same species (junior synonym) as Luolishania; another lobopod discovered from the Chengjian in 1989. Chengjian is 40 kms from Haikou and the fossil fauna are different. A reassessment by Liu and Shu's team at the Northwest University in 2008 established that Luolishania and Miraluolishania are distinct animals.
