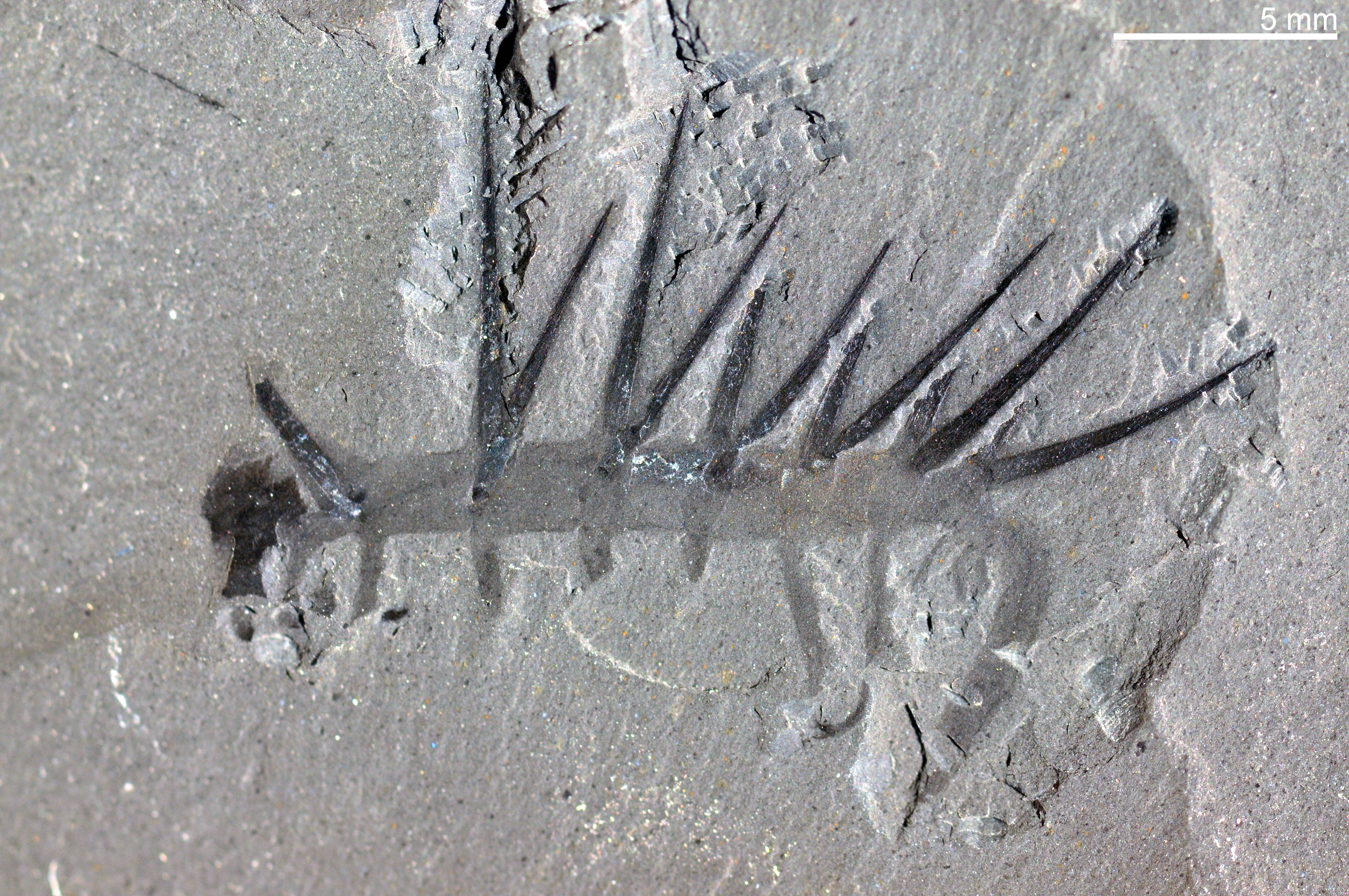
- Fossil of Hallucigenia from the Burgess Shale

Scientific classification
- Domain: Eukaryota
- Kingdom: Animalia
- (unranked): Panarthropoda
- Phylum: †"Lobopodia"
- Order: †Scleronychophora; Huo and Bergström 1995

= Scleronychophora =

Scleronychophora Temporal range: Cambrian

Extinct order of Lobopodia

The Scleronychophora or armoured lobopods are a group of lobopodians (such as the hallucigeniids and microdictyon) that bear a robust dorsal armature of paired plates.
