= Carbotubulus =

Carbotubulus Temporal range: Carboniferous, Middle Pennsylvanian (Moscovian)

Scientific classification
- Kingdom: Animalia
- Clade: Panarthropoda
- Phylum: †Lobopodia
- Clade: †Hallucishaniids
- Family: †Hallucigeniidae
- Genus: †Carbotubulus; Haug et al., 2012
- Species: †C. waloszeki

Binomial name
- †Carbotubulus waloszeki Haug et al., 2012

Extinct genus of lobopodian worm

Carbotubulus is a genus of aquatic lobopodian known from the Carboniferous Carbondale Formation of the Mazon Creek area from the state of Illinois, in the United States. A monotypic genus, it contains one species: Carbotubulus waloszeki, and is known from a single fossil. Overall, the animal had a very tubular body. Its head, trunk, and 10 pairs of limbs (9 of them being legs) all resembled long thin tubes. Carbotubulus is most notable for being a Lazarus taxon, demonstrating that the lobopodian family Hallucigeniidae persisted into the Late Carboniferous.

== Discovery and naming ==
Carbotubulus is known from only a single fossil, the holotype ROM 47514, and is composed of two halves, a part and counterpart. The fossil was found in the Francis Creek Shale of Illinois's Carbondale Formation. More specifically, it was recovered from Pit 11 of the Mazon Creek fossil beds. Carbotubulus was discovered and described by Joachim T. Haug, Georg Mayer, Carolin Haug, and Derek E.G. Briggs in 2012. Currently, the animal is being held in the Invertebrate Palaeontology Collection at the Royal Ontario Museum of Toronto, Canada.

Carbotubulus's genus name is derived from two words. The first, "carbo", is Latin and references it living in the Carboniferous period. The second, "tubulus", is also Latin and means "small pipe", a reference to the animal's narrow pipe-like legs. The species name "waloszeki" honors Dieter Waloszek for his work on arthropod evolution.

== Description ==
The Carbotubulus holotype was preserved in 3D, with the animal being nearly 7 times longer than wide (35 mm in length vs 4.8 mm in width). In general, Carbotubulus had a smooth body. It lacked any annulations (rings of skin) or dermal papillae other than a few longitudinal wrinkles.

At the front of its body, Carbotubulus had a long cylindrical head that made up 1/3rd of the animal's total length. While the front-most part was chipped off, most of the head was encased in the fossil concretion. Near the beginning of the head were two pairs of dark circular spots. The first were positioned more towards the sides of the head while the second were located behind it, were slightly fainter, and positioned higher up, being closer to the animal's midline. The paper never suggested what these might be, including if they were eyes. However, the authors dismissed them being artifacts due to their symmetrical arrangement. Behind the dots, Carbotubulus had a small pair of lobopods situated on the bottom of the head towards the sides, being separated from and significantly tinier than the animal's legs. In Knecht et al's 2025 redescription of Palaeocampa, these were considered tentacular lobopods, much like those on the head region of Hallucigenia and typical of Hallucigeniidae.

On its trunk section, Carbotubulus had 9 pairs of long, narrow, tube-like lobopods that would have functioned as legs. The legs were more than twice as long as the body's diameter and were more than 5 times longer than wide. As with the head, not all of these were fully incorporated into the fossil concretion, the ends of pairs 8 and 10 being clipped off. The legs were preserved in different lengths and sizes, with the largest (pair 8) being 11 mm long and 2 mm in diameter. The diameter of pairs 7 and 9 are somewhat wider, though the authors considered this an artifact of preservation from a sloped break when the fossil was cut open. At the end of the animal, the trunk merges with the last pair of limbs rather than continuing further. Knecht et al wondered if Carbotubulus had spines on its back in life, but admitted this had yet to be thoroughly investigated.

== Classification ==
When Carbotubulus was first described, where it sit on the tree of life was not analyzed, and it was loosely assigned to the group Panarthropoda (or in the original description, Arthropoda sensu lato) A study on Hallucigenia's mouth in 2015 and discovery of the Cambrian lobopod Ovatiovermis cribratus from the Burgess Shale in 2017 led to a reanalysis of lobopodian classification, and Carbotubulus was confidently labeled a panarthropod, specifically assigned the family Hallucigeniidae The 2015 study recovered it as a sister group to Hallucigenia sparsa, while the 2017 study found it to be the basalmost definite Hallucigeniid.

This placement was challenged after the discovery of the another post-Cambrian (Silurian) long-legged lobopodian, Thanahita distos, from the Herefordshire Lagerstätte at the England–Wales border in UK in 2018. The new interpretation suggested that Carbotubulus may lie outside the hallucigeniid family. A later study from 2024 disagreed with this, placing Carbotubulus along with Thanahita and Microdictyon back in Hallucigeniidae.

A year later, another paper describing Palaeocampa anthrax found Carbotubulus to be in a polytomy with a variety of traditional Hallucigeniids (though Cardiodictyon and Hallucigenia hongmeia were outside the group). A phylogeny of this can be found below.

- Panarthropoda
  - †Diania
  - - †Lenisambulatrix
    - - - †Paucipodia
        - - †Thanahita
          - - †Eoconchariidae
              ⊞
              ⊟
              - †Microdictyon
              - †Fusuchoncharium
              - †Quadratapora
            - - - †Xenusion
                - †Onychodictyon
              - - †Strictocorniculum
                - †Rhombocorniculum
                - †Orstenotubulus
                - †Carbotubulus
                - †Hallucigenia fortis
                - †Hallucigenia sparsa
                - - †"Hallucigenia" hongmeia
                  - - †Cardiodictyon
                    - - Tardigrada (tardigrades)
                      - †Luolishaniida
                        ⊞
                        ⊟
                        - - †Ovatiovermis
                          - †Facivermis
                        - - †Luolishania
                          - †Collinsovermidae
                            - †EBS Collinsovermid (SAM P14848)
                            - - †Acinocricus
                              - - †Collinsovermis
                                - - †Collinsium
                                  - †Entothyreos
      - - †Aysheaiidae
        - Antennopoda
          - - †Antennacanthopodia
            - Onychophora (velvet worms)
          - - †Siberiidae
            - - - †Pambdelurion
                - †Kerygmachelidae
              - - †Opabiniidae
                - - †Radiodonta (e.g. Anomalocaris)
                  - Deuteropoda (modern arthropods)

== Evolutionary implications ==
Ignoring the tardigrades and velvet worms (which are sometimes excluded from the group), the overwhelming majority of lobopodians come from the Cambrian, with only a few persisting into the Ordovician, Silurian, and Carboniferous. At its time of discovery in 2012, the youngest known lobopodian was Orstenotubulus, an animal which only extended the group's range into the uppermost Middle Cambrian.

Hailing from the Carboniferous, Carbotubulus radically shifted the paradigm. It was a Lazarus taxon. There are other lineages that persisted for longer than originally thought, for example Mimetaster hexagonalis (a marrellomorph) and Schinderhannes bartelsi (a radiodont) from the Early Devonian. Still, the survival of Carbotubulus is much more extreme. Coincidentally, another lobopodian was recovered from the same fossil beds as Carbotubulus, Palaeocampa. This animal had been known for far longer than Carbotubulus, though its lobopodian affinity was only realized in 2025, being a late surviving member of Aysheaiidae. Though it shares the title of "youngest lobopodian", Carbotubulus is still the longest-lived member of Hallucigeniidae and significantly that family's length.
