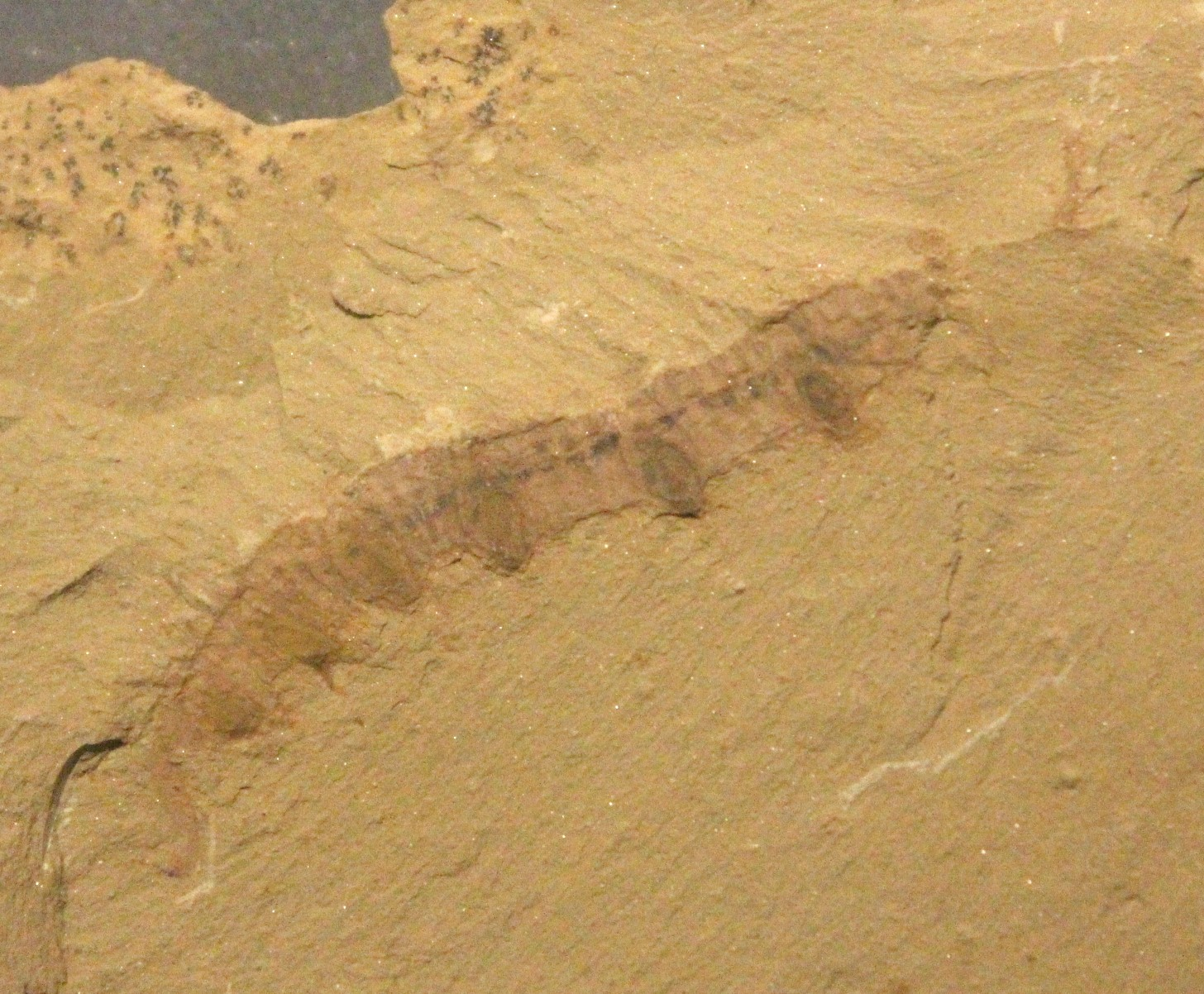
- O. ferox fossil, Geological Museum of China

Scientific classification
- Kingdom: Animalia
- Clade: Panarthropoda
- Phylum: †Lobopodia
- Class: †Xenusia
- Order: †Paronychophora
- Family: †Onychodictyidae
- Genus: †Onychodictyon; Hou, Ramsköld, & Bergström, 1991

Type species
- Onychodictyon ferox Hou, Ramsköld, & Bergström, 1991

Species
- O. ferox; O. spiniferum?

= Onychodictyon =

Onychodictyon Temporal range: Cambrian Stage 3

Extinct genus of lobopodians

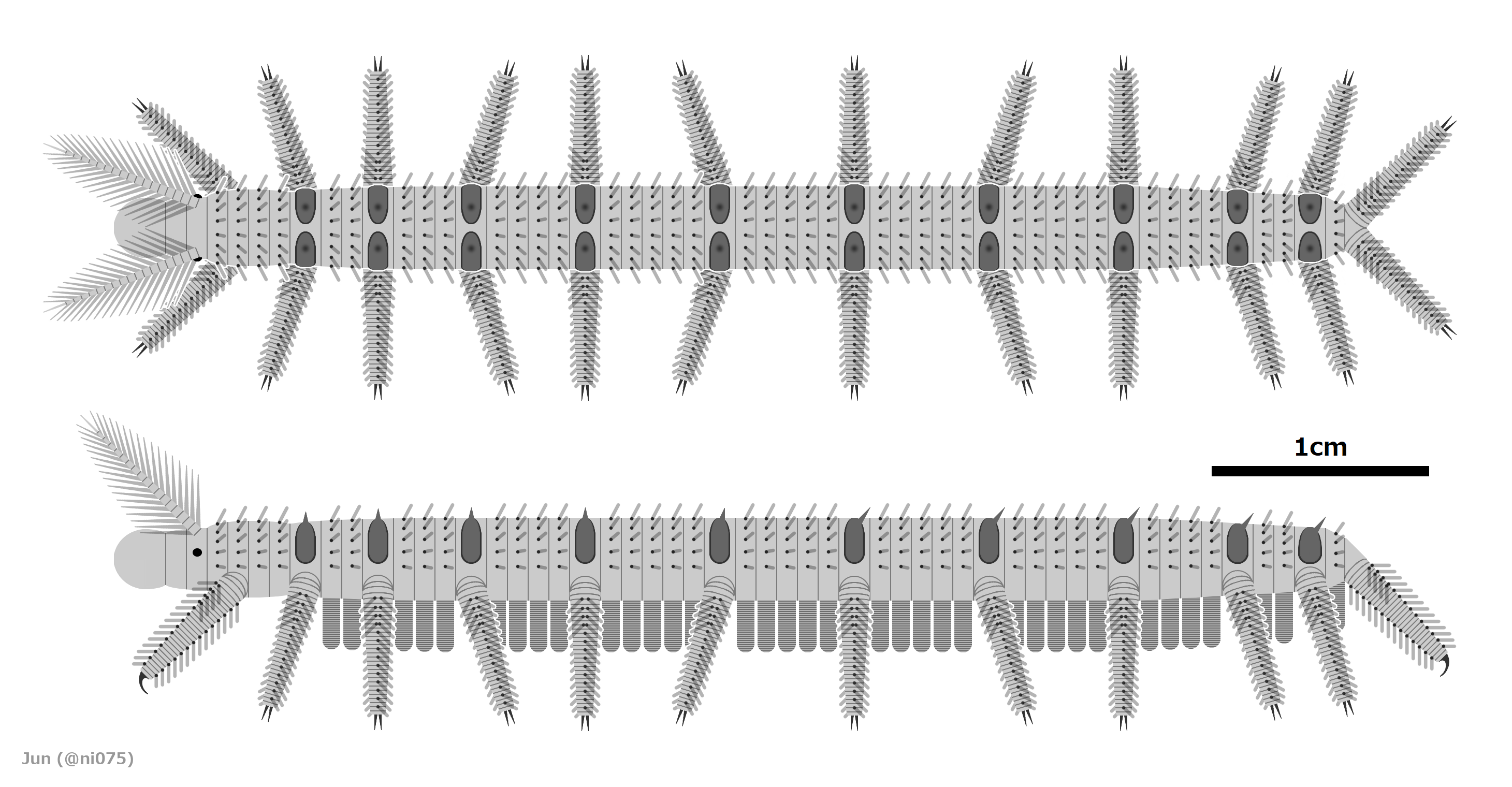
Restoration of Onychodictyon ferox

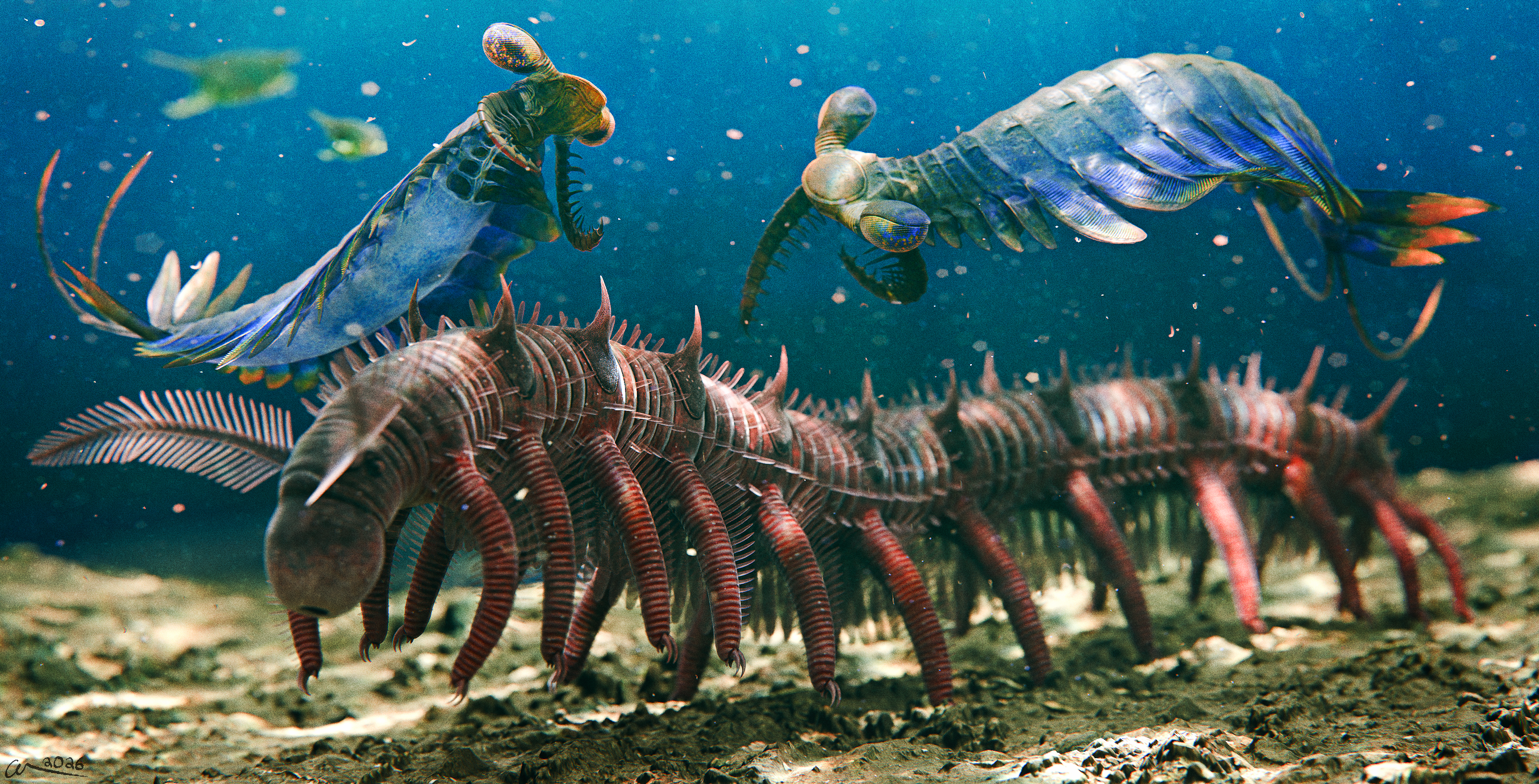
Life restoration of Onychodictyon (lower foreground) with stem arthropod Oreinorema

Onychodictyon is a genus of extinct lobopodian known from the Lower Cambrian Chengjiang Maotianshan Shales in the Yunnan Province in China. It was characterized by a stout body covered by fleshy papillae and pairs of sclerotized plates with spines, representing part of the diverse "armoured lobopodians" alongside similar forms such as Microdictyon and Hallucigenia.

== Discovery and naming ==
Onychodictyon is represented by two species: O. ferox from the Chengjiang Biota, and possibly O. spiniferum from Siberia (similar fossils known from Greenland are left in open taxonomy as Onychodictyon sp.), though some consider these synonymous. The species O. gracilis was erected in 2008 based on 3 specimens, which were later confirmed to belong to O. ferox.

== Description ==
The maximum length of Onychodictyon is 70 mm (2.8 in). It has a resemblance to Microdictyon (net-like sclerite ornament) but also Aysheaia and tardigrades (basally-fused terminal leg pairs). Each leg has a pair of curved claws that are thought to have aided Onychodictyon in climbing onto other organisms. By having a unique anterior end structure, Onychodictyon may have been a deposit feeder which means that they would scavenge for organic material from the seafloor. Onychodictyon sclerites appear to have molted with some specimens exhibiting perfectly conjoined plates from successive molts.

== Classification ==
The slightly simplified cladogram below is from a paper by Knecht et al. redescribing the lobopodian Palaeocampa anthrax.

- - †Diania
  - - †Lenisambulatrix
    - - - †Paucipodia
        - - †Thanahita
          - - †Eoconchariidae
              - †Microdictyon
              - †Fusuchoncharium
              - †Quadratapora
            - - - †Xenusion
                - †Onychodictyon
              - - †Strictocorniculum
                - †Rhombocorniculum
                - †Orstenotubulus
                - †Carbotubulus
                - †Hallucigenia fortis
                - †Hallucigenia sparsa
                - - †"Hallucigenia" hongmeia
                  - - †Cardiodictyon
                    - - Tardigrada (tardigrades)
                      - †Luolishaniida
                        - - †Ovatiovermis
                          - †Facivermis
                        - - †Luolishania
                          - †Collinsovermidae
                            - †EBS Collinsovermid (SAM P14848)
                            - - †Acinocricus
                              - - †Collinsovermis
                                - - †Collinsium
                                  - †Entothyreos
      - - †Aysheaiidae
          - †Aysheaia
          - - Soom Shale lobopodian (C1947)
            - - †Hadranax
              - †Palaeocampa
        - Antennopoda
          - - †Antennacanthopodia
            - Onychophora (velvet worms)
              - †Antennipatus
              - †Cretoperipatus
              - †Helenodora
              - Living onychophorans
          - - †Siberiidae
              - †Siberion
              - †Megadictyon
              - †Jianshanopodia
            - - - †Pambdelurion
                - †Kerygmachelidae
              - - †Opabiniidae
                - - †Radiodonta (e.g. Anomalocaris)
                  - Deuteropoda (modern arthropods)
