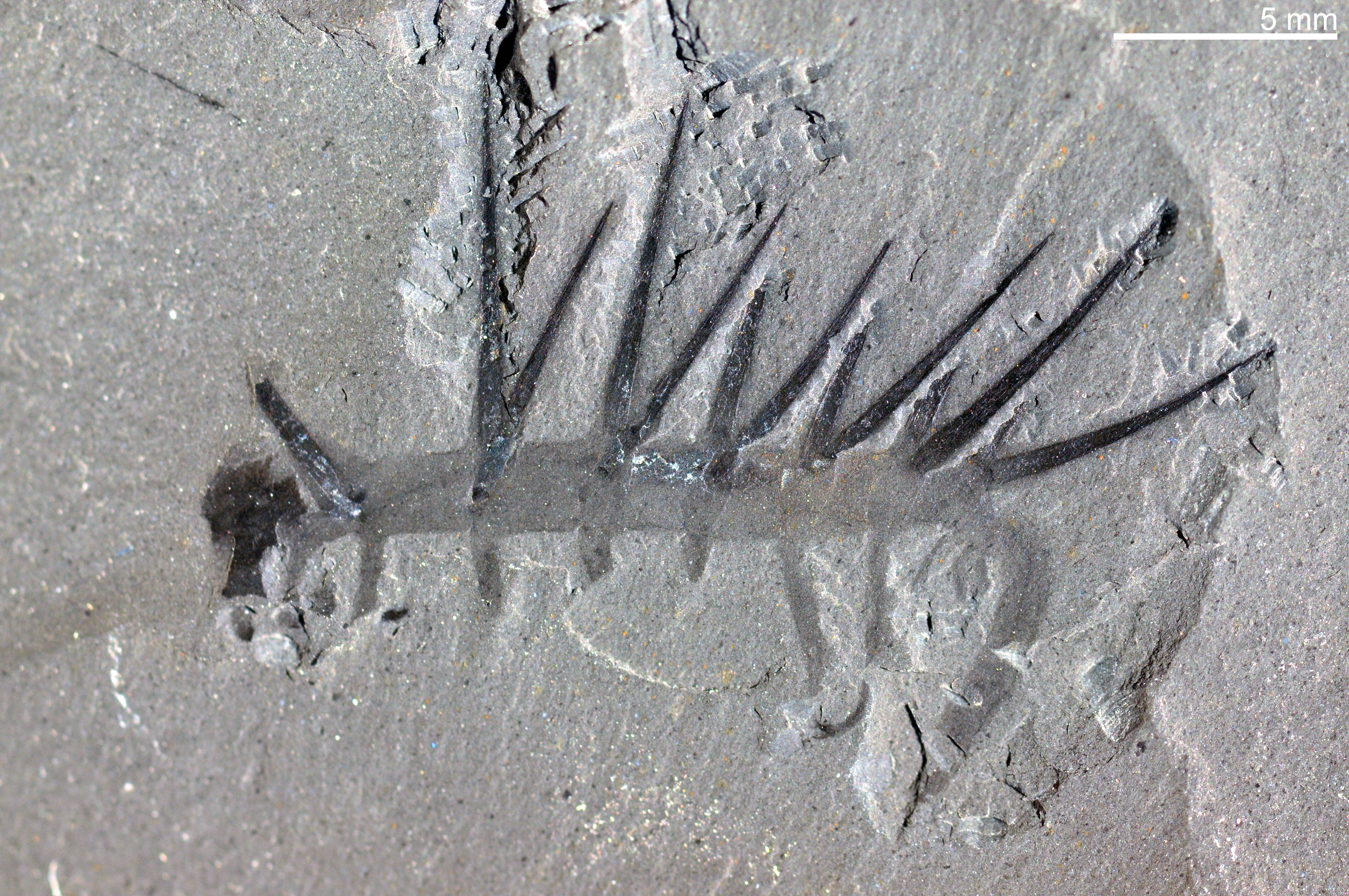
- Fossil of Hallucigenia from the Burgess Shale

Scientific classification
- Kingdom: Animalia
- Clade: Panarthropoda
- Phylum: †Lobopodia
- Clade: †Hallucishaniids
- Family: †Hallucigeniidae; Conway Morris, 1977

Genera
- Carbotubulus Haug et al., 2012; Hallucigenia Conway Morris, 1977 (type); Thanahita? Siveter et al., 2018; Strictocorniculum Landing, 1959; Rhombocorniculum Walliser et al., 1959

= Hallucigeniidae =

Hallucigeniidae Temporal range: Cambrian Stage 3–Moscovian

Extinct family of lobopodian worms

Hallucigeniidae is a family of extinct panarthropods belonging to the group Lobopodia that originated during the Cambrian explosion. It is based on the species Hallucigenia sparsa, the fossil of which was discovered by Charles Doolittle Walcott in 1911 from the Burgess Shale of British Columbia. The name Hallucigenia was created by Simon Conway Morris in 1977, from which the family was erected after discoveries of other hallucigeniid worms from other parts of the world. Classification of these lobopods and their relatives are still controversial, and the family consists of at least four genera.

== History of discovery ==
The first fossil of hallucigeniid worm was discovered by an American palaeontologist Charles Doolittle Walcott from the Walcott Quarry that contains the Cambrian Burgess Shale. In 1911, Walcott gave the name Canadia sparsa as he believed that it was related to the polychaete worm (Annelida) Canadia spinosa, which he described simultaneously. British palaeontologist Simon Conway Morris re-examined the specimen and concluded that it was not a Canadia species. He created a new genus Hallucigenia in 1977. With only a single species and fragmentary fossils available, the relationship of the worm with other animals was not obvious. The most prominent feature of the worm, its body projections were particularly difficult to understand as there were two distinct groups, the tube-like tentacles and thornlike spines. Morris described the spines as the legs and the tentacles as feeding apparatus. Two other species were later discovered from the Cambrian Maotianshan shales of China, H. fortis in 1995, and H. hongmeia in 2012.

In 1991, Lars Ramsköld (Uppsala University, Sweden) and Hou Xian-guang (Nanjing Institute of Geology and Palaeontology, Chinese Academy of Sciences) described a new specimen, Microdictyon, from the lower Cambrian Maotianshan shales. With this relatively complete fossil, they assigned the animal to and reinterpreted Hallucigenia as a lobopodian, a legged worm-like taxon which were still thought to be exclusively related to onychophoran (velvet worm) at that time. They were also able to work out that by inverting the specimen upside down, the so-called tentacles were actually walking legs (called lobopods) and the spines were protective armours on the back. The reinterpretation was strengthened by the discovery of new species Cardiodictyon catenulum from the same Maotianshan shales, reported by Hou, Ramsköld and Jan Bergström in the same year.

In 2012, a different lobopodian fossil was discovered from the Carboniferous (about 305 million years old) sediments of the Mazon Creek in Illinois, US. Joachim T. Haug, Georg Mayer, Carolin Haug, Derek E.G. Briggs gave the name Carbotubulus waloszeki. In 2018, Thanahita distos was described by Derek J. Siveter, Briggs, David J. Siveter, Mark D. Sutton and David Legg from the Coalbrookdale Formation (Herefordshire Lagerstätte) at the England–Wales border in UK. Dated to about 430 million years old, it is the only known extinct lobopodian in Europe and the first Silurian lobopod known worldwide.

== Description ==
Hallucigeniid worms are elongated, soft-bodied animals characterised by several pairs of stumpy legs known as lobopods, for which they are included in the larger but informal group of animals, Lobopodia. Their body can be described in three parts: the head, neck, and the trunk. The head bears a pair of eyes. The neck can be prominent in some species such as T. distos in which it bears two pairs of small legs. The trunk is the longest part of the body and contains several pairs of legs on the frontal (ventral) side and several pairs of spines on the back (dorsal) side. Each legs has terminal claws. C. catenulum, measuring 2.5 cm long, bears about 25 pairs of legs.

T. distos, though incomplete, is the longest with 3 cm body length and bears at least nine pairs of legs. Hallucigenia species are highly diverse in body sizes, H. fortis is only about 1 cm long, H. hongmeia is intermediate with about 3 cm in length, and H. sparsa being the longest measuring 5.5 cm.
