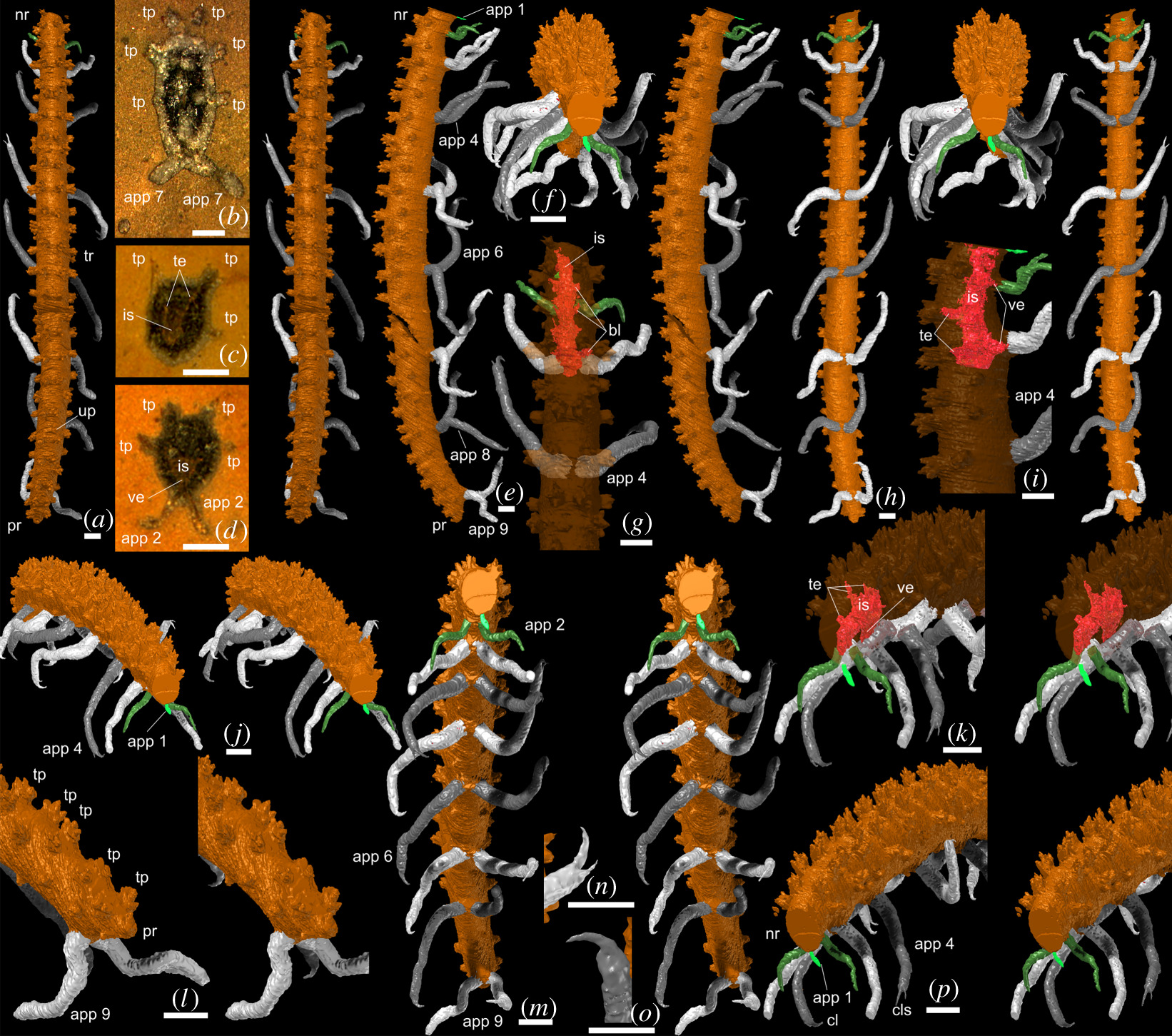
- Thanahita distos virtual reconstructions (a, e–p) and specimen in the rock (b–d)
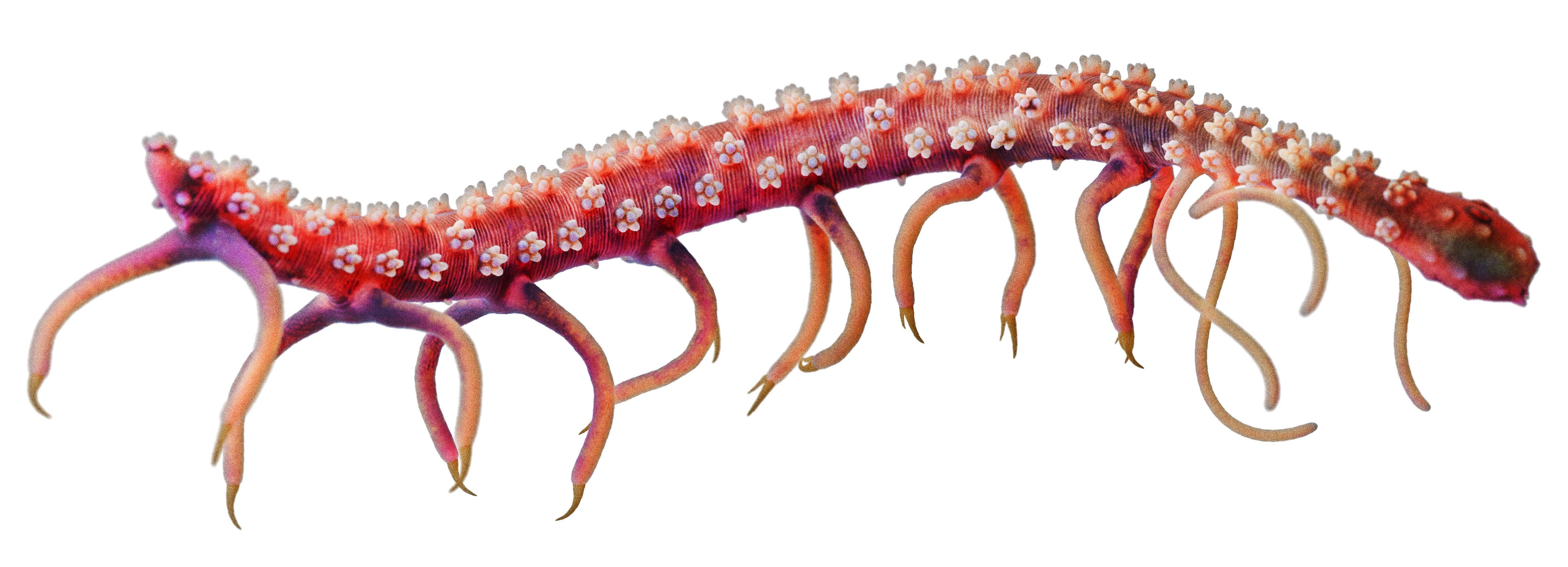
- Reconstruction of Thanahita distos

Scientific classification
- Kingdom: Animalia
- Clade: Panarthropoda
- Phylum: †Lobopodia
- Clade: †Hallucishaniids
- Family: †Hallucigeniidae
- Genus: †Thanahita; Siveter et al., 2018
- Species: †T. distos

Binomial name
- †Thanahita distos Siveter et al., 2018

= Thanahita =

Thanahita Temporal range: Silurian, Wenlock (Homerian), 430 Ma

Extinct genus of Lobopodian

Thanahita is a genus of extinct lobopodian and known from the middle Silurian Herefordshire Lagerstätte at the England–Wales border in the United Kingdom. It is monotypic and contains one species, Thanahita distos. Discovered in 2018, it is estimated to have lived around 430 million years ago and is the first Silurian lobopodian known worldwide.

== Discovery and naming ==
Thanahita was discovered in 2018 during a palaeontological expedition funded by the Natural Environment Research Council (NERC) and the Leverhulme Trust. The team of researchers comprised Derek J. Siveter (University of Oxford), Derek E. G. Briggs (Yale University), David J. Siveter (University of Leicester), Mark D. Sutton (Imperial College London) and David Legg (University of Manchester). The fossil was discovered from the Herefordshire Lagerstätte, which has been known to be a rich source of fossils of diverse animals. The only fossil of Thanahita (designated OUMNH C.29699) was collected from the upper part of Wenlock Series of the Lagerstätte.

The scientific genus name is derived from the Greek word, Theia, meaning goddess, and Anahita, an ancient Indo-Iranian deity of 'the Waters' (in Persian); while the specific name comes from the Greek distolos, meaning in pairs, plus acherdos, meaning a hedge shrub, alluding to the bilateral tufted papillae on the trunk.

== Description ==
Thanahita is an animal with elongated worm-like body and at least 9 pairs of stumpy legs called lobopods. The only available fossil is not complete and the entire structure is not known. However, it is preserved in a three-dimenstional structure from which the remaining body parts could be nicely examined. The body has three main parts: the head, neck and trunk. The head appears to be oval shaped, but much of it is missing. With the missing head part, the entire body length is 3 cm and about 2 mm wide. The neck has at least 2 pairs of tentacle-like legs that are smaller than the legs at the trunk. There are 7 pairs of legs on the trunk. Each leg bears one or two claws; leg number 4 and 5 having two claws, while leg 6 to 9 have one claw each. All the legs are arranged with a space of about 0.8 mm in between.

Semicircular papillae or sclerites are present on is back throughout most of its body length. These papillae are not uniformly present in each transverse line of the body, and are in pairs in some part but singly in the posterior region. The papillae bear tufts on their surfaces. The tufts are arranged in a grid, four columns wide, with about four rows of tufts per leg segment from the neck to the posterior end.

== Classification ==
Thanahita possess some shared features (e.g. anterior pairs of slender legs; reduced tail) with Cardiodictyon, Carbotubulus, and Hallucigenia, which have been classified within a single lobopodian family Hallucigeniidae. Thus, Thanahita also belongs to the same family, with Thanahita being a basal member or Hallucigenia as its closest relative. Since it is younger than other hallucigeniids, it is likely one of the last member of the family before the evolution of velvet worms (onychophorans), an extant panarthropod phylum which may or may not closely related to hallucigeniids.

The slightly simplified cladogram below is from a 2025 paper by Knecht et al. redescribing the lobopodian Palaeocampa anthrax. Rather than a Hallucigeniid, this study found Thanahita to be a basal lobopodian.

- - †Diania
  - - †Lenisambulatrix
    - - - †Paucipodia
        - - †Thanahita
          - - †Eoconchariidae
              - †Microdictyon
              - †Fusuchoncharium
              - †Quadratapora
            - - - †Xenusion
                - †Onychodictyon
              - - †Strictocorniculum
                - †Rhombocorniculum
                - †Orstenotubulus
                - †Carbotubulus
                - †Hallucigenia fortis
                - †Hallucigenia sparsa
                - - †"Hallucigenia" hongmeia
                  - - †Cardiodictyon
                    - - Tardigrada (tardigrades)
                      - †Luolishaniida
                        - - †Ovatiovermis
                          - †Facivermis
                        - - †Luolishania
                          - †Collinsovermidae
                            - †EBS Collinsovermid (SAM P14848)
                            - - †Acinocricus
                              - - †Collinsovermis
                                - - †Collinsium
                                  - †Entothyreos
      - - †Aysheaiidae
          - †Aysheaia
          - - Soom Shale lobopodian (C1947)
            - - †Hadranax
              - †Palaeocampa
        - Antennopoda
          - - †Antennacanthopodia
            - Onychophora (velvet worms)
              - †Antennipatus
              - †Cretoperipatus
              - †Helenodora
              - Living onychophorans
          - - †Siberiidae
              - †Siberion
              - †Megadictyon
              - †Jianshanopodia
            - - - †Pambdelurion
                - †Kerygmachelidae
              - - †Opabiniidae
                - - †Radiodonta (e.g. Anomalocaris)
                  - Deuteropoda (modern arthropods)
