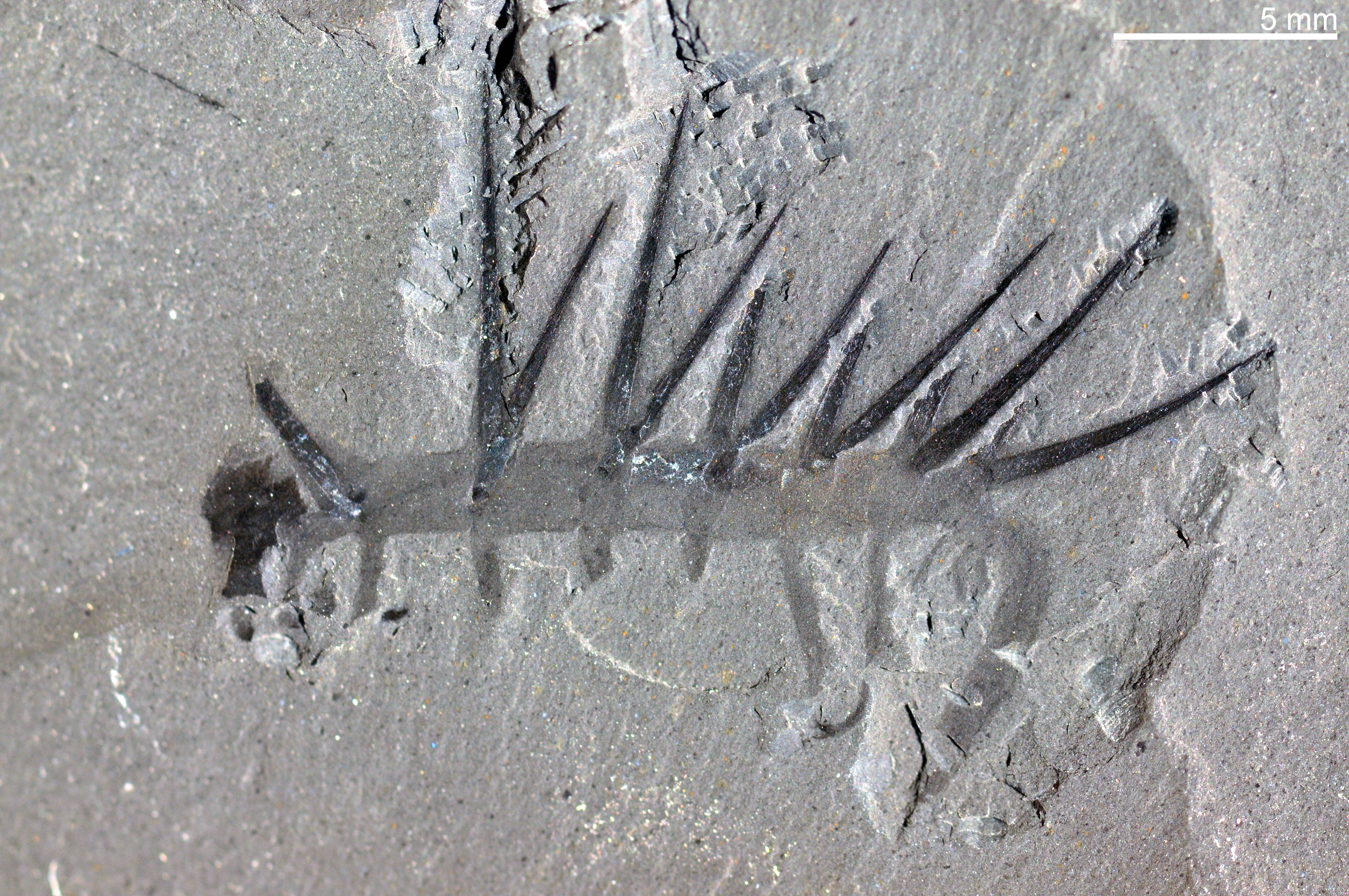
- Fossil holotype of Hallucigenia sparsa from the Burgess Shale

Scientific classification
- Kingdom: Animalia
- Clade: Panarthropoda
- Phylum: †Lobopodia
- Clade: †Hallucishaniids
- Family: †Hallucigeniidae
- Genus: †Hallucigenia; Conway Morris, 1977

Species
- H. sparsa (Walcott, 1911) (type); H. fortis Hou & Bergström, 1995; H. hongmeia Steiner et al 2012

Synonyms
- Canadia sparsa

= Hallucigenia =

Hallucigenia Temporal range: Cambrian Stage 3–Middle Cambrian

Genus of Cambrian animals

Hallucigenia is a genus of lobopodian known from Cambrian-aged fossils in Burgess Shale-type deposits in Canada (Burgess Shale) and China, and from isolated spines around the world. The generic name reflects the type species' unusual appearance and eccentric history of study; when it was erected as a genus, H. sparsa was reconstructed as an enigmatic animal upside down and back to front. Lobopodians are a grade of Paleozoic panarthropods from which the velvet worms, water bears, and arthropods arose.

== History of discovery and naming ==
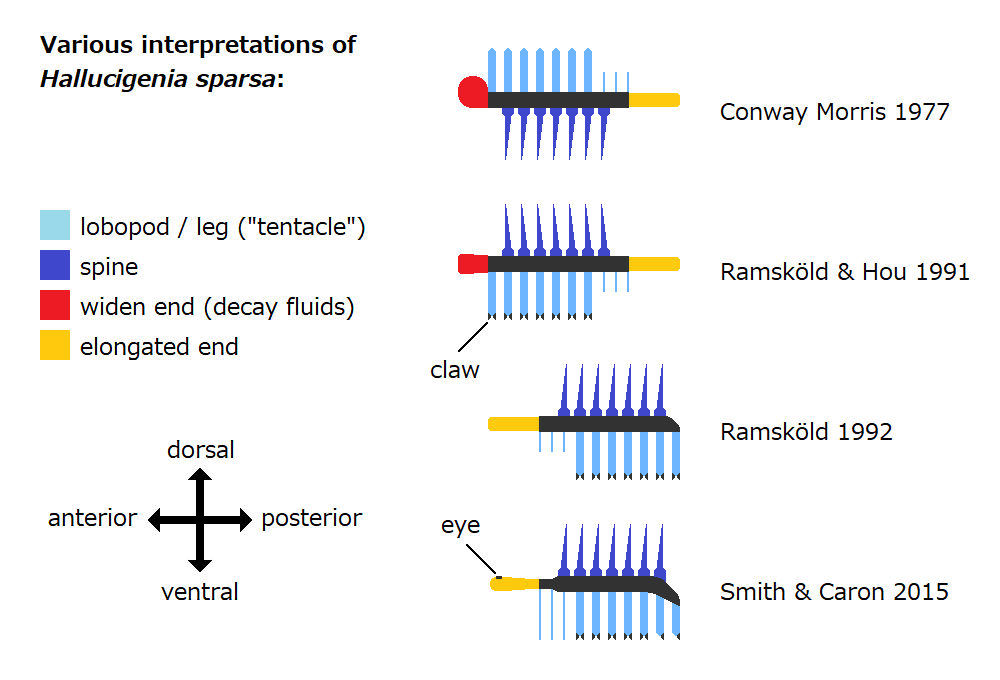
Various interpretations of Hallucigenia sparsa throughout the history of study

Hallucigenia sparsa was originally described by Charles Walcott as a species of the polychaete worm Canadia. In his 1977 redescription of the organism, Simon Conway Morris recognized the animal as something quite distinct, for which he proposed the name Hallucigenia because of the "bizarre and dream-like appearance of the animal." No specimen was available that showed both rows of legs, so Conway Morris reconstructed the animal walking on its spines, with its single row of legs interpreted as tentacles on the animal's back. A dark stain at one end of the animal was interpreted as a featureless head. Only the forward tentacles could easily reach to the "head", meaning that a mouth on the head would have to be fed by passing food along the line of tentacles. Conway Morris suggested that a hollow tube within each of the tentacles might be a mouth. This raised questions, such as how it would walk on the stiff legs, but it was accepted (with reservations) as the best available interpretation.

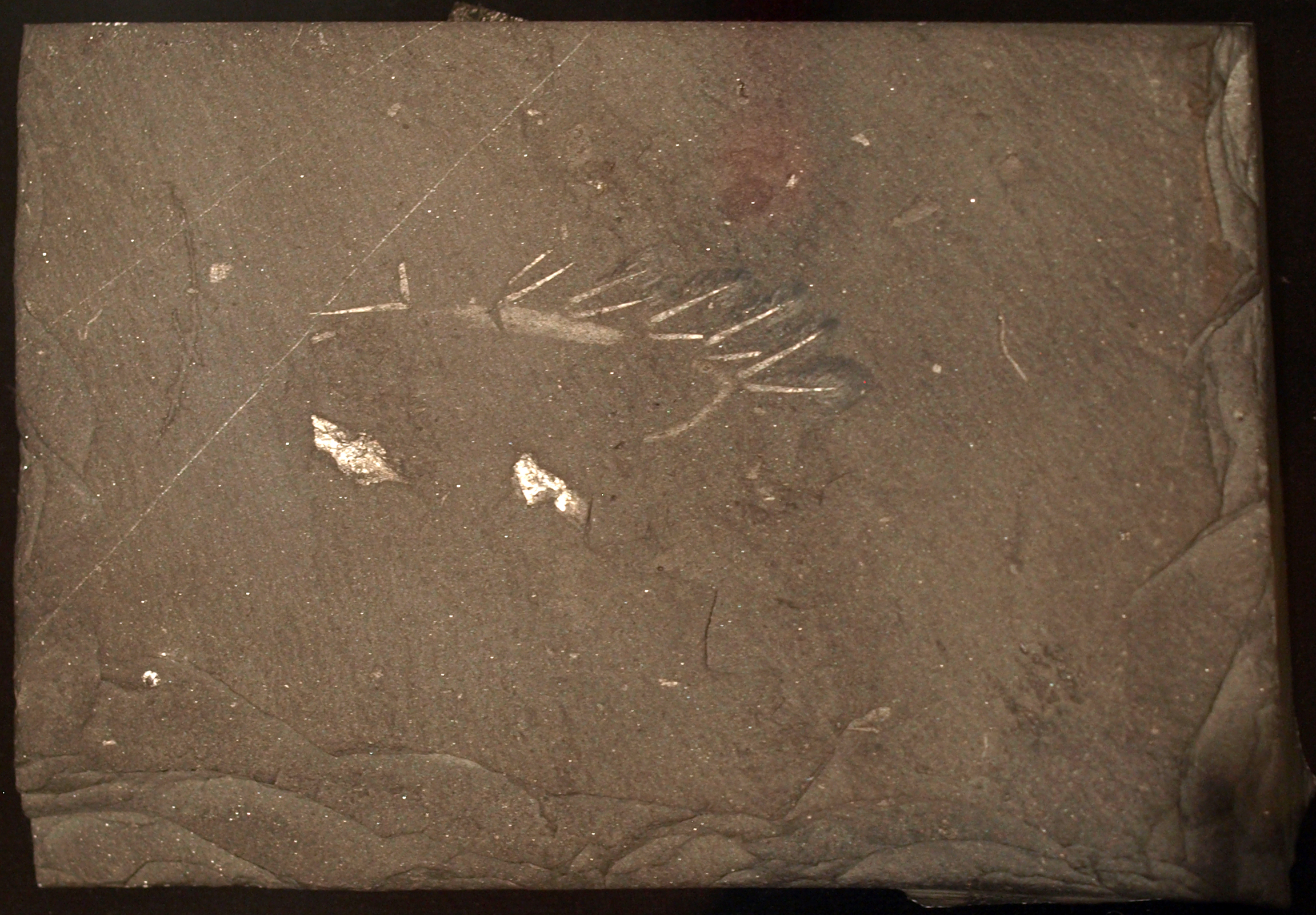
Specimen with obvious spines

An alternative interpretation considered Hallucigenia to be an appendage of a larger, unknown animal. There had been precedent for this, as Anomalocaris had been originally identified as three separate creatures before being identified as a single huge (for its time) 34.1-centimetre (1.12 ft) to 37.8-centimetre-long (1.24 ft) creature.

In 1991, Lars Ramskold and Hou Xianguang, working with additional specimens of a "hallucigenid", Microdictyon, from the lower Cambrian Maotianshan shales of China, reinterpreted Hallucigenia as a lobopodian, a legged worm-like taxon which at that time were still thought to be exclusively related to onychophoran (velvet worm), carnivorous animals that resemble a caterpillar and shoot a sticky substance from their papillae to ensnare their prey. They inverted it, interpreting the tentacles, which they believe to be paired, as walking structures and the spines as protective. Further preparation of fossil specimens showed that "second legs" were buried at an angle to the plane along which the rock had split, and could be revealed by removing the overlying sediment. Ramskold and Hou also believe that the blob-like "head" is actually a stain that appears in many specimens, not a preserved portion of the anatomy. This stain may be an artifact of decomposition.

Hallucigenia was first described from the Burgess Shale in southeastern British Columbia, Canada. 109 specimens of Hallucigenia are known from the Greater Phyllopod bed, where they comprise 0.3% of the community. Hallucigenia also forms a minor component of Chinese lagerstätten. Isolated hallucigeniid spines, however, are widely distributed in a range of Cambrian deposits, preserved both as carbonaceous and mineralized fossils.

Three species of Hallucigenia have been described. The first specimen, Hallucigenia sparsa, was discovered in Canada. Two other species, H. fortis and H. hongmeia, are represented by the Maotianshan Shales' fossils of Chengjiang.

== Description ==
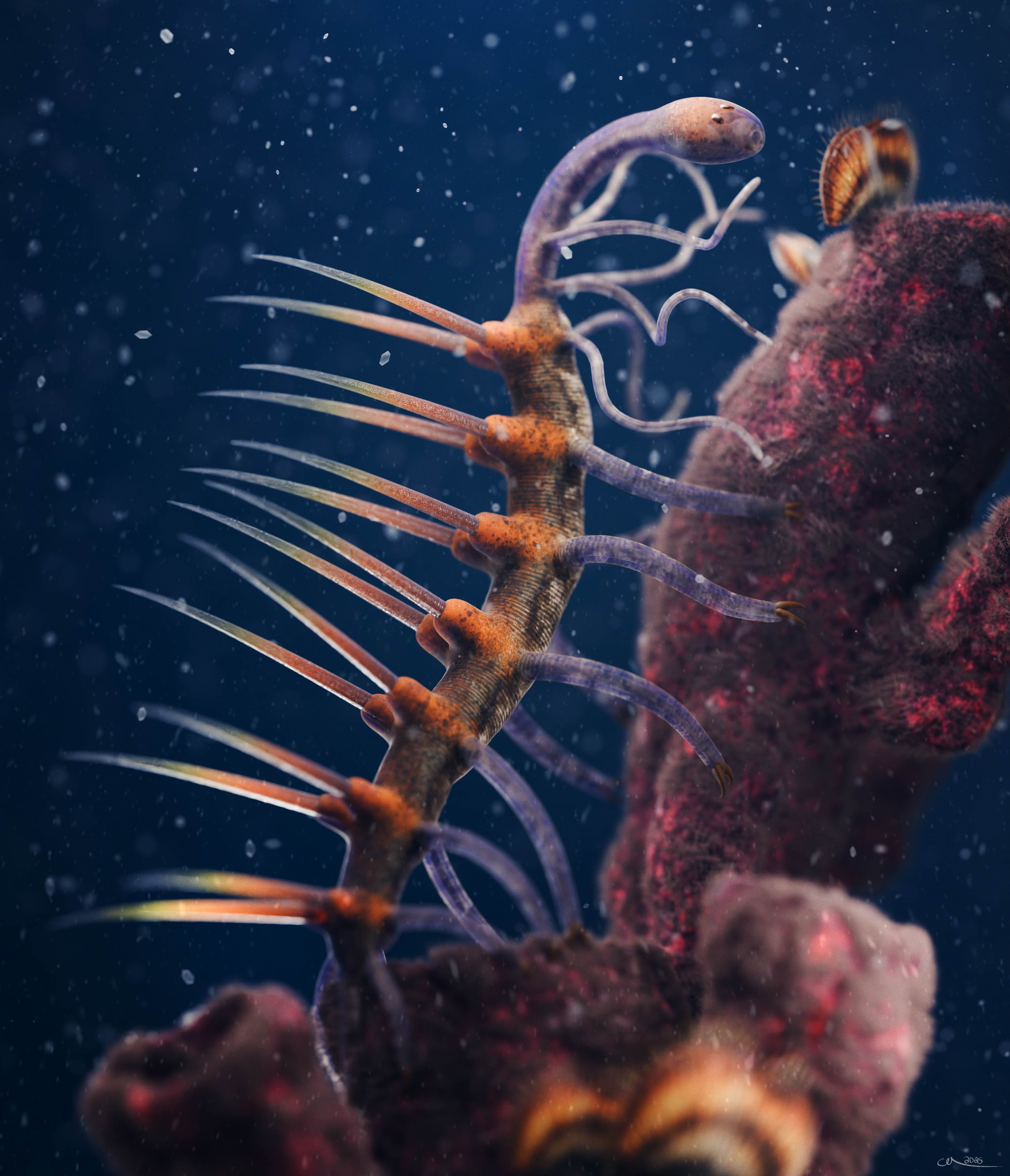
Restoration of H. sparsa

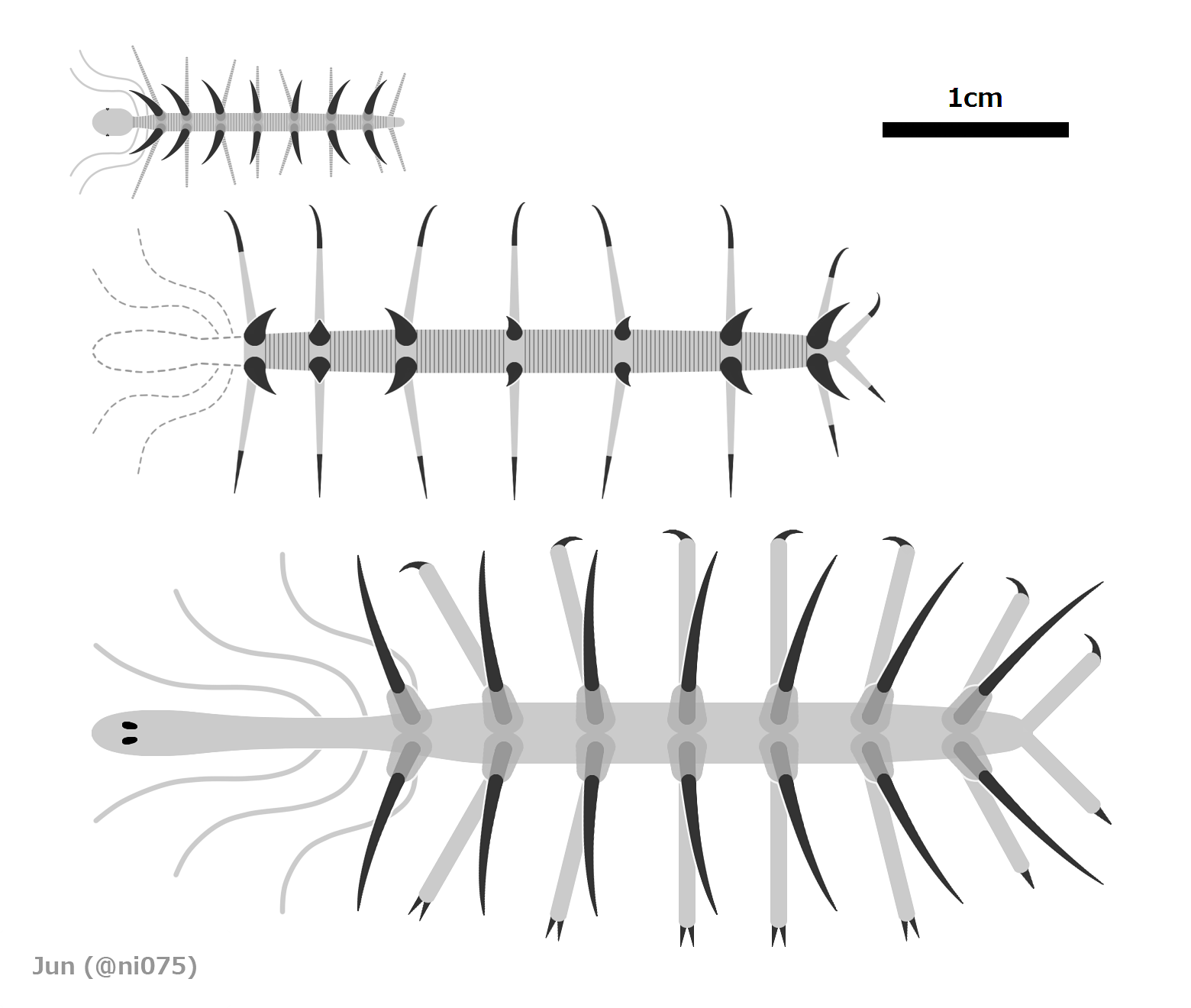
Reconstructions of H. fortis, H. hongmeia, and H. sparsa in scale.

Hallucigenia is a 0.5–5.5 cm (3/16–2 3/16 in) long tubular animal with up to ten pairs of slender legs (lobopods). The first 2 or 3 leg pairs are slender and featureless, while the remaining 7 or 8 pairs each terminate with 1 or 2 claws. Above the trunk region are 7 pairs of rigid conical sclerites (spines) corresponding to the 3rd–9th leg pairs. The trunk is either featureless (H. sparsa) or divided by heteronomous annulations (H. fortis and H. hongmeia). The "head" and "tail" end of the animal are difficult to identify; one end extends some distance beyond the legs and often droops down as if to reach the substrate. Some specimens display traces of a simple gut.

Research in the mid-2010s clarified that the longer end is a head with anteroventral mouth and at least a pair of simple eyes. The shape of head differs between species – elongated in H. sparsa, rounded in H. fortis, while those of H. hongmeia remain unknown. At least in H. sparsa, the head possesses radial teeth and pharyngeal teeth within the front of the gut.

Hallucigenia's spines are made up of one to four nested elements. The spine surface of H. sparsa is covered in an ornament of minute triangular "scales", while the spine surface of Hallucigenia hongmeia is a net-like texture of microscopic circular openings, which can be interpreted as the remains of Papillae.

In 2002, Desmond Collins informally suggested that new Hallucigenia fossils from the Burgess Shale showed male and female forms, one with "a rigid trunk, robust neck and a globular head" and the other thinner, and with a small head.

== Classification ==
External videos
- Hallucigenia: The worm with the missing head Nature Video, YouTube.

Since the revisions around 1990s, Hallucigenia is unquestionably a lobopodian panarthropod, although the relationship with other panarthropods remains controversial. Hallucigenia has long been interpreted as a stem-group onychophoran (velvet worms) – a position that has found support from multiple phylogenetic analysis. A key character demonstrating this affinity is the cone-in-cone construction of Hallucigenia claws, a feature shared only with modern onychophorans. On the other hand, some analysis rather support the position of Hallucigenia as a basal panarthropod outside of onychophoran stem-group. Under this scenario, the cone-in-cone structure shared between Hallucigenia and onychophorans represent panarthropod plesiomorphy. Hallucigenia also exhibits certain characters inherited from the ancestral ecdysozoan, but lost in the modern onychophorans – in particular its distinctive foregut armature. Other studies have suggested that hallucigeniids have closer affinities to the filter feeding "luolishaniid" lobopodians and to living tardigrades than to onychophorans.

Phylogeny of Panarthropoda and lobopodians after Knecht et al. 2025:

- †Diania
- - †Lenisambulatrix
  - - - †Paucipodia
      - - †Thanahita
        - - †Eoconchariidae
            - †Microdictyon
            - †Fusuchoncharium
            - †Quadratapora
          - - - †Xenusion
              - †Onychodictyon
            - - †Strictocorniculum
              - †Rhombocorniculum
              - †Orstenotubulus
              - †Carbotubulus
              - †Hallucigenia fortis
              - †Hallucigenia sparsa
              - - †Hallucigenia hongmeia
                - - †Cardiodictyon
                  - - Tardigrada
                    - †Luolishaniida
                      - - †Ovatiovermis
                        - †Facivermis
                      - - †Luolishania
                        - †Collinsovermidae
                          - †Acincocricus
                          - - †Collinsovermis
                            - - †Collinsium
                              - †Entothyreos
    - - †Aysheaiidae
        - †Aysheaia
        - - †Hadranax
          - †Palaeocampa
      - Antennopoda
        - - †Antennacanthopodia
          - Onychophora (velvet worms)
        - - †Siberiidae
            - †Siberion
            - †Megadictyon
            - †Jianshanopodia
          - - - †Pambdelurion
              - †Kerygmachelidae
            - - †Opabiniidae
              - - †Radiodonta (e.g. Anomalocaris)
                - Deuteropoda (modern arthropods)

== See also ==
- Paleobiota of the Burgess Shale
