= Fusuconcharium =

Fusuconcharium Temporal range: Cambrian Series 2

Scientific classification
- Kingdom: Animalia
- Clade: Panarthropoda
- Phylum: †Lobopodia
- Class: †Xenusia
- Order: †Archonychophora
- Family: †Eoconchariidae
- Genus: †Fusuconcharium
- Species: †F. typicum

Binomial name
- †Fusuconcharium typicum Hao and Shu, 1987

Synonyms
- F. minimum

Extinct genus of lobopodians

Fusuconcharium is a genus of lobopodian known only from its biomineralized dorsal plates, which somewhat resemble those of Microdictyon.
