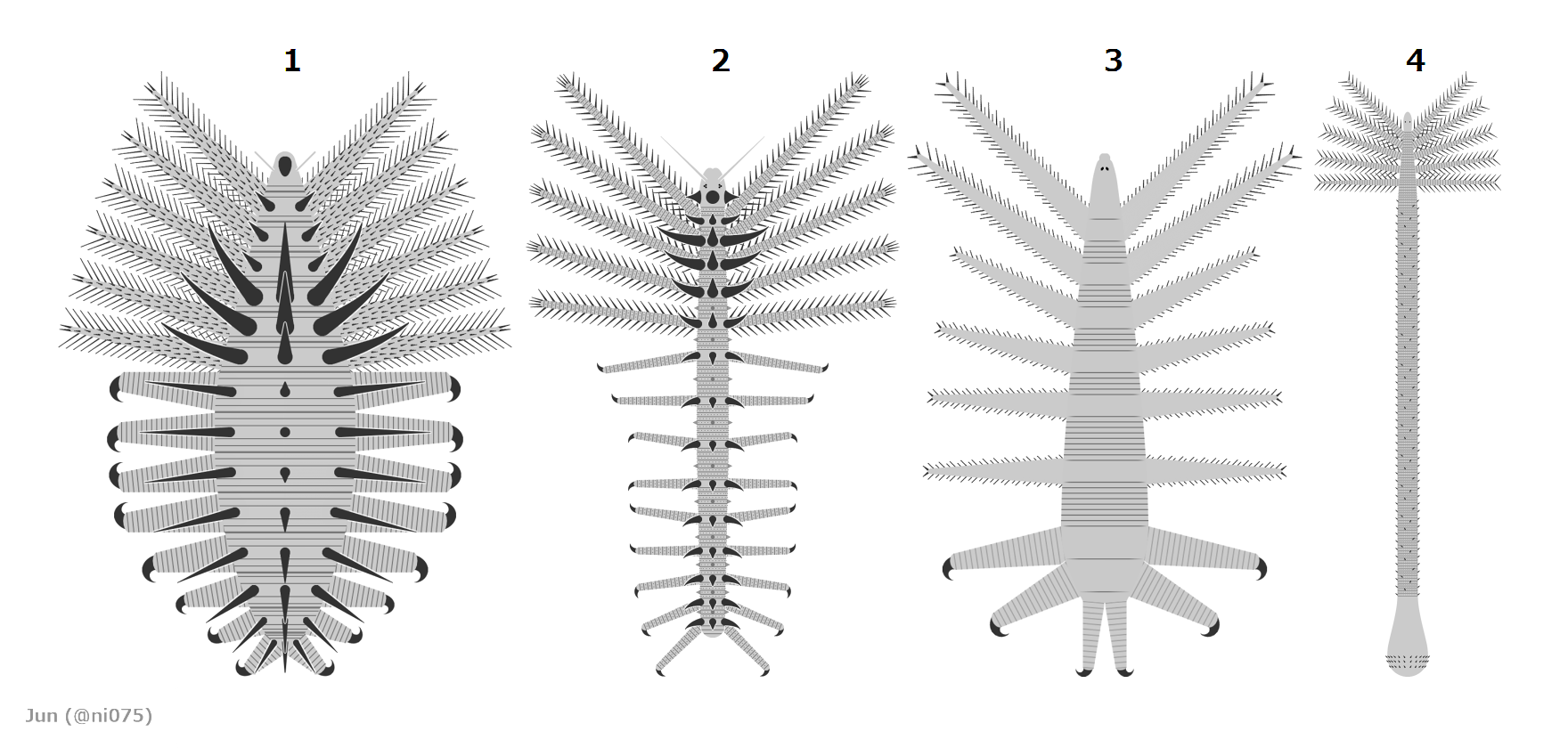
- Diagrammatic reconstructions of various luolishaniids

Scientific classification
- Kingdom: Animalia
- Clade: Panarthropoda
- Phylum: †Lobopodia
- Clade: †Hallucishaniids; Smith & Caron, 2015

Families
- †Hallucigeniidae; †Luolishaniidae; †Orstenotubulus (incertae sedis)

= Hallucishaniids =

Hallucishaniids Temporal range: Cambrian Stage 3–Moscovian Possibly ancestors of tardigrades.

Possibly extinct group of lobopodians

"Hallucishaniids" are a proposed clade of lobopodians uniting the families Hallucigeniidae and Luolishaniidae. The name of this clade is a portmanteau of its two constituent families.

== Morphology and description ==
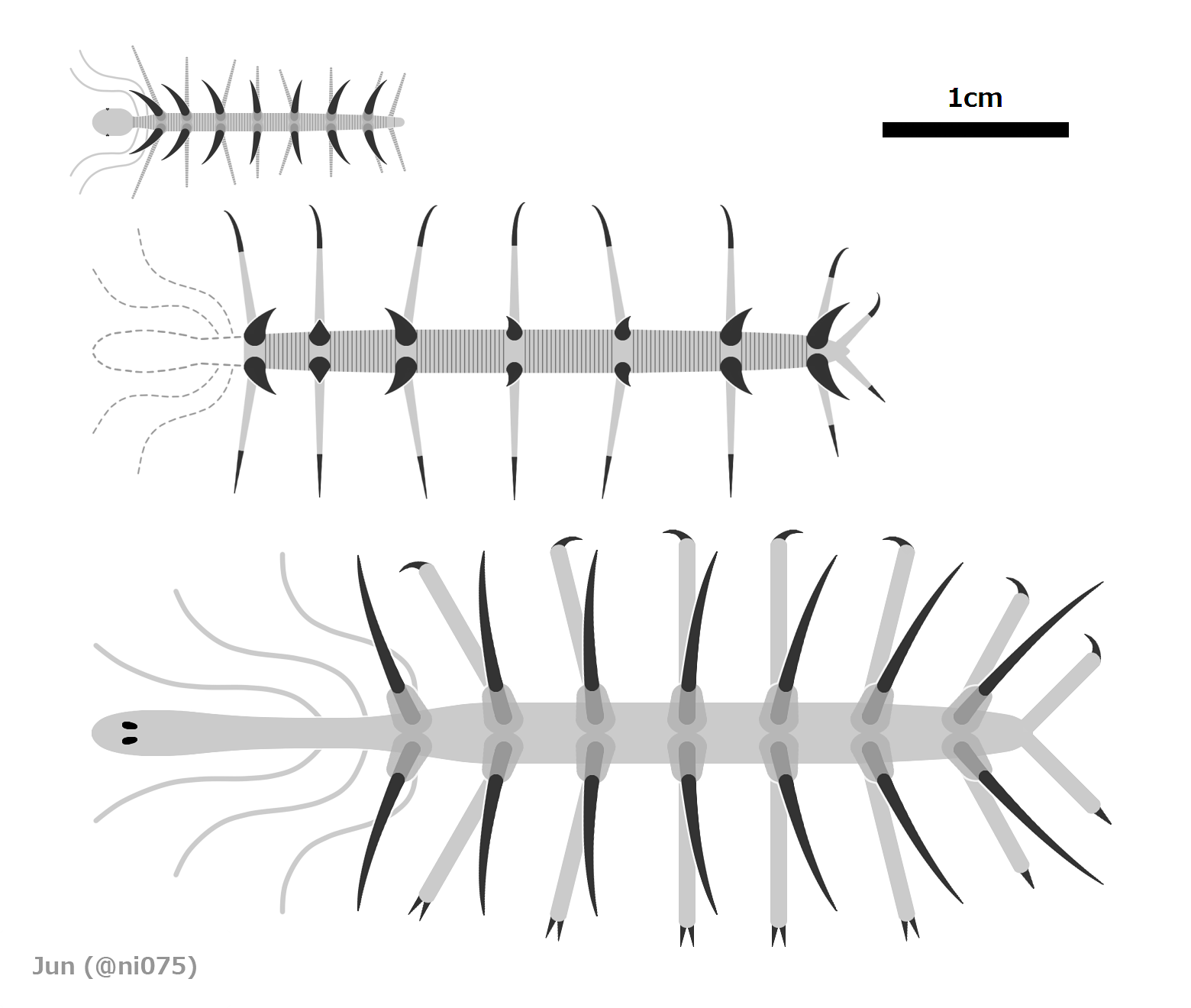
Diagrammatic reconstructions of various Hallucigenia species

Hallucishaniids have two or three body zones. The first of these contains the eyespot-bearing head and several pairs of feathery appendages likely specialised for filter feeding. The second, larger zone consists of many pairs of clawed limbs used for walking with each pair corresponding to a sclerite, with a third zone present in Ovatiovermis where the feathery appendages continue with far shorter branches, and clawed limbs are reduced to the last few pairs. The limb claws seem to alternate which direction they face. Most hallucishaniids have spine-like sclerites which vary in width and length, however some like Cardiodictyon have more plate-like sclerites, and Ovatiovermis as well as Facivermis lack them entirely. Thanahita is especially bizarre, as while it retains sclerites they are rather randomly distributed along the body and have several tufts near their tips which make them vaguely resemble coral polyps. The sclerites are paired in hallucigeniids, but luolishaniids have three or more per lobopod pair; some, such as Acinocricus and Collinsium, have rings of sclerites in between their lobopods. In addition, luolishaniids often have a circular, flat head sclerite.

Hallucishaniids have just one or two claws per limb, as opposed to the three or more of other lobopodians like Aysheaia. Luolishaniids in particular also have hardened sheets within their bodies, likely to support the larger, broader spines they often bear. This feature is particularly prominent in Entothyreos, which has large shield-like sheets alongside a partly arthrodised last pair of limbs. Arguably the most derived hallucishaniid of all is Facivermis, which entirely lacks limbs except for its filtering appendages, with a pear-shaped posterior body end, alongside seemingly living in tubes much like some modern polychaetes.

Hallucishaniids are among the longest-lasting lobopodians, with fossils extending from the Cambrian to the Carboniferous. The luolishaniids (and specifically Ovatiovermis) are also likely ancestral to tardigrades.
