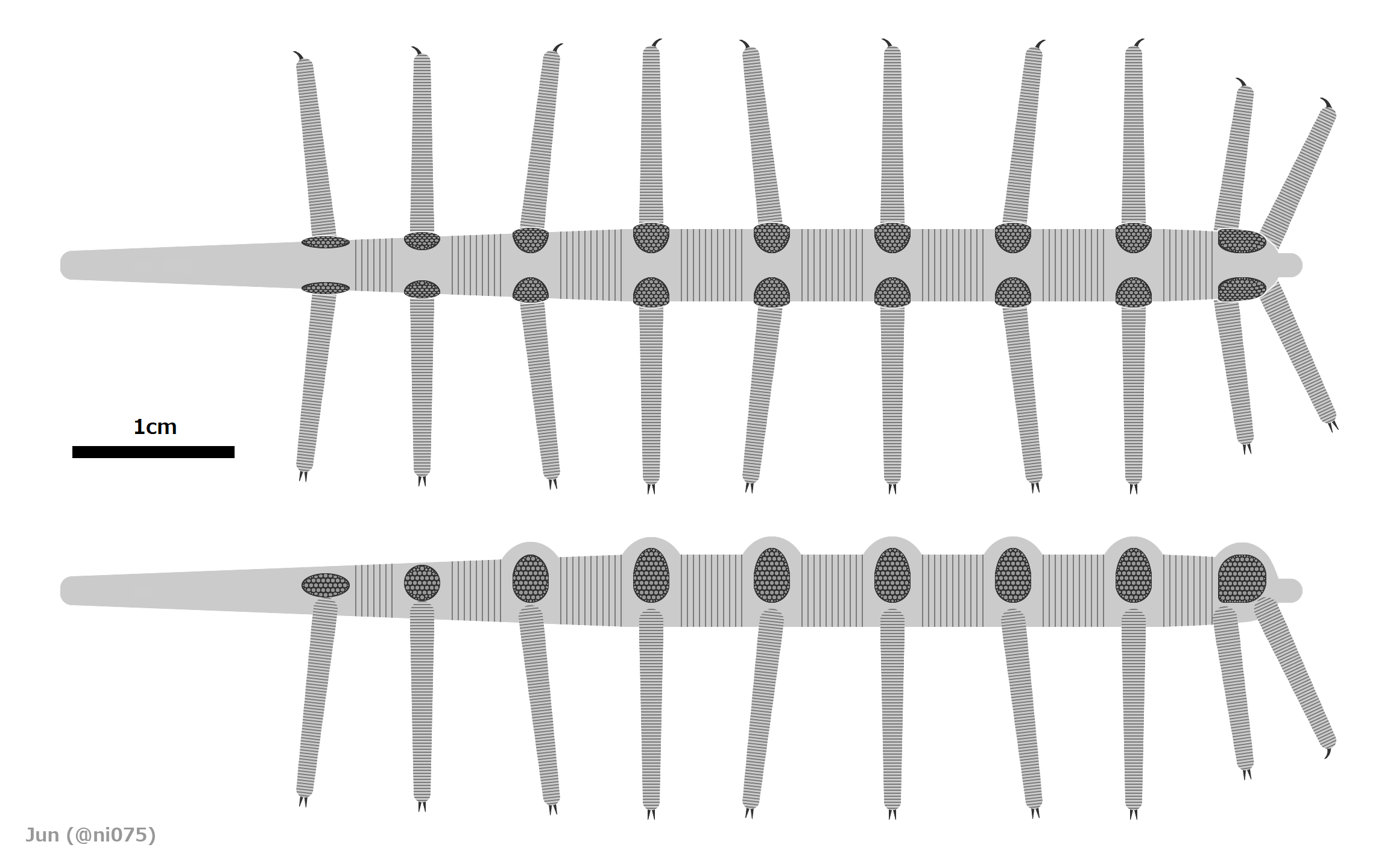
- Diagrammatic reconstruction of Microdictyon sinicum
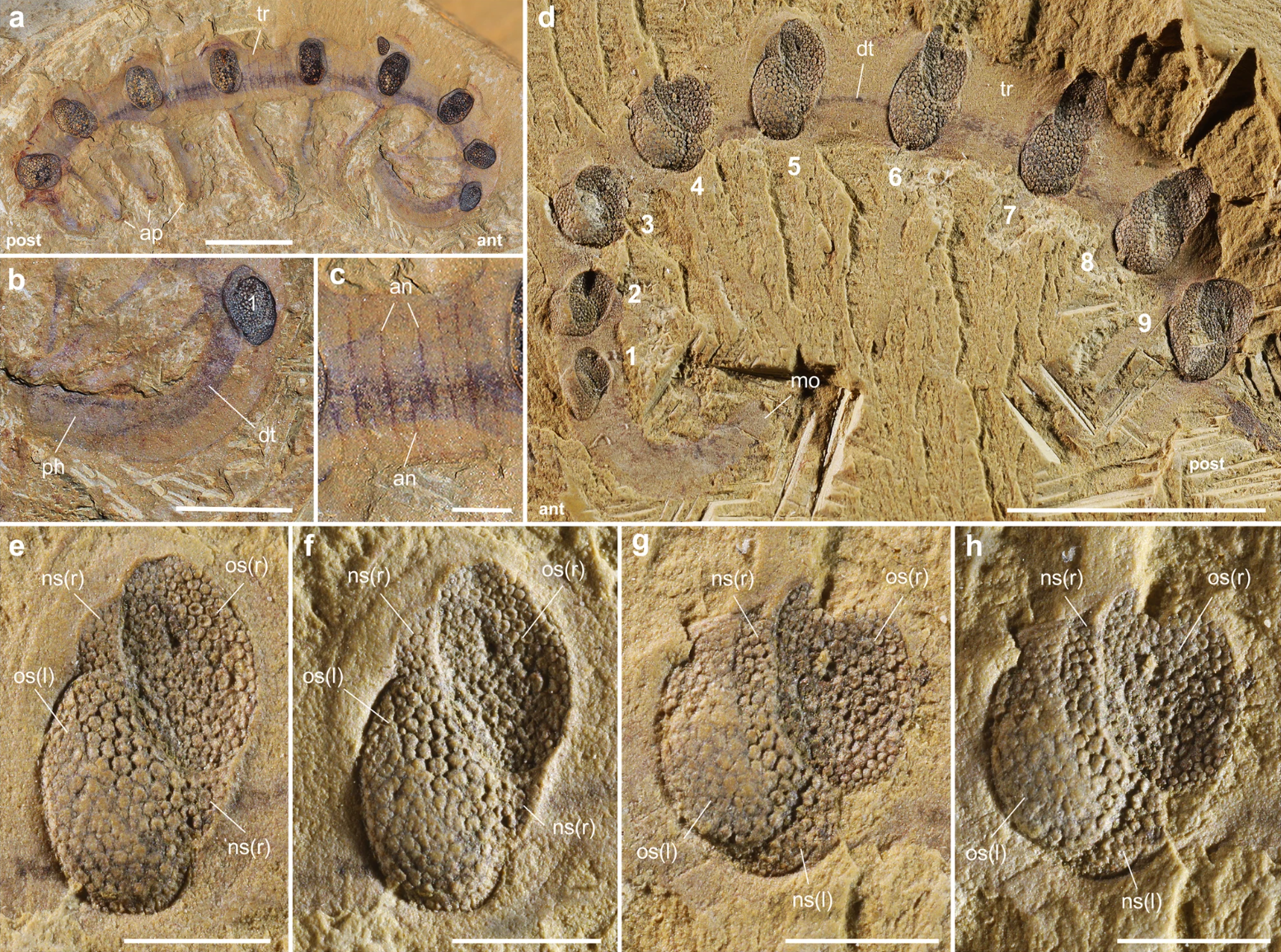
- Microdictyon sinicum fossil

Scientific classification
- Kingdom: Animalia
- Clade: Panarthropoda
- Phylum: †Lobopodia
- Class: †Xenusia
- Order: †Archonychophora
- Family: †Eoconchariidae
- Genus: †Microdictyon; Bengtson, Matthews & Missarzhevsky, 1986

Type species
- Microdictyon effusum Bengtson, Matthews & Missarzhevsky, 1986

Species
- See text

= Microdictyon =

Microdictyon Temporal range: Cambrian Stage 3–Middle Cambrian

Extinct genus of lobopodian worm

Microdictyon (Greek for 'small net') is an extinct genus of lobopodian worm characterized by its net-like sclerite armour plates, known from Cambrian deposits around the world. Soft-bodied fossils which preserve more than the sclerites are only known from the Chengjiang Lagerstätte of Yunnan, China.

== History ==
Microdictyon sclerite plates have been recovered from around the globe, recovered from rock via acid dissolution which eats away at the rock but leaves behind compositionally distinct microfossils. The first of them were found in the Strenuella Limestone of Comley, England, in 1975. The genus Microdictyon was erected by Stefan Bengston, Vladimir Missarzhevsky, and S. C. Matthews in 1981, as an enigmatic net-like microfossil, based on a few isolated plates from South Kazakhstan, although this description lacked a type species and proper description, so a following publication by the same authors in 1986 corrected this. It was unknown at the time what animal could have produced it - suggestions for its producer included echinoderms, sponges, and radiolarians. A number of Microdictyon species were named in the following years. The genus Eoconcharium was named in 1987 based on fossils from China, and a family was erected to contain it, the Eoconchariidae. Although it was later recognized as a junior synonym of the earlier named Microdictyon, the name of the family group Eoconchariidae, which today contains Microdictyon, Fusuconcharium, and Quadratapora, kept priority. The first complete specimens of Microdictyon were found in the Chengjiang Biota of Yunnan, China. The two soft bodied fossils, which showed the characteristic Microdictyon plates armouring the body of a caterpillar-like worm, were discovered in 1989 and given the name Microdictyon sinicum. A more complete description based on over 70 newly discovered fossils, also from Chengjiang, was published in 1995. Additional soft-bodied fossils of Microdictyon were reported from the Kaili Biota in 1999, which have not been assigned to a species.

== Description ==
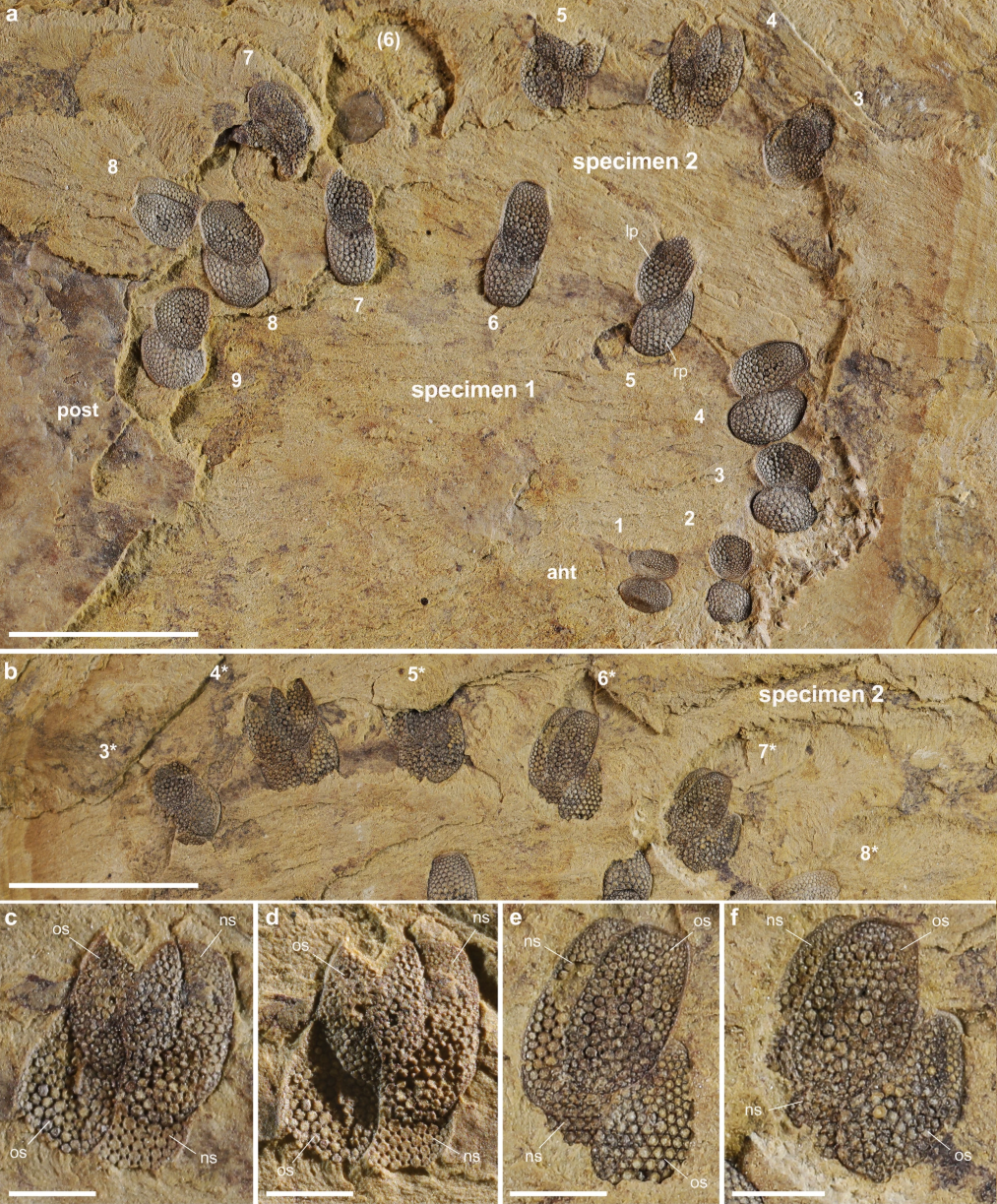
Moulting specimens of Microdictyon sinicum.

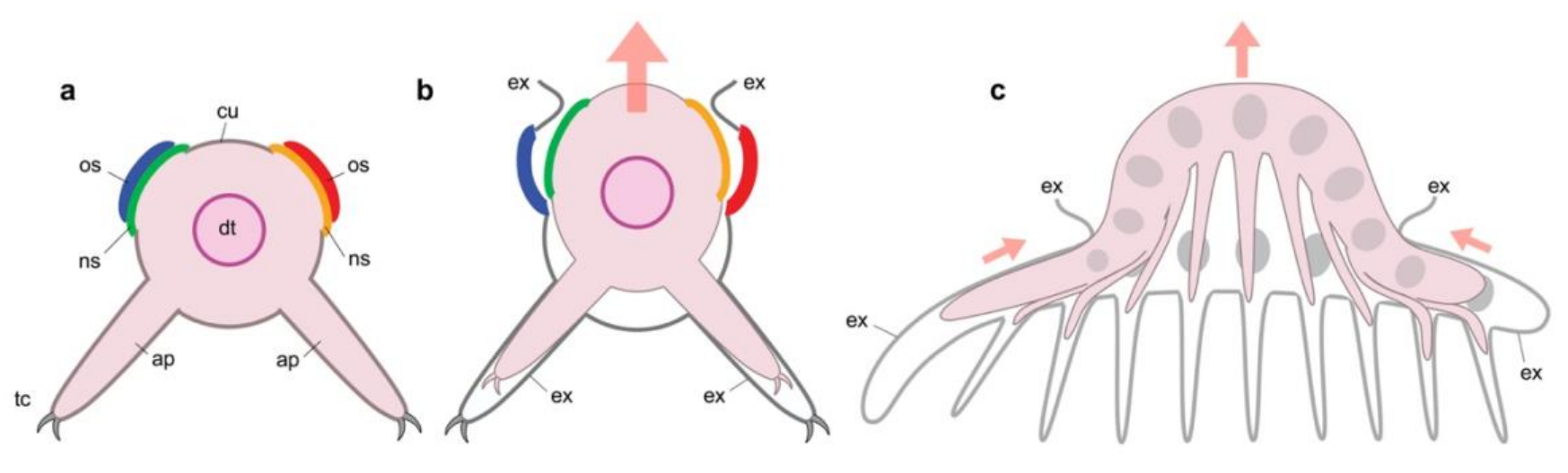
Assumed moulting process of Microdictyon

Excluding their sclerites, Microdictyon had a relatively simple, conserved body plan among lobopodians. Based on fossils of Microdictyon sinicum, the trunk was elongate, up to 77 millimetres (3.0 in) in length (although other species may have been smaller or larger), with 10 pairs of tube-like limbs and 9 pairs of netted sclerite plates. Each limb pair was associated with a single pair of plates, except for the posterior-most set of limbs which shared a sclerite pair with the penultimate leg pair. The legs are undifferentiated, tipped with a pair of small, curved claws. The legs were finely annulated, and ornamented further with small papillae. The trunk itself was also annulated and dotted with small papillae between the limb pairs. At each sclerite plate pair, the body swells slightly to accommodate it, starting at a negligible height and becoming larger posteriorly as the plates increase in diameter. These plate-bearing mounds, and the area where the limbs attach below them, are devoid of annulation. The sclerite plates are subcircular and convex outwardly. They are composed of a fine, roughly hexagonal mesh of rounded hollow pits and specialized nodes at the mesh intersections. The nodes vary in morphology between species, but are typically mushroom-shaped. The walls of the sclerite were thin, and the sclerotized bars between nodes may have further bumps on their surface, and the entire mesh is surrounded by a thin marginal rim. Rarely, the plates may develop large spines randomly on their surface. The head and neck were smooth or only finely annulated, with a small mouth set slightly ventrally at the anterior of the head. No evidence for eyes, cephalic appendages, or any structure resembling teeth or jaws has been reported. The gut was simple and straight, with the anus found at the end of a small posterior tail-like projection.

== Ecology ==
Microdictyon was epibenthic, walking along the seafloor using is lobopodous limbs. The anterior portion of the body was the most flexible - fossils showing Microdictyon strongly curled up indicate that the cause of death was anoxia, inferred from studies on modern arthropods and annelids. The claws of Microdictyon are not particularly suited for walking on muddy substrate, but rather for climbing or grabbing — it was once proposed that, based on frequent association with fossils of Eldonia, and a presumed pelagic lifestyle for the jellyfish-like Eldonia, that Microdictyon would use its claws to grab onto the large disc-shaped animal as it swam in order to feed on it. However, Eldonia is no longer thought to be pelagic, and probably lived gregariously on the seafloor. The frequent association with Microdictyon still likely indicates an ecological link, with Microdictyon possibly using its claws to feed on Eldonia or other carcasses — a similar relationship has been proposed for Paucipodia. Paucipodia and Microdictyon have also been found preserved alongside mass concentrations of living, dead, and decaying Cricocosmia worms.

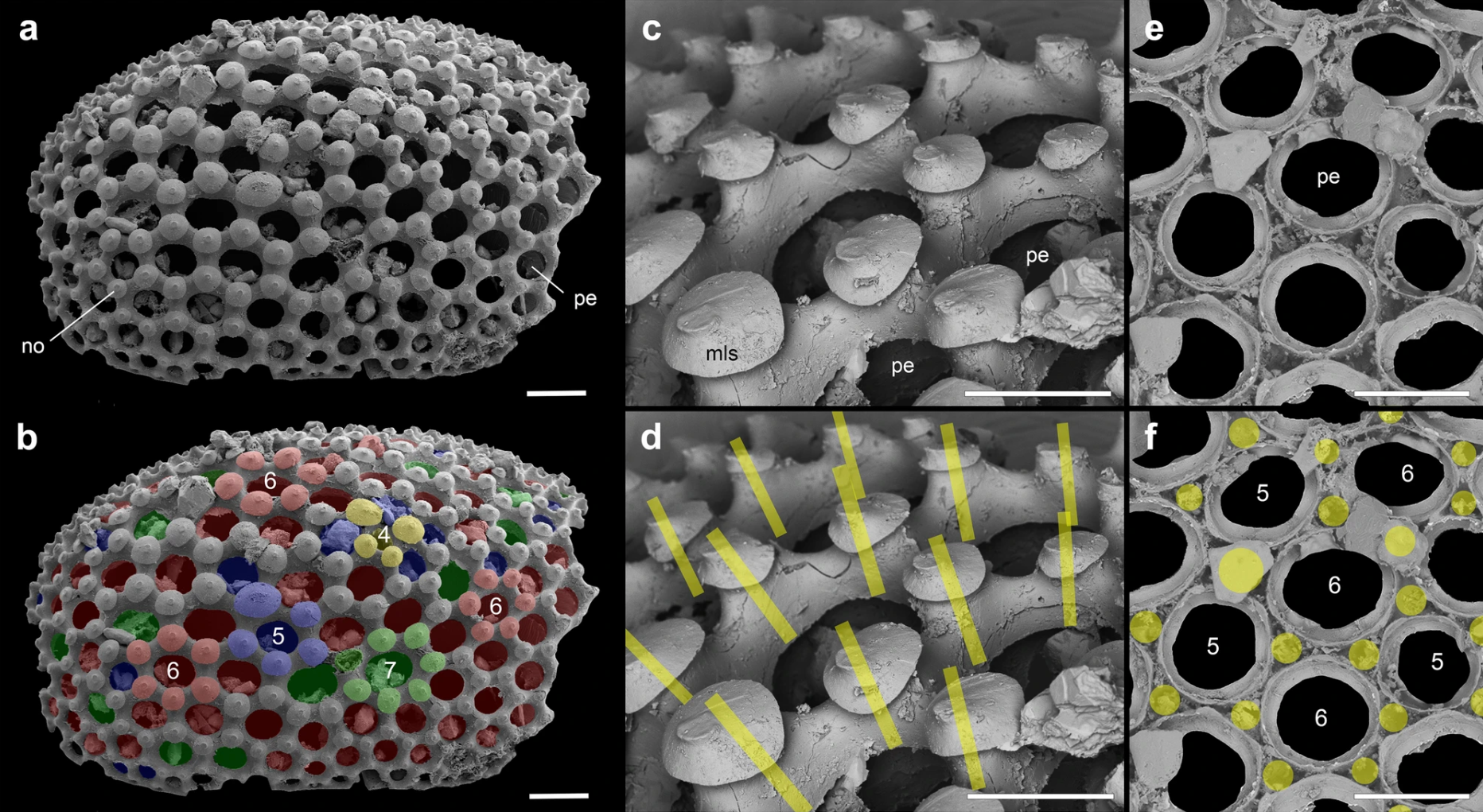
Microdictyon sclerite plates from the Cambrian Xinji Formation.

The purpose and development of Microdictyon's sclerotized plates remains a subject of debate. Some authors, beginning with Jerzy Dzik in 2003, propose that based on a similar proposed method of sclerite growth and a similar morphology, these sclerites could be interpreted as large compound eyes, similar to phacopid trilobites — this idea has been widely rejected. The other proposals, that being defense and or muscle attachment, are viewed as much more plausible. Evidence from a small number of specimens, including both complete fossils from the Chengjiang as well as isolated microfossil plates, indicate that Microdictyon and other eoconchariids moulted their plates asynchronously, with the new, larger plates forming beneath the old ones, starting with the plates in the middle of the body and spreading to the anterior and posterior plates later. The new plates were not formed all at once, and the old plates remained overtop of the new ones for some time before the moult was completed, with the old cuticle rupturing along the dorsal surface, and the animal emerging with already hardened plates. This is similar to the biphasic moulting of modern isopods (the posterior half of the body moults first, followed later by the anterior half), as opposed to most crustaceans, which moult their entire exoskeleton in a single step.

== Taxonomy ==
Except for Microdictyon sinicum from the Chengjiang Biota and Microdictyon sp. from the Kaili Biota, all Microdictyon species have been established on the basis of isolated sclerite plates. As of the publication of Topper et al. (2011), 9 species of Microdictyon were recognized as valid, and after Wotte and Sundberg (2017), 11 species, with a large number of specimens around the world still left in open nomenclature. Because the shape and outline of the plate varies down the length of the animal, and size will be determined by age, only node morphology and the arrangement of the holes is considered effective in determining species.

- Type species Microdictyon effusum Bengston, Matthew, and Missarzhevsky, 1981 (Cambrian Series 2, Stage 3) — Known from Kazakhstan, Russia, and Sweden, possibly South China and the UK.
  - †M. rhomboidale Bengston, Matthew, and Missarzhevsky, 1986 (Cambrian Series 2, Stage 3) — Known from Uzbekistan and Russia, possibly South China, Canada, and the USA.
  - †M. robisoni Bengston, Matthew, and Missarzhevsky, 1986 (Cambrian Series 3, Stage 5) — Known from Russia and the USA.
  - †M. chinense Hao and Shu, 1987 (Cambrian Series 2, Stage 3) — Known from South China.
  - †M. sphaeroides Hinz, 1987 (Cambrian Series 2, Stage 3 to Cambrian Series 3, Stage 5) — Known from Russia and the UK.
  - †M. sinicum Chen, Hou, and Lu, 1989 (Cambrian Series 2, Stage 3) — Known from South China (Chengjiang Biota).
  - †M. depressum Bengston et al., 1990 (Cambrian Series 2, Stage 3 to Cambrian Series 2, Stage 4) — Known from Australia, possibly Greenland.
  - †M. fuchengense Li and Zhu, 2001 (Cambrian Series 2, Stage 3) — Known from South China.
  - †M. jinshaense Zhang and Aldridge, 2007 (Cambrian Series 2, Stage 3) — Known from South China.
  - †M. montezumaensis Wotte and Sundberg, 2017 (Cambrian Series 2, Stage 3) — Known from the USA.
  - †M. cuneum Wotte and Sundberg, 2017 (Cambrian Series 2, Stage 3) — Known from the USA.

Additional, unnamed species are also known from North China, Mongolia, Turkey, and Mexico.
